= Waves (airline) =

Regional airline of Guernsey

IATA	ICAO	Call sign
–	–	–
- Founded: 2016
- Commenced operations: 11 October 2017
- Ceased operations: June 2018
- Operating bases: Guernsey Airport
- Fleet size: 1
- Destinations: 3
- Headquarters: Guernsey, Channel Islands
- Key people: Nick Magliocchetti (founder)
- Website: flywaves.gg

Waves was a small airline based in Guernsey in the Channel Islands and a subsidiary of Waves Technologies Ltd., a privately owned company. It planned to operate from Guernsey Airport to up to 15 regional airports in and around the Channel Islands. Waves also planned to undertake cargo and medevac activities, on demand.

== History ==
Waves was founded by Nick Magliocchetti in 2016 to establish an on-demand service in-line with similar private-hire taxi services as well as timetabled services.

On 22 September 2017, Waves received its air operator certificate (AOC) from 2-REG, the civil aviation authority of Guernsey. Commercial but unscheduled service between Guernsey and Jersey began on 11 October 2017 and by 9 November, the airline had operated 100 flights. Waves made its first flight into Alderney on 14 November, and promised commercial service from the island, beginning later in 2017. Flights to the UK were planned to start in 2018, as well as regular services to regional French airports.

Due a lawsuit by competitor Blue Islands against the States of Guernsey's Transport Licensing Authority (TLA), Waves was forced in January 2018 to temporarily change its business model, to have customers hire the entire aircraft, instead of booking individual seats. In March 2018, the TLA issued Waves with route licences for Jersey and Alderney, allowing it to sell individual seats once again.

In June 2018 the company announced it was suspending all flights due to a maintenance issue but it was understandable that there were financial problems. The tiny airline was subsequently placed into liquidation in September 2018.

== Destinations ==
Waves served the following destinations:

France

- Brest - Charter
- Cherbourg – Maupertus Airport - Charter
- Caen – Carpiquet Airport - Charter
- Dinard - Charter
- Granville-Michel - Charter
- Lannion - Charter
- Nantes - Charter
- Rennes - Charter
- Saint-Brieuc - Charter

Channel Islands

- Guernsey Airport - Base
- Jersey Airport
- Alderney Airport

== Fleet ==
Waves operated one Cessna 208B Grand Caravan on a dry lease.
