= 2007 Alderney UFO sighting =

Reported UFO sighting

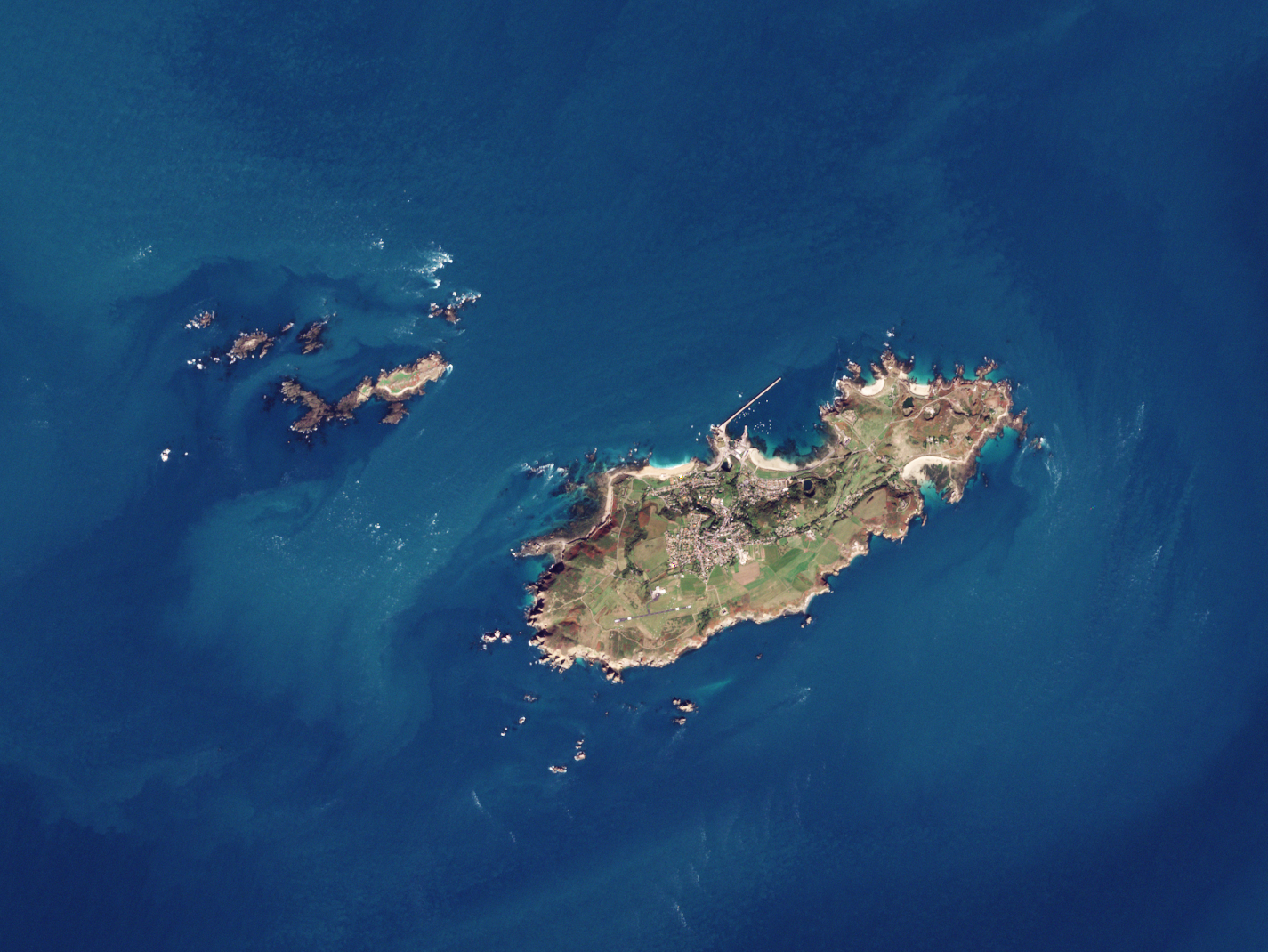
- The island of Alderney, above which the reported sighting took place.
- Date: 23 April 2007
- Time: Approximately 14:09 (UTC+0)
- Duration: Approximately 0:09:00
- Location: Over Alderney, Channel Islands; 49°42′N 02°22′W
- Type: UFO sighting
- First reporter: Ray Bowyer
- Participants: Ray Bowyer (pilot); Paul Kelly (air traffic controller); John and Kate Russell (passengers); Patrick Patterson (Blue Islands pilot)

In the afternoon of 23 April 2007, Ray Bowyer, a pilot for the airline Aurigny flying south towards the island of Alderney in the Channel Islands, sighted unidentified flying objects. He reported the sighting to an air traffic controller, who told him that a second pilot had seen something similar. In Bowyer's report to the British Civil Aviation Authority, he said he saw two bright, stationary objects. Two passengers on Bowyer's aircraft said that they saw unusual, coloured lights at the same time. Proposed explanations for the sighting have included earthquake lights and sun dogs.

== Accounts of the sighting ==
=== Bowyer's accounts ===
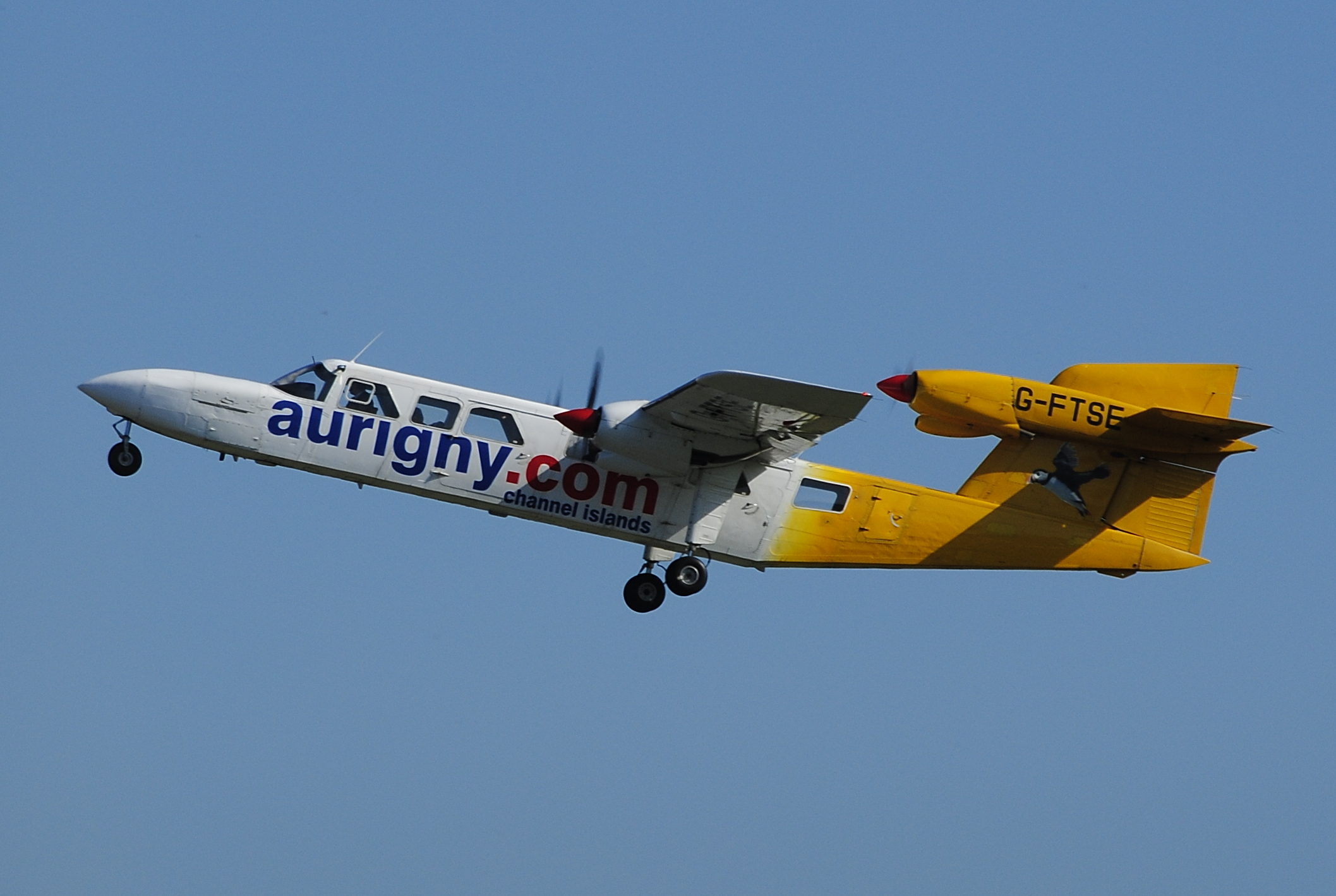
An Aurigny Trislander, similar to that flown by Bowyer

On 23 April 2007, Ray Bowyer, a fifty-year-old pilot for Aurigny with eighteen years of flying experience, reported seeing "a cigar-shaped brilliant white light" in the sky. He first thought that it was reflected light from greenhouses on the nearby island of Guernsey. Then he decided it was a stationary object, approximately the size of a Boeing 737, at an altitude of around 2,000 feet (610 m) and at a distance of 10 miles (16 km). He later concluded that its distance was closer to 40 miles (64 km) and its size was "as much as a mile wide". In 2021, Bowyer said it was "the size of five or six battleships", and that it had been "a very sharply defined, solid, bright yellow-gold object with a couple of black bands on the side that were kind of shimmering". For a 2007 BBC article two months after the incident, Boyer said it was "like a CD on its edge".

In 2013, the British academic and folklorist David Clarke published a partial transcript of the recorded conversation between Bowyer and an air traffic controller on the island of Jersey. In the transcript, the air traffic controller said that he did not pick up any radar contacts ahead of Bowyer's aircraft, only seeing "a very faint primary contact", which he considered to be meteorological in origin.

Bowyer said that he approached the light and looked at it through his binoculars. He later said that he had been "able to look at this fantastic light without discomfort". He also said he saw a second object moving in formation with the first set of lights, later stating it was "exactly the same ... [but] further away", being closer to the island of Guernsey. He said the UFO was "clearly visual" for approximately nine minutes.

After landing in Alderney, Bowyer made an official report to the Civil Aviation Authority, labelling the incident as a "near-miss". Bowyer then flew the return leg of his flight to Southampton, but did not see the objects again. By 25 April 2007, the British Ministry of Defence (MoD) had stated that it would not investigate the reported sighting. Approximately a week after the reported sighting, the MoD stated the incident had taken place in French airspace and so was outside its responsibility. Two weeks after that, the MoD released information connected with the report, including a statement from a second pilot. The report of the sighting published by the MoD reads in its entirety:

First object was bright orange/yellow. There was a gap in light or darker area. Second object was identical.

Later, in Pilot magazine, Bowyer added a sketch of what he had seen to this report, in which he described the objects as approximately the size of a "reasonably large town". Bowyer reported to the BBC that he was "pretty shook-up" by what he saw, describing the incident as "pretty scary". The Times regarded Bowyer's report as "one of the most impressive and perplexing testimonies to have found its way into MoD archives". In 2008, the British newspaper The Daily Telegraph reported on the incident in connection with what it called a "huge rise" in reported UFO sightings in the United Kingdom.

=== Other witness accounts ===
According to Bowyer, several passengers on his aircraft had noticed the light, one of whom described it as "sunlight-coloured". Two passengers reported seeing the light to the Evening Standard, one of them describing it as "an orange light ... like an elongated oval". Patrick Patterson, a pilot from the airline Blue Islands reported that he saw a similarly described object in the same approximate position. It was later reported that this pilot saw "an object behind him to his left" at 1,950 feet (590 m). One interpretation of this event was that this was an atmospheric phenomenon.

== Proposed explanations ==
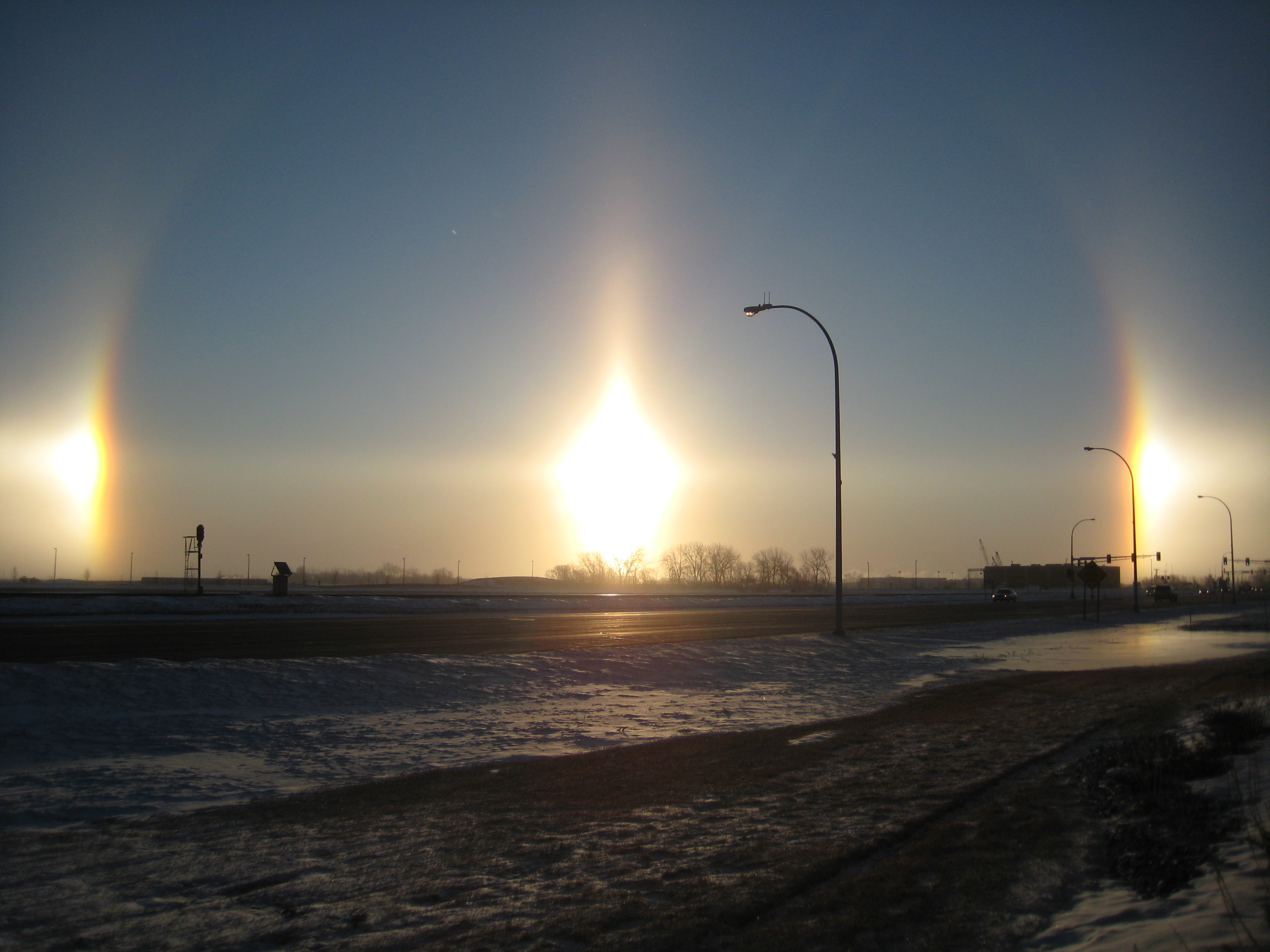
Sun dogs photographed in North Dakota in 2009

Bowyer rejected the suggestion that he had claimed to see an alien vessel, only remarking that he had "never seen anything like it before in all [his] years of flying." When interviewed by the BBC, he accepted the possibility that he had seen earthquake lights, a scientifically-debated phenomenon where flashes of light appear over areas of seismic activity, connected to the earthquake in south-eastern England that took place on 28 April.

A local astronomer, Michael Maunder, attributed Bowyer's report to sun dogs, an optical phenomenon caused by the refraction of light through ice crystals in the atmosphere. He described the weather during the flight as "just right for setting up sundogs and similar phenomena". Sun dogs appear at 22 degrees relative to the direction of the Sun from the observer, and Maunder noted that at the time of Bowyer's sighting, the lights he reported seeing would have been approximately 22 degrees from the Sun.

== Bibliography ==
- BBC News (25 April 2007). "Pilot spots 'UFO' over Guernsey".
- Campbell, Matthew (1 August 2021). "The truth is up there: how the Pentagon gave hope to Britain's UFO spotters". The Times.
- Clarke, David (2013). The UFO Files: The Inside Story of Real-life Sightings. London: Bloomsbury Publishing and the National Archives. ISBN 978-1905615506.
- Cleland, Gary (7 February 2008). "Huge rise in British UFO sightings". The Daily Telegraph.
- Dewan, William J. (2006). "'A Saucerful of Secrets': An Interdisciplinary Analysis of UFO Experiences". The Journal of American Folklore. 119 (472): 184–202. doi:10.2307/4137923. JSTOR 4137923.
- Lewis-Kraus, Gideon (30 April 2021). "How the Pentagon Started Taking U.F.O.s Seriously". The New Yorker. Archived from the original on 11 May 2023.
- Derr, John S.; St-Laurent, France; Freund, Fridemann T.; Thériault, Robert (2011). "Earthquake Lights". In Gupta, Harsh K. (ed.). Encyclopedia of Solid Earth Geophysics. Vol. 1. Dordrecht: Springer. p. 165. ISBN 978-90-481-8701-0.
- Haines, Lester (27 April 2007). "UK airline pilots spot giant UFO". The Register.
- Maunder, Michael (26 May 2007). "UFO Explanation". Alderney Journal. No. 873. St Anne, Guernsey.
- "'Mile-wide UFO' spotted by British airline pilot". The Evening Standard. 22 June 2007.
- Pretor-Pinney, Gavin (2011). The Cloud Collector's Handbook. San Francisco: Chronicle Books. ISBN 9781452105185.
- Rohrer, Finlo (4 July 2007). "Saucers in the sky". BBC News.
- United Kingdom Government (6 July 2007). "UFO Reports 2007" (PDF).
