= Mark Darby =

British airline executive (born 1959)

Robin Mark Darby
- Born: 7 July 1959 (age 67)
- Education: Hurstpierpoint College; King's School, Rochester; University of Brighton
- Occupation: Airline businessman

Robin Mark Darby (known as Mark Darby) (born 1959) was a British airline executive having now retired in December 2020. He was the former CEO of Aurigny Air Services, having previously been CEO of Baboo, LIAT and Head of Aviation Consulting at Deloitte.

== Early life and career ==
Darby attended Hurstpierpoint College, King's School, Rochester and the University of Brighton. Between Laker Airways as a planning engineer before moving to fulfil the same position at British Caledonian in 1984. Subsequently, he moved to British Airways in 1988 and a year later became Director Technical Services at Simat, Helliesen & Eichner Inc. (SH&E). In 1996, Darby joined Deloitte as Head of Aviation Consulting. He moved to IBM Global Services as a consultant before founding his own company in July 2002, Aviation Strategy Consultants, where he led the initial phase of the launch of Air Arabia. In 2003, Darby joined Unisys as a managing partner before leaving for Antigua to replace Garry Cullen as chief executive officer (CEO) of the Caribbean inter-island airline LIAT in June 2006.

=== LIAT CEO ===
Upon arrival at LIAT, Darby was given the mandate to transform a "bankrupt and inefficient regional airline that was losing EC$80 million (US$30 million) a year" by the Board and a demand by the shareholder islands to not "come back for more cash", having absorbed US$72.7m between that time and 2001. In January 2007, Darby announced a proposed merger with Caribbean Star Airlines, with which LIAT had been engaged in intense competition since 2005. However, in June 2007 the shareholder governments of Barbados, Antigua & St Vincent gave the go-ahead to the Board of Directors to buy out Caribbean Star instead. LIAT purchased Caribbean Star Airlines on 24 October 2007 and five of Caribbean Star's Bombardier Dash 8-300 aircraft were transferred to LIAT. The airline broke even in 2007 and the following year made a small profit.

However, Darby faced extensive challenges at LIAT. Alongside high operating costs, air travel taxes comprising more than 40% of airfares, small populations with low GDP per capita and the lack of ability to fund Public Service Obligation subsidies for marginal routes, a workforce of 900 had eleven separate trade unions and had suffered from poor morale due to the consequent threat of bankruptcy from cash-flow problems for several years prior to Darby's arrival. Furthermore, he had not anticipated the complexity of three islands with limited budgets having stakes in the airline, with resultant necessity for consensus in decision-making and "lack of clear shareholder direction". However, in April 2009 Darby was dismissed from LIAT over a dispute surrounding his decision to compensate workers for going beyond the call of duty, saying the payments to staffers were not exorbitant and were in the range of EC$1,000 - EC$2,000 (US$375-US$750) a month. The board claimed he had acted above his authority; he later sued successfully for unfair dismissal. He described his three years at LIAT as "fascinating and hard work, but rewarding".

=== Fly Baboo CEO ===
After a year working on various airline and air transport consultancy projects at Aviation Strategy Consultants, Darby was appointed by its shareholder (Lebanese investment group, M1) as CEO of Baboo in March 2010 with a mandate to stem its losses. Having expanded just as the late-2000s recession began to take hold, the airline had faced harsh competition from its Geneva base from easyJet Switzerland (especially on routes to Bordeaux, Nice, Rome and Toulouse). Having incurred an average load factor across the airline of below 50% between January and July 2010, Darby oversaw the suspension of routes between Geneva and London, Naples, Milan and Marseille as well as a winter seasonal service between Geneva and Oxford. In October 2010, Darby announced that the airline planned to return three of its Embraer E190 aircraft to their lessors by the end of November 2010. Darby entered into negotiations with Lugano-based Darwin Airline to sell the remaining parts of Baboo - the Geneva-based turboprop operation. On 25 November 2010, Darwin confirmed its plans to take over this remaining part of Baboo in early 2011. Once this transition was completed, the company was closed in the Autumn of 2011.

=== Aurigny Air Services CEO ===
Whilst spending a further year working at his own company (Aviation Strategy Consultants) on several consultancy projects including working with the SH&E team on the turnaround of Bahrain-based Gulf Air, Darby was appointed a non-executive director of Aurigny Air Services in September 2011 alongside Gavin St Pier and Michael Richards. In April 2013, he replaced Malcolm Hart with immediate effect as interim CEO of Aurigny but in September 2013 took up the position full-time. After Flybe announced in May 2013 that it would withdraw from London Gatwick as of March 2014, it became apparent that Aurigny would be the sole operator on Guernsey's lifeline Gatwick route. Darby oversaw a review of fleet options to carry an additional 250,000 passengers per annum on the route, an order for a 122-seat Embraer 195 jet aircraft realised in ten months (compared to the industry average of around a minimum of two years) entering service in June 2014 as the first jet aircraft operated by Aurigny in the airline's history and also additional legal protection for Aurigny's sole operator status on the route in the face of potential competition from easyJet.

Aside from work to secure the Gatwick route, in a move reflecting his previous work to allow co-operation between LIAT and Caribbean Star, Darby also oversaw a codeshare agreement on the Guernsey-Jersey route between Aurigny and competitor Blue Islands which (when it came into force on 16 March 2014) saw the former stop operating flights between the two islands for the first time since 1969. In January 2016, Aurigny and Blue Islands announced the contract for the codeshare would not be renewed, after Blue Islands became a franchise partner with Flybe and restrictions on the latter's inter-island operation were lifted by the States of Guernsey the previous year. Furthermore, following a successful trial in November 2013, Darby led efforts to replace the forty-year-old Britten-Norman Trislander fleet with Dornier 228s to serve routes from Alderney and to France, as well as overseeing the launch of new year-round routes to London City and Leeds Bradford as well as seasonal links to Barcelona, Norwich and London Luton. Darby envisages that Aurigny's Embraer 195 as well as its sole operator status on its flagship Gatwick route helped it towards profit in 2016. In 2017, following the delayed arrival of the second Dornier 228'NG' aircraft, Darby was finally able to decommission the last Trislander aircraft out of the fleet. In 2018 he oversaw the launch of a new web sales platform that was developed by the company to provide its customers with a much improved user experience and greater operational flexibility. It also facilitated the development of further self-help tools for customers as well as permitting increased ancillary revenues. Also in 2018, Darby negotiated the purchase of 3 new ATR 72-600 aircraft equipped with 'Clearvision' technology. The acquisition was funded by a loan from RBSI. The aircraft were delivered in late 2019. In 2020, Darby led the company through the Covid-19 pandemic, developing tactics and initiatives aimed at helping the business remain operationally ready throughout the crisis. Recognising an opportunity, he was instrumental in developing an 'airbridge' between Covid-free Guernsey and Isle of Man - providing the opportunity for 7000 islanders to travel between the islands on short-break holidays. In August 2020 it was announced that Darby had informed the Board of Aurigny (in February 2020) of his decision to retire in the spring of 2021.
