= Alderney Airport =

Airport in the Channel Islands

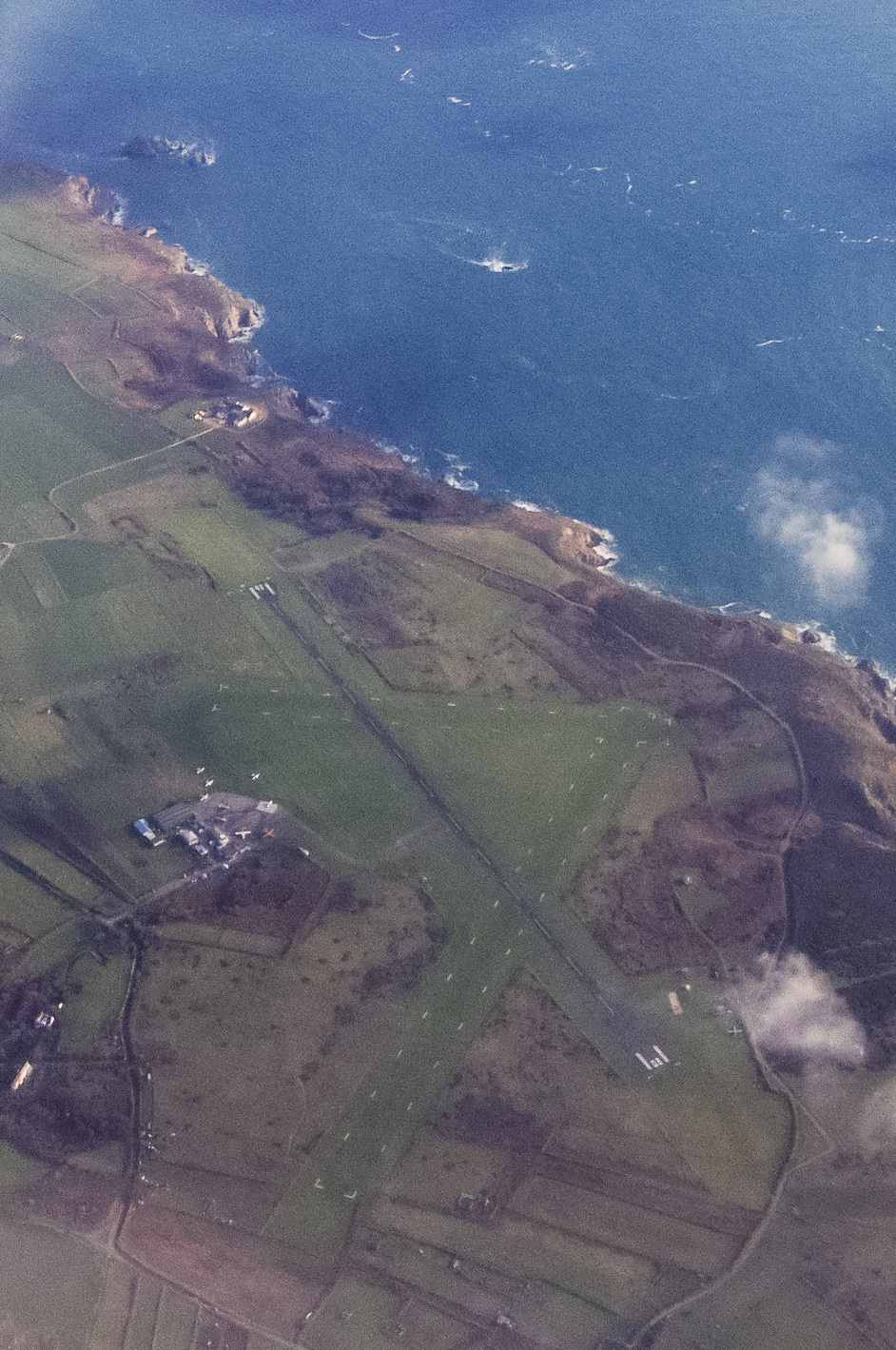
- IATA: ACI; ICAO: EGJA

Summary
- Airport type: Public
- Operator: States of Guernsey
- Serves: Alderney
- Location: La Grande Blaye
- Elevation AMSL: 290 ft (88 m)
- Coordinates: 49°42′24″N 002°12′52″W
- Website: alderney.gov.gg/article/4153/Airport

Map
- Location in the Channel Islands Location relative to France and Great Britain

Runways
Direction	Length		Surface
Direction	m	ft	Surface
08/26	877	2,877	Asphalt/grass
13/31	733	2,405	Grass
03/21	497	1,631	Grass

Statistics (2024)
- Passengers: 47,736
- Passenger change 23-24: ▼4%
- Aircraft movements: 7,102
- Movements change 23-24: ▼2%
- Sources: UK AIP at NATS; Statistics from the UK Civil Aviation Authority

Alderney Airport (IATA: ACI, ICAO: EGJA) is the only airport on the island of Alderney, Guernsey. Built in 1935, Alderney Airport was the first airport in the Channel Islands. Located on the Blaye (1 NM (1.9 km; 1.2 mi) southwest of St Anne), it is the closest Channel Island airport to the south coast of England and the coast of France. Its facilities include an air traffic control tower, a hangar, and the Airport Fire Station.

== Runways ==
Alderney is unique amongst Channel Islands airports in having three operational runways. The main runway, 08/26 is 880 m (2,887 ft) long and is mainly asphalt. The two secondary runways are both grass, 13/31 being 733 m (2,405 ft) long, with 03/21 having a length of 497 m (1,631 ft). The main runway is equipped with low-intensity lighting, with portable lighting being available on runway 13/31. The approach and runway lights were replaced in 2006.

== Operations ==
The terminal building, erected in 1968, contains an arrivals room and a departure lounge, with a check-in desk for the airport's only scheduled airline, Aurigny. Alderney is not a 24-hour airport; during winter, it is open Monday to Saturday from 0740 until 1830 and on Sunday from 0840 until 1830. During summer, it is open Monday to Thursday from 0740 until 1830 and Friday to Sunday from 0740 until 1920.

The airport also has its own non-directional beacon, with runways 08 and 26 utilizing this for instrument approaches during Instrument meteorological conditions. Both runways also have an approved GPS (satellite) approach. This means that aircraft can land in lower visibility.

Alderney has self-manoeuvring stands. Formal stands are not required due to the lack of space to accommodate nose-in-configured aircraft.

== Airlines and destinations ==
Airlines	Destinations
Aurigny	Guernsey, Southampton
Finist'air	Seasonal: Jersey

For many years, the only direct scheduled links from the island were Southampton and Guernsey. Routes to other destinations such as Brighton, Bournemouth, Cherbourg, Exeter, Plymouth and Jersey were abandoned over the years due to what Blue Islands, for example, claimed was 'lack of interest'. These routes had been operated on and off by Aurigny and Blue Islands, but also Alderney Air Ferries, Air Sarnia, and Air Camelot during the 1970s and 1980s. The number of air routes to the island is at its lowest since the Second World War, except for a brief intermission during the 1967-8 period, when another airline (Glos Air, later to be Aurigny Air Services) was founded to fill the void (see below right).

From September 2013, airline Aurigny operated direct flights to Jersey on a trial basis for a period of six weeks.

In April 2015, it was announced that the States of Alderney had asked airline Citywing to operate a seasonal Summer service between Alderney and Jersey using Let L-410 aircraft. However this service has not materialised.

In January 2017, a new airline Air Alderney was set up with the intention of commencing direct flights using Britten-Norman Islander aircraft from Alderney to destinations including Jersey, Cherbourg, Lee-on–Solent, and Brighton. Despite considerable progress being made in acquiring aircraft and obtaining an Air Operator's Certificate, to date, operations have not yet commenced due to complications regarding ground operations at the intended destination airports.

== Future ==
The States of Alderney set aside £400,000 from the £1 million allocated for a £12 million airport expansion proposed in 2019. This was to be used to pay for the redevelopment of the terminal, which is over 50 years old. During the 2020 COVID lockdown, while aircraft movements were low, airport staff refurbished the buildings, including repairs to a leaky flat roof on the 1960s terminal, and patched the runway.

The runway was previously resurfaced in 1999 with a surface material having a design life of between 12 and 15 years. A major patch and repair was undertaken on the eastern end of the runway in the Autumn of 2016 to provide a short-term improvement, but by 2018, it was reported that major work would soon be required for continued safe operations. In 2020, the runway was patched and repaired during the covid lockdown by airport staff.

On 4 July 2022, the States of Alderney backed plans to extend the runway from 2,877 ft (877m) to about 3,444 ft (1,050m) so that larger aircraft such as the ATR 72 plane can serve the island, giving an additional 20,000 seats per year to help tourism. The terminal building and fire station would also be improved as part of the scheme. Aurigny Air Services Ltd also stated that the expansion would reduce its operating costs by allowing it to retire the Dornier 228 from its fleet.

In December 2022 the States of Guernsey agreed to spend £24m on extending, widening and strengthening the runway, construction of a new terminal building and refurbishment of the fire service facilities. £3.5 million will be contributed towards the costs by the States of Alderney.

It was reported in January 2023 that land acquisition to allow the runway extension and repositioning of the track to the west had already started. It was also reported that tenders would be issued in the next few months, but work to secure Civil Aviation Authority and European Union Aviation Safety Agency approval for designs for the work would be needed, before issuing construction tenders. It was expected that Work would begin in 2024 and would be completed in the second quarter of 2025. Plans were approved in May 2024. However the project collapsed later in 2024 when the cheapest tender came in £13m over budget.

In February 2026 it was reported that Deputies at the States of Guernsey voted in favour of spending £24 million to refurbish Alderney Airport runway with the aim of starting the work in 2027. The repairs include resurfacing and realigning the main asphalt runway, which is set to be widened from 18 metres (59 ft) to 23 metres (75 ft), along with making taxiway improvements, but the runway length would remain the same at 870 metres (2,850 ft).

In June 2026 it was reported that the £24 million Runway Rehabilitation Project remained on track.

== Statistics ==
Year	Passenger Numbers	Year	Passenger Numbers	Year	Passenger Numbers	Year	Passenger Numbers
1989	102,649	1999	77,198	2009	74,835	2019	50,562
1990	105,458	2000	75,199	2010	70,012	2020	27,211
1991	80,684	2001	72,111	2011	69,546	2021	42,261
1992	78,365	2002	72,861	2012	64,165	2022	51,646
1993	77,313	2003	72,248	2013	62,855	2023	49,546
1994	83,681	2004	74,292	2014	61,317	2024	47,736
1995	84,834	2005	76,205	2015	59,843	2025	
1996	84,012	2006	76,806	2016	57,595		
1997	81,048	2007	79,087	2017	54,760		
1998	73,099	2008	77,104	2018	53,343		
