= Aurigny =

Flag carrier airline of Guernsey

Aurigny Air Services

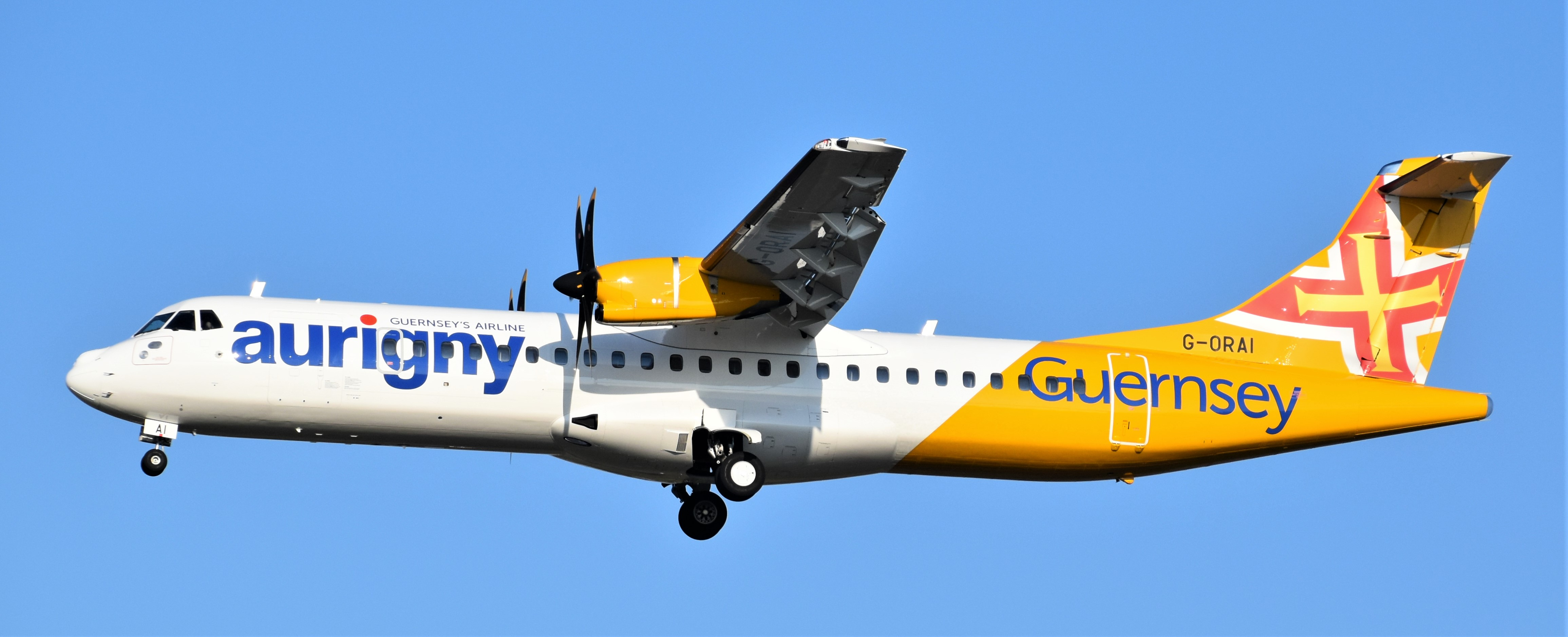
- An Aurigny ATR 72-600
IATA	ICAO	Call sign
GR	AUR	AYLINE
- Founded: 24 January 1964 as Glos Air Ltd; 19 February 1968 as Aurigny Air Services Ltd
- AOC #: 373
- Hubs: Guernsey
- Focus cities: Saint Anne
- Frequent-flyer program: Aurigny Frequent Flyer
- Fleet size: 6
- Destinations: 29
- Headquarters: Guernsey Airport, Guernsey, Channel Islands
- Key people: Nico Bezuidenhout (CEO); Kevin George (chairman)
- Founder: Sir Derrick Bailey: 19 February 1968 as Aurigny Air Services Ltd
- Profit: ▼£6.0 million loss (2024)
- Employees: 321
- Website: www.aurigny.com

Aurigny Air Services Limited, commonly known as Aurigny (/ˈɔːrɪni/OR-ree-nee), is the flag carrier airline of the Bailiwick of Guernsey. Its head office is located next to Guernsey Airport in the Channel Islands, and it has been wholly owned by the States of Guernsey since it was nationalised in 2003. It operates regular passenger and freight services to the Channel Islands, France, the Republic of Ireland and the United Kingdom. Its main base is situated next to Guernsey Airport, with other aircraft and crew based at Alderney Airport.

Aurigny is one of the longest serving regional airlines in the world, and is the second oldest established airline in Britain after Loganair. It was originally founded to provide an air service between Guernsey and the nearby island of Alderney, and its name is derived from the French name for that island.

== History ==
=== Early years ===
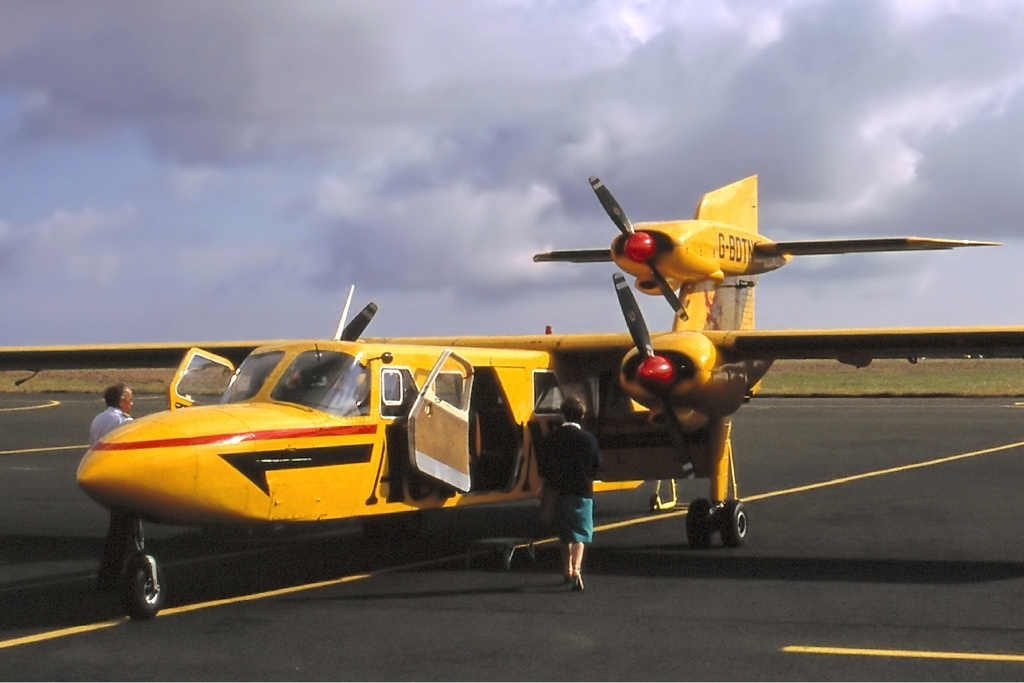
An Aurigny Trislander at Jersey Airport in August 1989

Aurigny Air Services was founded by Sir Derrick Bailey and started operations on March 1, 1968, after British United Airways withdrew from the Alderney to Guernsey route. It initially operated Britten-Norman Islander aircraft, developing a highly efficient network linking the Channel Islands with each other and with France and the United Kingdom. During the first year of operations, the airline carried 45,000 passengers between Guernsey, Jersey, and Alderney.

Aurigny became the first commercial operator of the Britten-Norman Trislander in July 1971; the airline remained the world's largest operator of the type until its retirement. The use of this larger aircraft enabled the route network to be expanded to include the south coast of England and northern France. In 1977, Aurigny banned smoking on all services, the first ever airline to do so. In 1979, it acquired Anglo Normandy Aviation, which was established in 1975. In 1993, Aurigny won a contract to carry mail between the Channel Islands and the UK, and in 1999 it began daily services from Guernsey to London Stansted Airport and Amsterdam Schiphol, operated by Saab 340 aircraft. The latter route was later dropped due to poor demand, but its introduction marked the airline's transition from a local carrier to a regional airline.

=== Regional transition ===
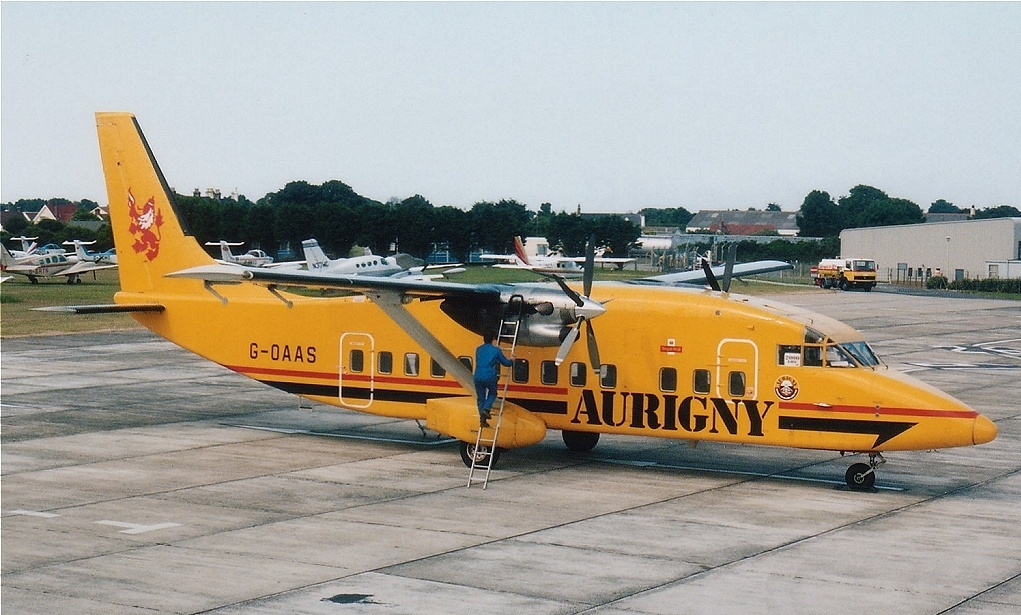
A Short 360 at Guernsey Airport in July 1995. The airline no longer operates the type.

Ownership of the airline passed from Aurigny Aviation Holdings to Close Brothers Private Equity on 23 May 2000. On 15 May 2003, it was wholly acquired by the States of Guernsey. The acquisition came following an announcement that British Airways was to cease operating their route between London Gatwick and Guernsey, just two months before Guernsey was slated to host the 2003 Island Games.

On 21 June 2007, Aurigny got permission from its sole shareholder, the States of Guernsey, to raise a private loan to purchase two new ATR 72-500 aircraft, which entered service in March 2009.

In March 2009, the airline announced that it was to operate a route between Guernesy and London Stansted Airport, and that it would begin a service from Guernsey to East Midlands Airport. Daily flights to those destinations commenced from 1 May 2009, and the airline additionally increased the frequency of flights between Guernsey and London Gatwick from four to five daily return flights. In August 2009, Aurigny announced that it would be operating winter flights to Grenoble using its ATR 72-500 aircraft. The flights ran from 26 December 2009 to midway through February 2010. The route was repeated for the 2010/2011 winter season, but flights continued until March. This extension did not prove viable, and the route halted in mid-February from the 2011/2012 season onwards. Aurigny noted that they sold more tickets to Grenoble in the 2011/2012 season, despite the reduced service.

=== Recent history ===
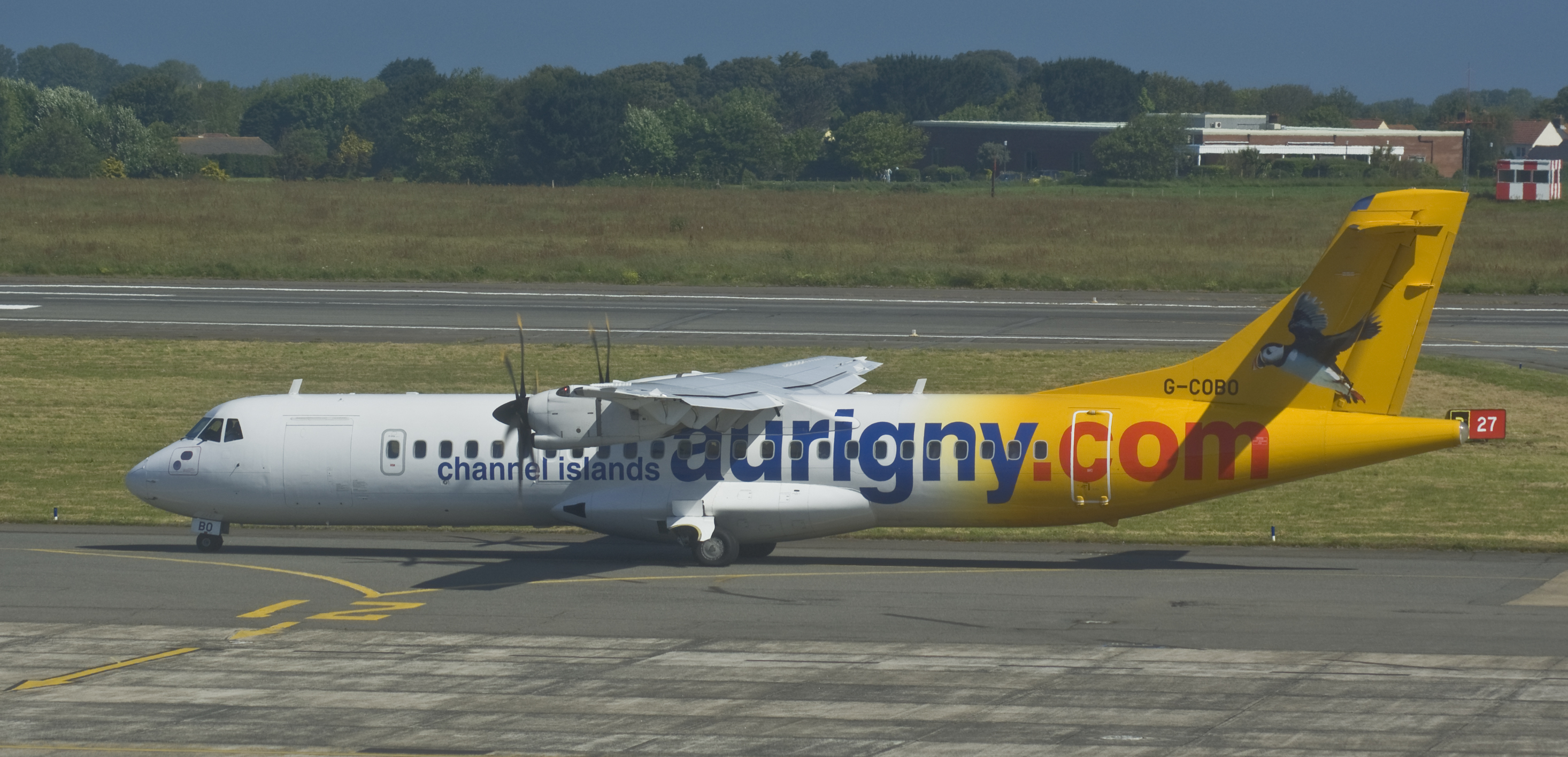
An Aurigny ATR 72 taxiing at Guernsey Airport in May 2009

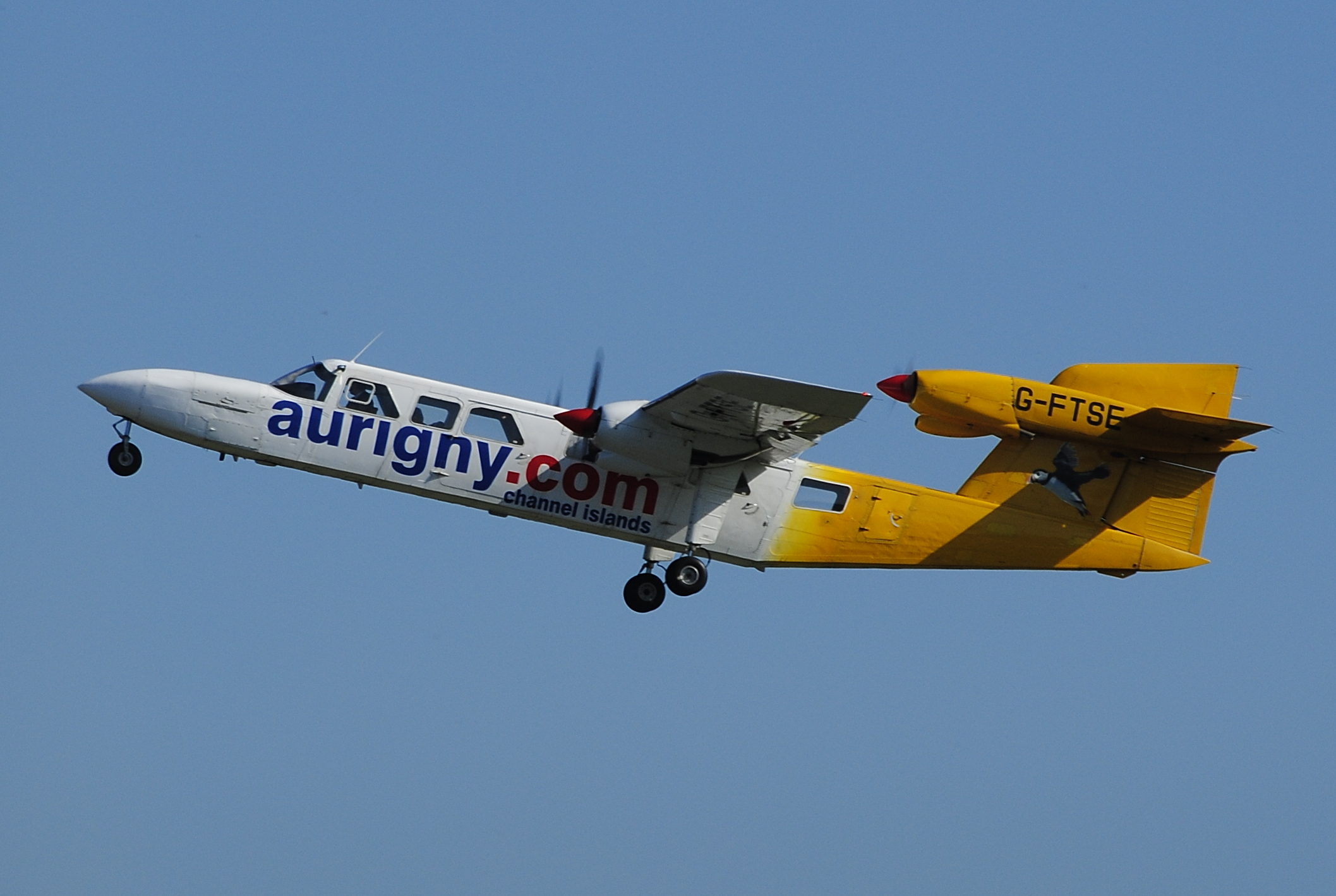
In April 2014 Aurigny announced that it would retire its fleet of Trislanders.

In July 2010, it was announced that Blue Islands was planning to buy Aurigny, and was undergoing a due diligence process with the Treasury and Resources department of the States of Guernsey. This sparked major debate throughout the islands, and a Facebook page in opposition to the proposed buy-out gained 530 members. On 14 September, Treasury and Resources announced that the sale would not go ahead.

Blue Islands' withdrawal from Alderney on 9 May 2011 left Aurigny with a monopoly on services to that island for the first time in over a decade. However, it was criticised later that year for cutting the number of flights between Alderney and Southampton, not lowering prices and reducing services to twice daily over that winter; managing director Malcolm Hart later reaffirmed the airline's commitment to the route and admitted that encouraging passengers to fly via Guernsey had been 'the biggest mistake in Aurigny's recent history'. At the end of 2011, in cooperation with Eurocontrol, Aurigny rolled out the first GPS approach system in Europe, for use by its Trislanders at Alderney and Southampton airports. The system, based on the European Geostationary Navigation Overlay Service, allowed flights to operate in lower visibility and in poorer weather than before.

In October 2013, Mark Darby joined the company as CEO after six months as a non-executive director. Under his leadership, Aurigny initiated an eight-week trial for the Dornier 228 as a replacement for the Trislander fleet, leasing the aircraft from Sevenair. It later purchased one of the 228 variant of the aircraft and two of the 228NG variant. The aircraft arrived through 2014 and 2015.

After Flybe announced that it would withdraw from the London Gatwick – Guernsey route by March 2014, Aurigny became the sole operator on that route, and ordered an Embraer 195 to meet the increased demand. The aircraft was delivered on 24 June 2014, and a similar aircraft was wet leased from Flybe between March and June to provide capacity in the interim. Given substantial government investment in fleet acquisition, and its monopoly position on the Gatwick route, Aurigny struck an agreement with the States of Guernesy in April 2014, committing to offer 65% of fares for £65.00 or less. Additionally, in January 2014 Aurigny applied to the States of Guernsey to operate a Guernsey – London City service, with an aim of starting the route from May 2014. Due to delays in aircraft procurement, the route commenced on 8 September 2014, initially operated under a wet lease agreement with VLM Airlines.

After ten years of competition with Blue Islands on the Jersey – Guernsey inter-island route, in March 2014 Aurigny signed a codeshare agreement with the airline for Jersey – Guernsey inter-island services. The deal, which marked the cessation of Aurigny flights from Jersey for the first time since 1969, saw Blue Islands take over all flying on the route and Aurigny oversee ground-handling of Blue Islands flights in Guernsey. Each airline sold 50% of available seats, and the contract was initially signed for two years. In January 2016, Aurigny and Blue Islands announced the contract for the codeshare would not be renewed, after Blue Islands became a franchise partner with Flybe and the States of Guernsey had lifted its restriction on Flybe's inter-island services the previous year.

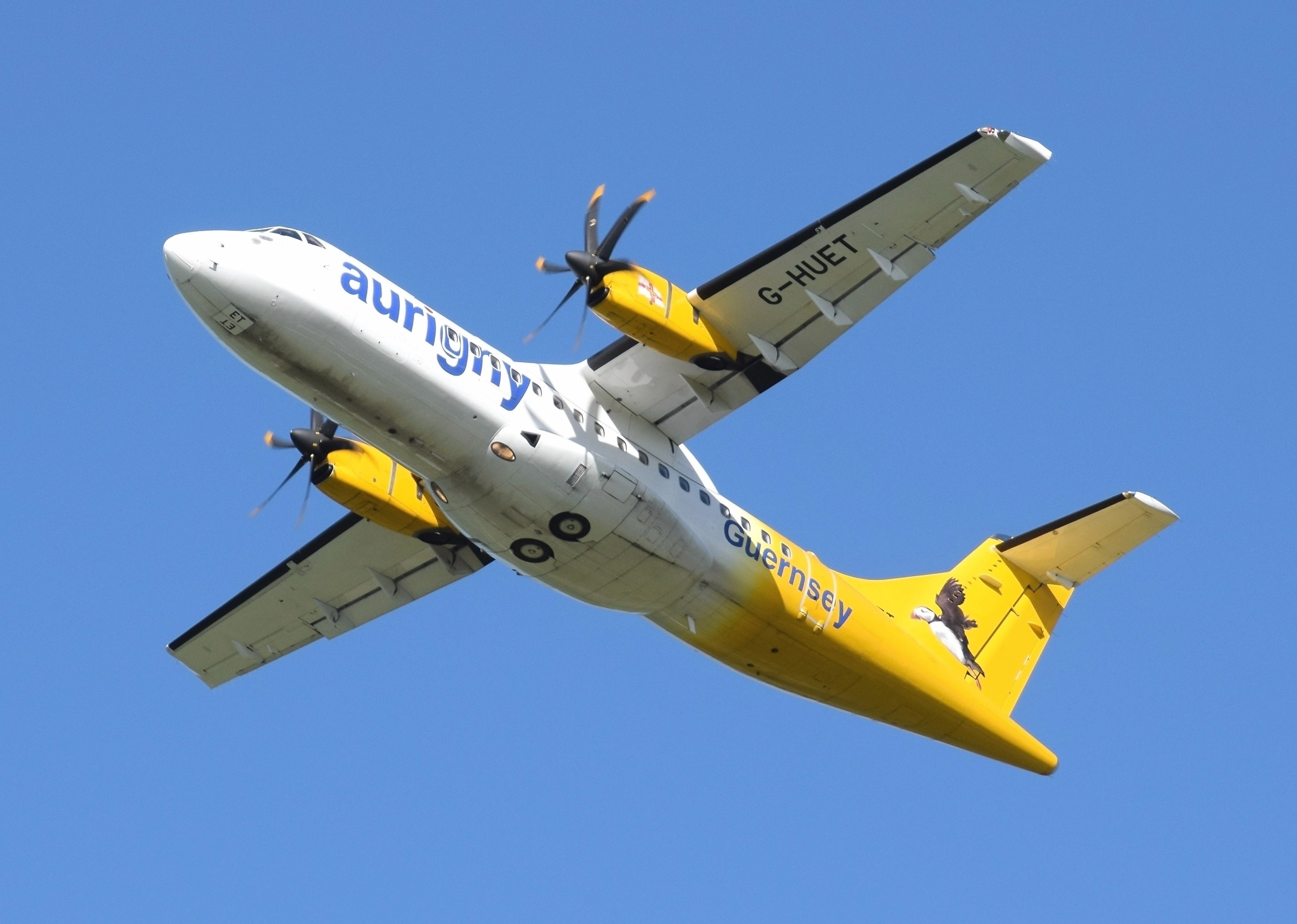
An Aurigny ATR 42-500, 2016

In April 2015, Aurigny acquired an ATR 42-500 on dry lease from Nordic Aviation Capital for use on London City – Guernsey services, and as a back-up aircraft. In December of that year, Aurigny announced a new year-round route from Guernsey to Leeds Bradford (commencing 27 May 2016), and a summer seasonal service to Norwich (commencing 14 May 2016), using its ATR 42 and ATR 72 aircraft. In February 2016, Aurigny announced that it would operate a summer seasonal service from Guernsey to Barcelona, to be operated by its Embraer 195 over four weekends from 23 July to 13 August 2016. Additionally, it applied to operate a summer seasonal service between Guernsey and London Luton from March 2017.

In November 2015, the States of Guernsey agreed to recapitalise Aurigny's holding company, Cabernet Ltd, by paying off £25m of existing and expected debt. The airline signed a Memorandum of Understanding with the States of Guernsey and the States of Alderney, putting in place a system of communication between the three parties as well as a basic service level agreement, in February 2016.

In August 2020, Mark Darby announced his retirement from Aurigny. He was replaced by Nico Bezuidenhout, who had previously founded and served as CEO at the (now defunct) South African low-cost carrier Mango. That same year, it was announced that chairman Andrew Haining would also be stepping down. His replacement, Kevin George, was formerly CEO of Monarch Airlines, and worked as a non-executive director at the Isles of Scilly Steamship Company, the parent company of the Cornish regional airline Isles of Scilly Skybus.

In October 2024, Aurigny announced it had spent around £300,000 on improvements in accessibility, including improved aisle seats, adjustable armrests, and additional boarding ramps. The airline stated that the purpose of the improvements was to "provide greater comfort and ease" and "offer better protection from the elements" to passengers with reduced mobility when boarding and disembarking flights.

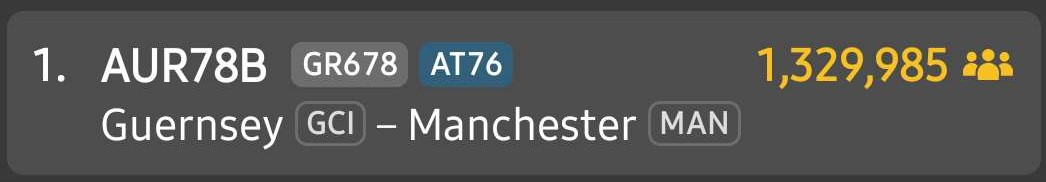
GR678 at its most tracked period.

In August 2025, a routine flight from Guernsey to Manchester gained significant attention on the flight-tracking platform Flightradar24. Operated as GR678, it became the most tracked flight on the site during that period, with over 1.3 million users monitoring it simultaneously. This surge in interest placed the flight among the most tracked flights so far on Flightradar24.

== Corporate affairs ==
=== Ownership and structure ===
Before 2024, Aurigny Air Services Limited and Anglo Norman Aero Engineering Limited were 100% held by Cabernet Limited, a holding company owned by the States of Guernesy. In 2024, the company was restructured; Anglo Norman Aero Engineering was amalgamated into Aurigny Air Services and Cabernet Limited was dissolved, so that Aurigny Air Services became directly owned by the States of Guernesy.

=== Business trends ===
Aurigny has frequently made a loss in its operations, however, the airline is considered essential for the island's economy and public services. A May 2017 strategic review by the States of Guernsey Policy and Resources Committee stated that "Aurigny’s objectives should focus on supporting economic enablement and providing a backbone of air services to support the Bailiwick [of Guernsey]’s economy and its growth, providing access to affordable air travel to the UK."

Trading figures have been released for Cabernet Limited, and from 2024, Aurigny Air Services Ltd, with promises of increasing transparency. The key trends over recent years, from annual accounts and press statements, are shown below (for years ending 31 December):

	2013	2014	2015	2016	2017	2018	2019	2020	2021	2022	2023	2024
Turnover (£M)	31.4	40.7	44.9	44.7	44.7	45.5	45.0	12.1	17.8	44.2	54.8	57.3
Net profit (£M)	−3.9	−2.9	−3.2	−5.2	−5.2	−4.4	−9.7	−28.6	−14.9	4.2	-1.8	-6.0
Number of employees (FTE)				280	313	312		275	291			321
Number of passengers (000s)	477	557		550	544	531		140	370	520		571
Passenger load factor (%)												
Number of aircraft (at year end)			10	9	9	9	12	6				7
Notes/sources												

=== Criticism ===
On 9 June 2017, Aurigny withdrew Alderney's medevac service outside of normal hours, meaning the island's residents could only be transferred to hospital during working hours. Outside of normal hours, medical transfers became the responsibility of the Royal National Lifeboat Institution. The airline blamed a lack of staff. The States of Guernsey said it was trying to work with Aurigny to address the issue.

In February 2020, William Tate, President of the States of Alderney, addressed a meeting of the UK Parliament's All-Parliamentary Channel Islands Group, speaking against the possibility that Aurigny would terminate its direct service between Alderney and the UK mainland. He stated, "We have an airline which is state-owned and operated by Aurigny. It was started in Alderney 51 years ago and, without going into all the whys and wherefores, that service is unlikely to be provided in the future in the same way that it has been historically. So we’re going to be faced with a reduction in our capacity which will seriously damage our economic prospects. Half of the seats on the Southampton to Alderney service are filled by tourists. That service could well end. And anyone wishing to visit Alderney will have to visit via Guernsey. That’s a massive disincentive economically."

In March 2026, Alderney's Policy & Finance Committee (P&F) raised concerns to Guernsey's States' Trading Supervisory Board (STSB) following a period of flight disruption linked to technical issues, poor weather conditions and training complications. Since the latter months of 2025, Aurigny's Dornier 228NG fleet had been replaced by DHC-6 Twin Otter aircraft under a partnership with Isles of Scilly Skybus. In response, Deputy Mark Helyar, President of the STSB, argued that services had improved "by any reasonable measure" and that it was a “breach of protocol” for the P&F to contact the STSB. Following this exchange, 200 protestors gathered at Alderney Airport on 22 March 2026 in response to a series of cancellations made by Aurigny following staff sickness and low crew numbers at Skybus. Aurigny CEO Nico Bezuidenhout spoke directly to the protesters, apologising for the disruption.

== Destinations ==
=== Destinations ===
As of October 2026, Aurigny serves the following destinations:

Country	City/region	Airport	Notes	Refs
France	Grenoble	Alpes–Isère Airport	Seasonal	
France	Paris	Charles de Gaulle Airport		
Guernsey	Alderney	Alderney Airport	Focus city	
Guernsey	Guernsey	Guernsey Airport	Hub	
Ireland	Dublin	Dublin Airport	Seasonal	
Jersey	Jersey	Jersey Airport		
Netherlands	Groningen	Groningen Airport Eelde	Seasonal Charter	
United Kingdom	Birmingham	Birmingham Airport		
United Kingdom	Bristol	Bristol Airport		
United Kingdom	Exeter	Exeter Airport		
United Kingdom	Edinburgh	Edinburgh Airport	Seasonal	
United Kingdom	Leeds/Bradford	Leeds Bradford Airport	Terminated	
United Kingdom	London	Gatwick Airport		
United Kingdom	London	London City Airport		
United Kingdom	Manchester	Manchester Airport		
United Kingdom	Southampton	Southampton Airport		
United Kingdom	Teesside	Teesside Airport	Seasonal Charter	

=== Codeshare and interline agreements ===
Aurigny has codeshare and interline agreements with the following airlines (as of July 2022):

- British Airways
- Emirates
- Loganair

== Fleet ==
=== Current fleet ===
As of July 2026, Aurigny operates the following aircraft:

Aurigny Air Services fleet
Aircraft	In service	Orders	Passengers	Notes
ATR 72-600	6	—	72	3 aircraft built with external fog cameras
De Havilland Canada DHC-6 Twin Otter	—	2	17	To be damp leased from Isles of Scilly Skybus

=== Former fleet ===
Aurigny's former fleet
Aircraft	Number operated	Introduced	Retired
ATR 42-500	2	2008	2020
ATR 72-202	3	2003	2016
ATR 72-211	3	2003	2014
ATR 72-500	3	2009	2020
British Aerospace 146	1	2003	2004
Britten-Norman Trislander	15	1971	2017
De Havilland Canada DHC-6 Twin Otter	2	1980	1984
Dornier 228NG	2	2015	2026
Embraer 195	1	2014	2024
Saab 340	6	1999	2005
Short 360	Unknown	Unknown	2006

=== Fleet development ===
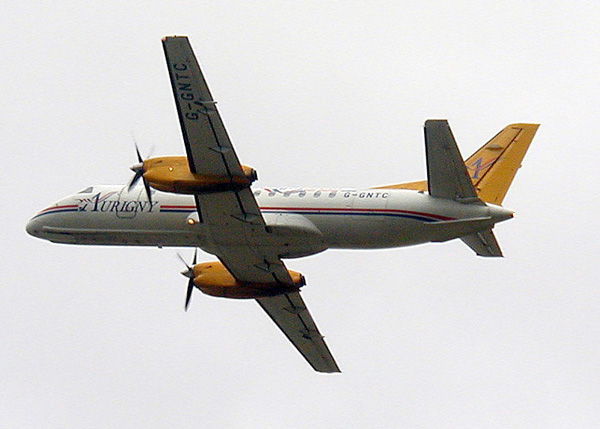
A former Aurigny Saab 340 in 2003, sporting an older livery.

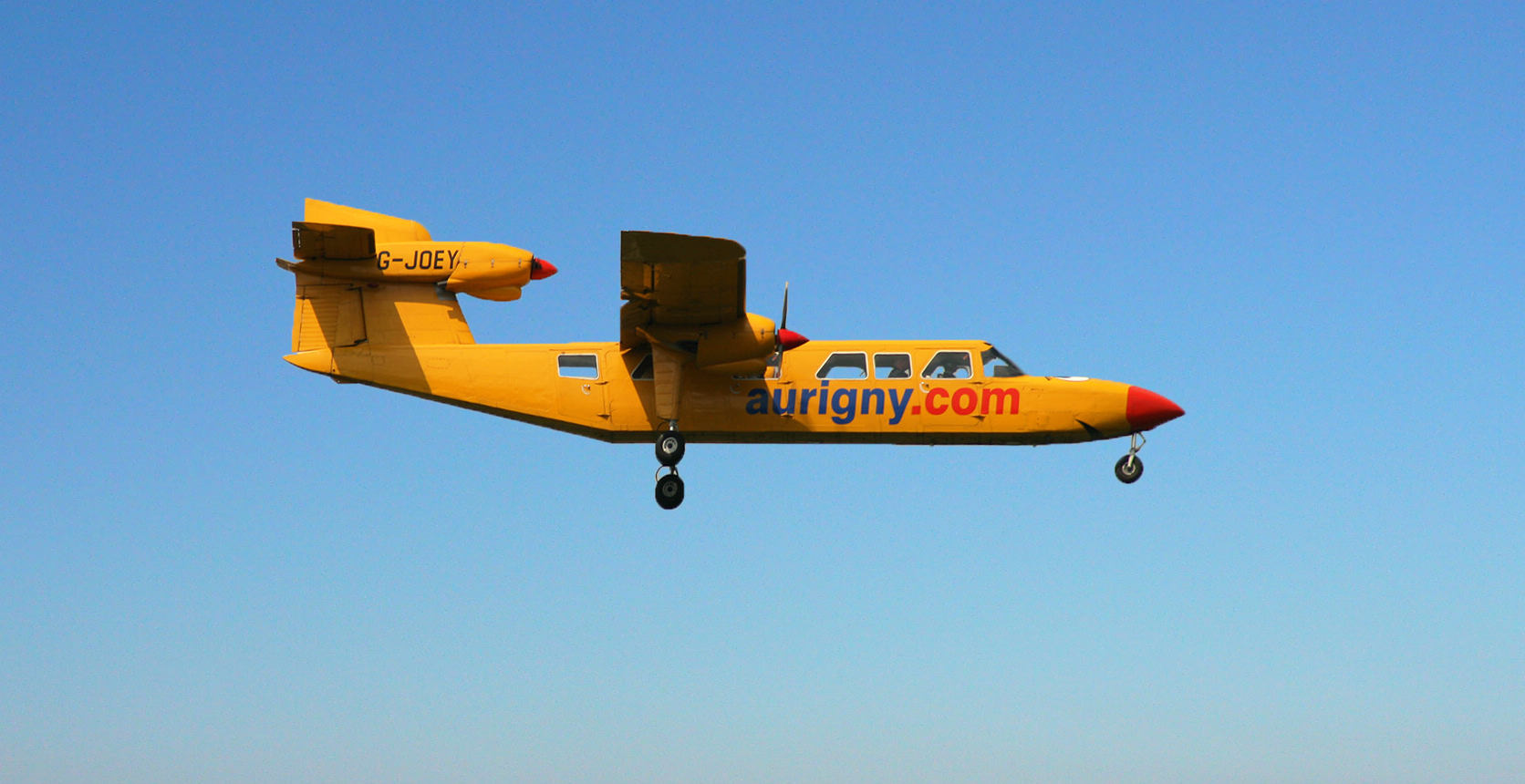
A former Aurigny Britten-Norman Trislander G-JOEY - made famous by the "Joey Club" (founded in 1986) and book series

The airline formerly operated the following aircraft types: the ATR 42-500 (retired 2020), the ATR 72-500, 3 Dornier 228s (1 more was used for trials in 2013), the de Havilland Canada DHC-6 Twin Otter (retired by mid-1980s), the Short 360 (retired 2006) and the Saab 340 (retired early 2000s) as well as leasing a British Aerospace 146 (for summer 2003 charters) and a Boeing 737-300 from Titan Airways to stand in for unserviceable aircraft.

Aurigny announced in April 2014 that it would retire its last five Trislanders and replace them with three second-hand Dornier 228s, noting that "the cost of keeping [the Trislanders] in the air is now prohibitively expensive". The programme to replace the Trislanders was expected to cost £3 million, with the airline asking the States of Guernsey for a loan in order to fund its Dornier acquisition.

Aurigny's flagship Trislander aircraft, nicknamed "Joey" after its registration G-JOEY, gained popular affection over time and a campaign was established to have it put on display in Guernsey rather than being sold. The aircraft made its final flight on 28 June 2015, and in November of that year it was announced that it would be preserved on the island. In March 2016 Oatlands Village, a local tourist attraction, was revealed to be Joey's probable new home, subject to permission for construction of a suitable building to house the Trislander. "Oaty & Joey's Playbarn" opened in January 2019 with G-JOEY suspended from the ceiling as a static exhibit.

Aurigny's sole Embraer 195 left the fleet on 31 May 2024, positioning on flight number GR195P to Exeter where it will be prepared for its new owner. The Embraer's retirement came ahead of Aurigny dry-leasing in two additional ATR 72-600s, one from NAC and the other from Jetstream Aviation Capital which were due in July and September 2024 respectively. These ATRs will not however have ATR's ClearVision enhanced vision system (EVS), which is installed on the Aurigny owned ATR72-600s.

== Accidents and incidents ==
On 23 April 2007, Ray Bowyer, a pilot of an Aurigny Trislander flying south towards Alderney, reported his sighting of unidentified flying objects. Bowyer said he saw two bright objects the size of a Boeing 737. Two passengers on Bowyer's aircraft said they saw unusual-coloured lights at the same time, alongside sightings from a Blue Islands pilot.
