= Jersey Airport =

Airport in Jersey, Channel Islands

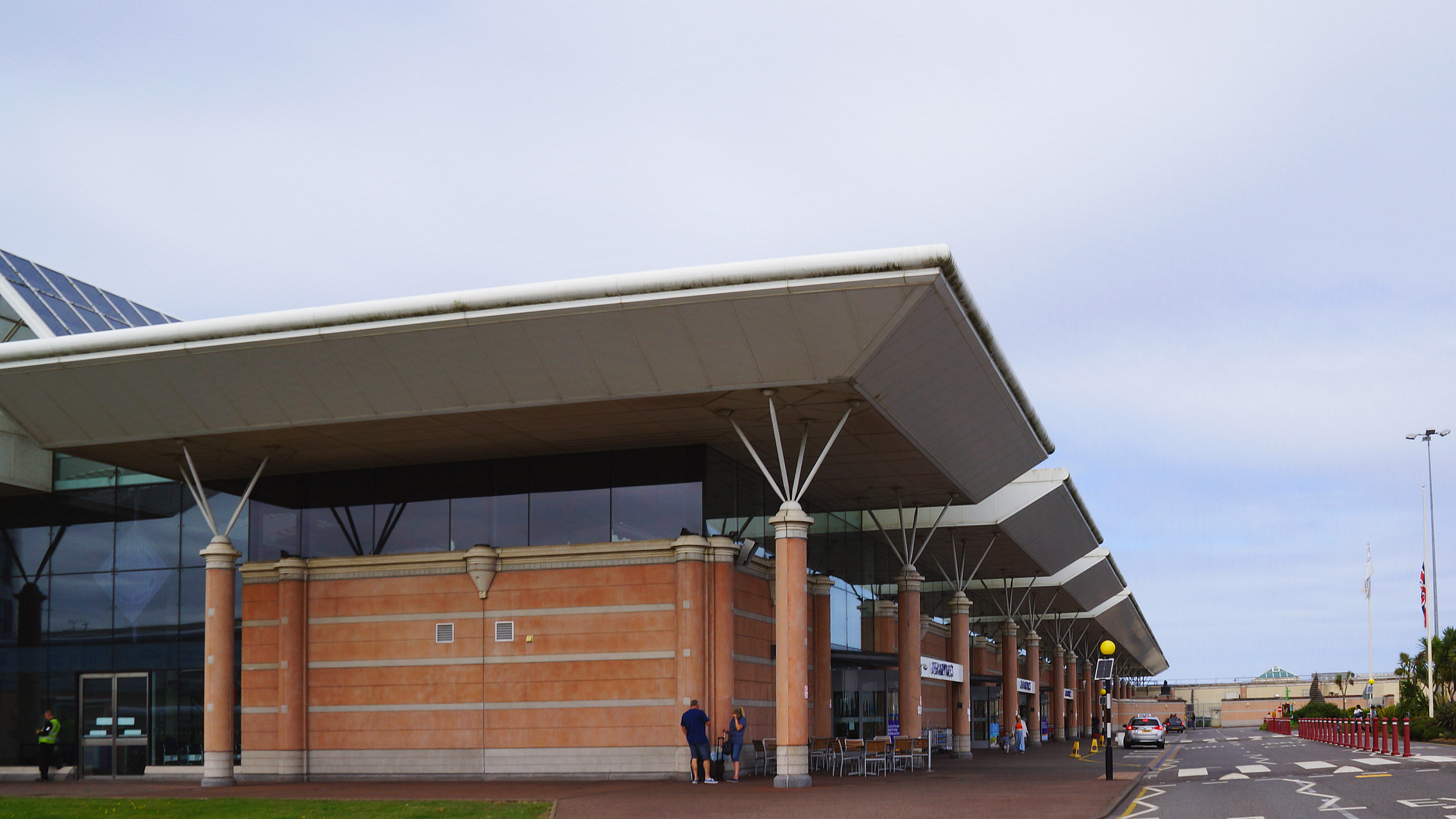
- IATA: JER; ICAO: EGJJ

Summary
- Airport type: Public
- Operator: Jersey Airport
- Serves: Jersey
- Location: Saint Peter, Jersey
- Opened: 10 March 1937 (89 years ago)
- Elevation AMSL: 277 ft (84 m)
- Coordinates: 49°12′29″N 002°11′43″W
- Website: www.jerseyairport.com

Map
- Location on Jersey Location relative to the United Kingdom EGJJ (France) EGJJ (Europe)

Runways
Direction	Length		Surface
Direction	m	ft	Surface
08/26	1,706	5,597	Asphalt

Statistics (2025)
- Passengers: 1,453,675
- Passenger Change 24-25: ▼1.1%
- Aircraft Movements: 30,324
- Movements Change 24-25: ▲2.7%
- Sources: UK AIP at NATS; Statistics from the UK Civil Aviation Authority

Jersey Airport (IATA: JER, ICAO: EGJJ) is an international airport located in the parish of Saint Peter, 4 NM (7.4 km; 4.6 mi) west northwest of Saint Helier in Jersey, in the Channel Islands.

== History ==
=== Foundation and early years ===
Air service to Jersey before 1937 consisted of biplane airliners and some seaplanes landing on the beach at St. Aubin's Bay. Jersey Airways and Imperial Airways were among those who operated to the island before the Second World War, but conditions were difficult as tides governed timetables. It was also difficult to prevent members of the public from walking across the landing area, and any aircraft that had mechanical problems had to be dragged up the slipways until the tide receded.

The States of Jersey decided to build an airport, which opened on 10 March 1937 with four grass runways, the longest being 2,940 ft (896 m) with a concrete centreline.

==== Royal Naval Air Station Jersey ====
In early March 1940 the Admiralty took over Jersey airport, to use as a Naval Air Station, known as Royal Naval Air Station Jersey, or RNAS Jersey. 755 Naval Air Squadron, a Telegraphist Air Gunner Training Squadron and 763 Naval Air Squadron, Torpedo, Spotter, Reconnaissance Pool No.1 arrived on 11 March 1940. On 21 May 1940, 826 Naval Air Squadron arrived for one weeks operation, departing on 29 May. However, due to the German occupation of France and the proximity to the Channel Islands, the Government concluded the Islands were not defendable, and both 755 NAS and 763 NAS were withdrawn on 31 May 1940, with RNAS Jersey closing on the same day. 816 Naval Air Squadron briefly used Jersey Airport between 6 and 11 June 1940; however, on 1 July 1940 the Island was occupied by German forces.

Concrete taxiways were added during the World War II occupation by the Luftwaffe; they also built hangars, one of which, the Jersey Airlines hangar, is still in existence, although no longer used.

=== Development after WWII ===
A 4,200 ft (1,280 m) tarmac runway was opened in 1952 and the grass strips were closed. A feature of the airport in the 1950s was the traffic control system: traffic-lights were in place to prevent vehicles using the road from Les Quennevais to the Airport when planes were being moved to or from the hangar used by B.E.A..

The runway was lengthened several times over the years, reaching its current length of 5,560 ft (1,690 m) in 1976. It is 150 ft (46 m) wide. Additional taxiways were added several years later to improve access to the one end of the runway. Due to its restricted length, in October 2007 Thomsonfly announced the removal of some services, as it introduced the larger Boeing 737-800 to its fleet. Designated 09/27 in 1952, the runway was redesignated 08/26 in October 2014 due to a shift in the Earth's magnetic poles.

In March 2012, led by a group chief executive, the successful completion of an integration programme with Jersey Harbours saw the creation of Ports of Jersey. The States of Jersey passed a business case in early 2015, and the companies were joined on 1 October 2015.

There were approximately 47,000 aircraft movements and 1,600,000 passengers at the airport during 2016.

== Terminal ==
The 1937 terminal was designed with a control tower between the arrivals and departures areas. The terminal was extended in 1976. A new departures terminal adjoining the existing terminal was opened in 1997. A new air traffic control tower was completed and opened in late 2010, and all major airport operations have been transferred to these new buildings.

Work was intended to begin late 2011 to demolish the original airport building, constructed in 1937 and which contains large quantities of asbestos but work was never undertaken, as the building was nominated as a protected historical building. On 17 March 2014 it was determined that the old terminal building would have to be demolished on grounds of aviation safety, but this was later reconsidered, and in 2021 it was confirmed that the building would not be demolished.

== Airlines and destinations ==
The following airlines operate regular scheduled and charter flights to and from Jersey:

Airlines	Destinations
Aer Lingus	Seasonal: Dublin
Air Dolomiti	Seasonal: Munich
Alsie Express	Sønderborg
Aurigny	Guernsey; Seasonal: Grenoble (begins 19 December 2026); Seasonal Charter: Teesside
British Airways	London–Gatwick, London–Heathrow; Seasonal charter: Faro, Málaga, Olbia (begins 22 May 2027), Palma de Mallorca
easyJet	Birmingham, Glasgow, Liverpool, London–Gatwick, London–Luton, Manchester; Seasonal: Belfast–International, Edinburgh, London–Southend
Eurowings	Seasonal: Düsseldorf
Finist'air	Seasonal: Alderney, Brest
Jet2.com	Seasonal: Birmingham (begins 2 May 2027), Bristol (begins 14 May 2027), East Midlands, Leeds/Bradford, Manchester (begins 1 May 2027), Newcastle upon Tyne
KLM	Seasonal: Amsterdam
Loganair	Bristol, Exeter, Southampton; Seasonal: Bordeaux, East Midlands, Norwich, Paris–Charles de Gaulle
Lufthansa	Seasonal: Munich

== General aviation ==
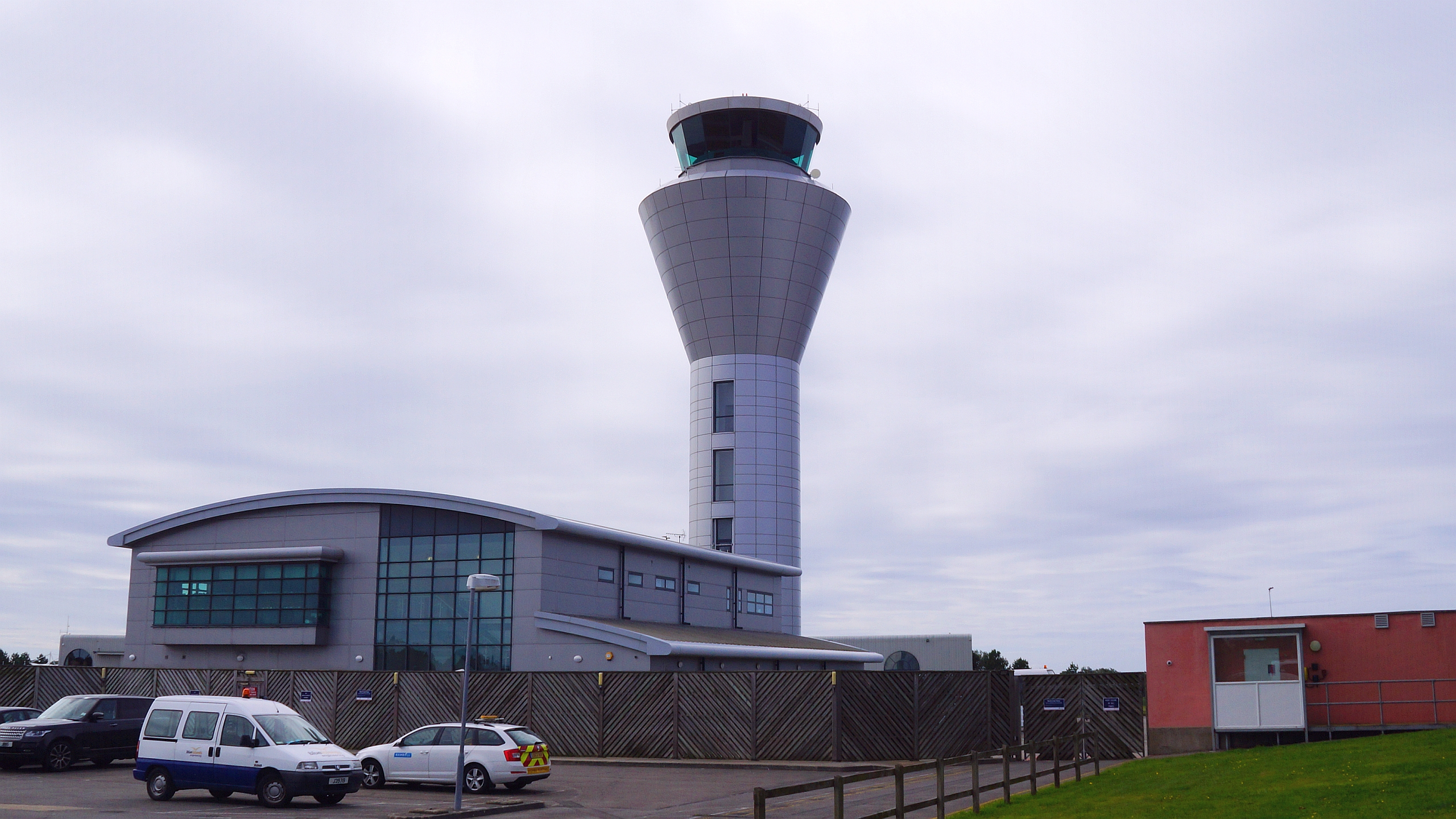
Tower buildings

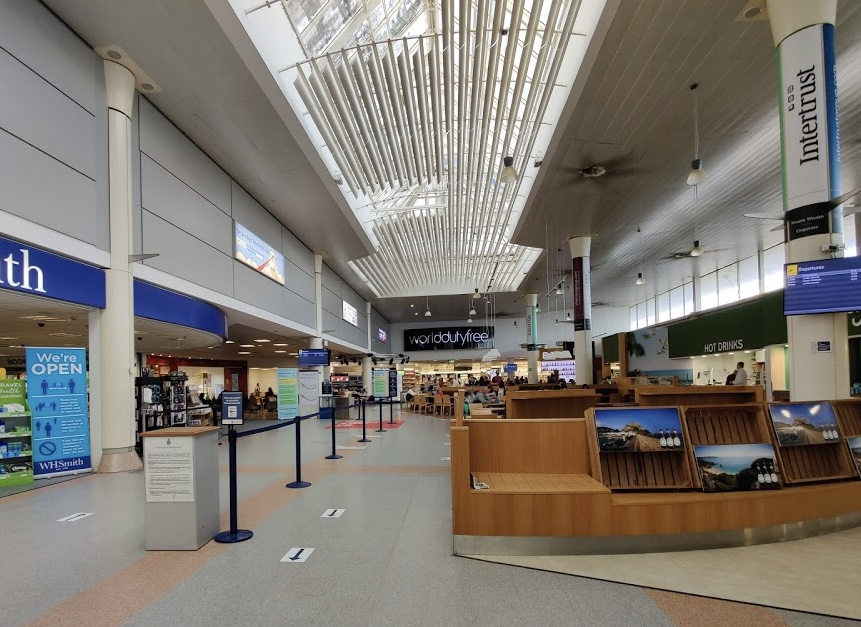
Old Terminal interior

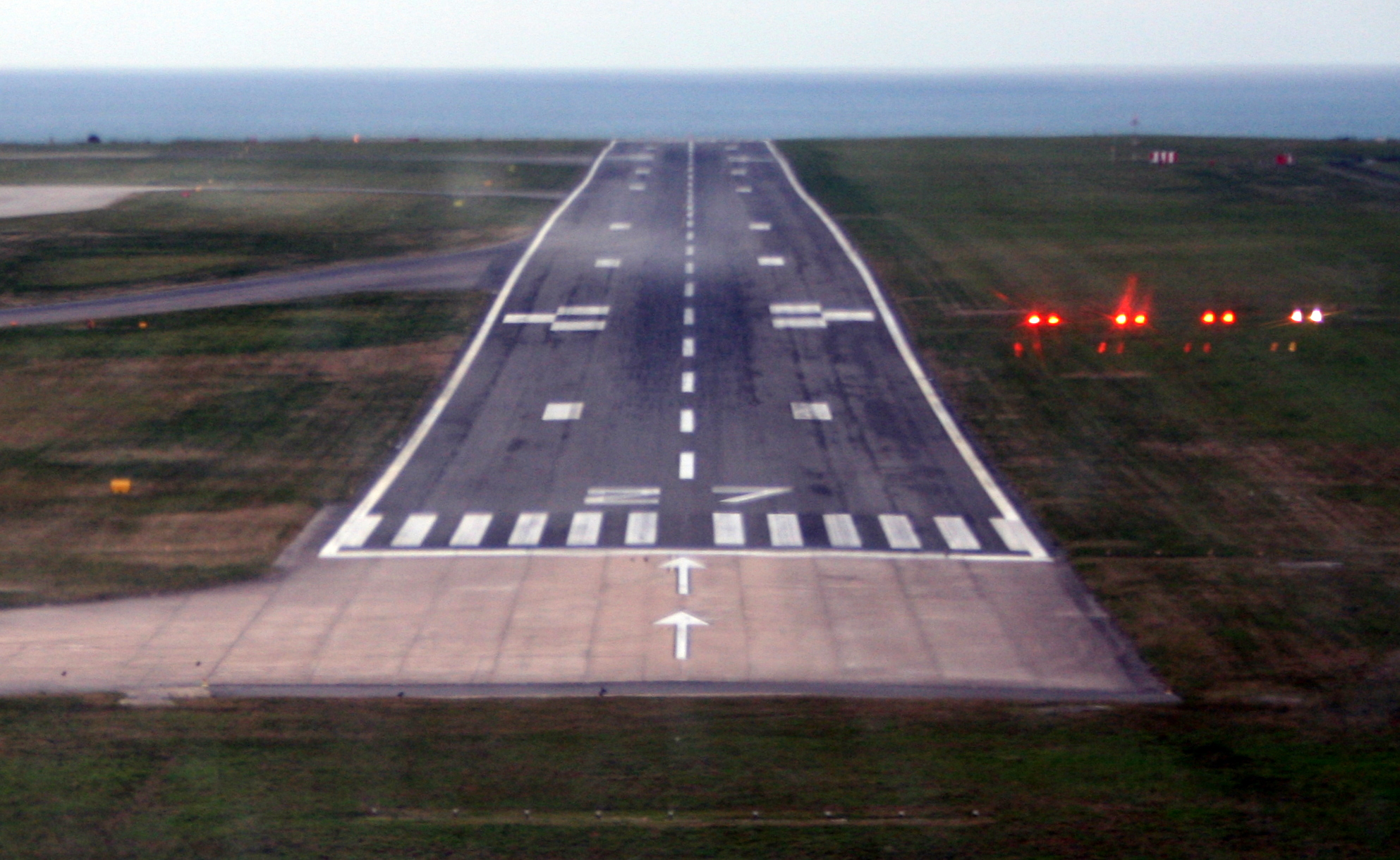
View of the runway

Apart from scheduled airline services, Jersey Airport accommodates a thriving general aviation population, including the Jersey Aero Club. It is also home to the Jersey International Air Display in September each year. Both Isle-Fly and Gama Aviation are based at Jersey Airport and offer worldwide private charter flights.

== Statistics ==
Busiest routes to and from Jersey (2024)
Rank	Airport	Total passengers	Change 2023 / 24	Airline(s)
1	London–Gatwick	381,673	▲11.4%	easyJet
2	London–Heathrow	335,045	▼0.18%	British Airways
3	Liverpool	118,835	▲0.14%	easyJet
4	London–Luton	101,937	▲0.6%	easyJet
5	Manchester	91,717	▲4.3%	easyJet
6	Southampton	89,523	▼10.4%	Blue Islands
7	Guernsey	64,830	▼16.1%	Blue Islands
8	Glasgow	53,371	▲4.6%	easyJet
9	Birmingham	37,790	▲13.4%	Blue Islands, Jet2.com
10	Bristol	31,185	▼12.7%	Blue Islands

== Ground transport ==
=== Road ===
There are long and short-stay car parks located at the airport, and free parking areas for bicycles and motorcycles. There are also many Car Hire companies, with desks located in the Arrivals Hall.

The airport connects to the road network via a roundabout onto L'Avenue de la Reine Elizabeth II and L'Avenue de la Commune.

=== Public transport ===
There is a public taxi rank, and bus stop directly outside the arrivals hall. LibertyBus route 15 is the main service between the Airport and the main bus station, Liberation Station in St Helier; it runs every 15 minutes (20 on Sundays). Additionally, hourly route 9 between St Helier and La Grève de Lecq calls at the airport, as does seasonal route 22 between St Helier and l'Etacq, which is also hourly.

== Accidents and incidents ==
- 1938 Jersey Airport disaster
