= Guernsey Airport =

Airport on the island of Guernsey

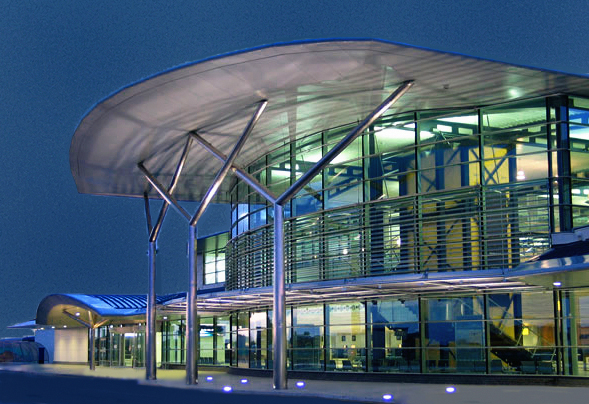
- IATA: GCI; ICAO: EGJB

Summary
- Airport type: Public
- Operator: States of Guernsey
- Serves: Guernsey
- Location: Forest, Guernsey
- Hub for: Aurigny
- Elevation AMSL: 336 ft (102 m)
- Coordinates: 49°26′05″N 002°36′07″W
- Website: www.airport.gg

Map
- Location in the Channel Islands Location relative to France and Great Britain

Runways
Direction	Length		Surface
Direction	m	ft	Surface
09/27	1,463	4,800	Asphalt

Statistics (2022)
- Passengers: 654,446
- Passenger change 21-22: ▲161%
- Aircraft movements: 16,127
- Movements change 21-22: ▲72%
- Sources: UK AIP at NATS; Statistics from the UK Civil Aviation Authority

Guernsey Airport (IATA: GCI, ICAO: EGJB) is an international airport on the island of Guernsey and the largest airport in the Bailiwick of Guernsey. It is located in the Forest, a parish in Guernsey, 2.5 nautical miles (4.6 km; 2.9 mi) southwest of St. Peter Port and features mostly flights to Great Britain and some other European destinations.

== History ==
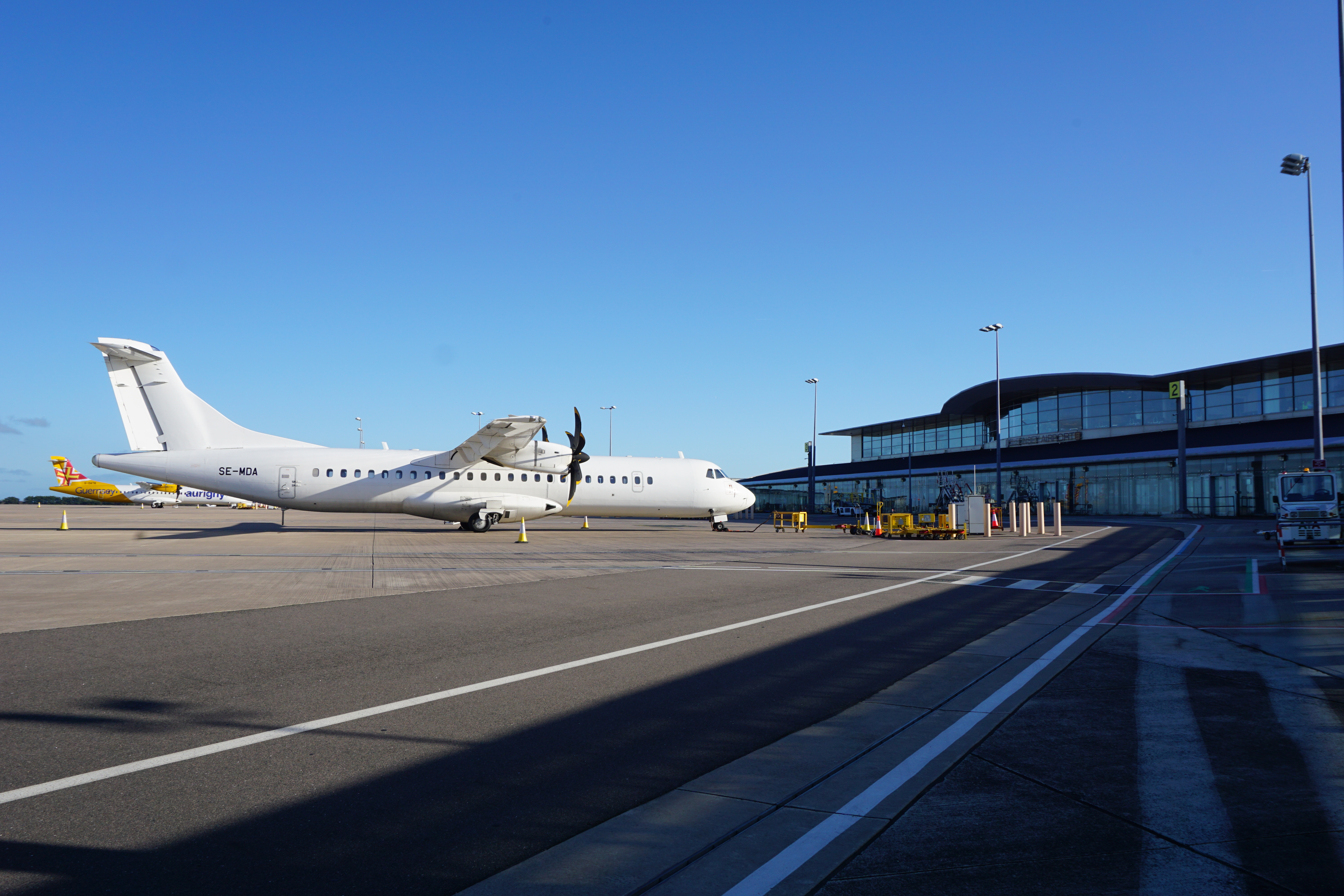
Apron view

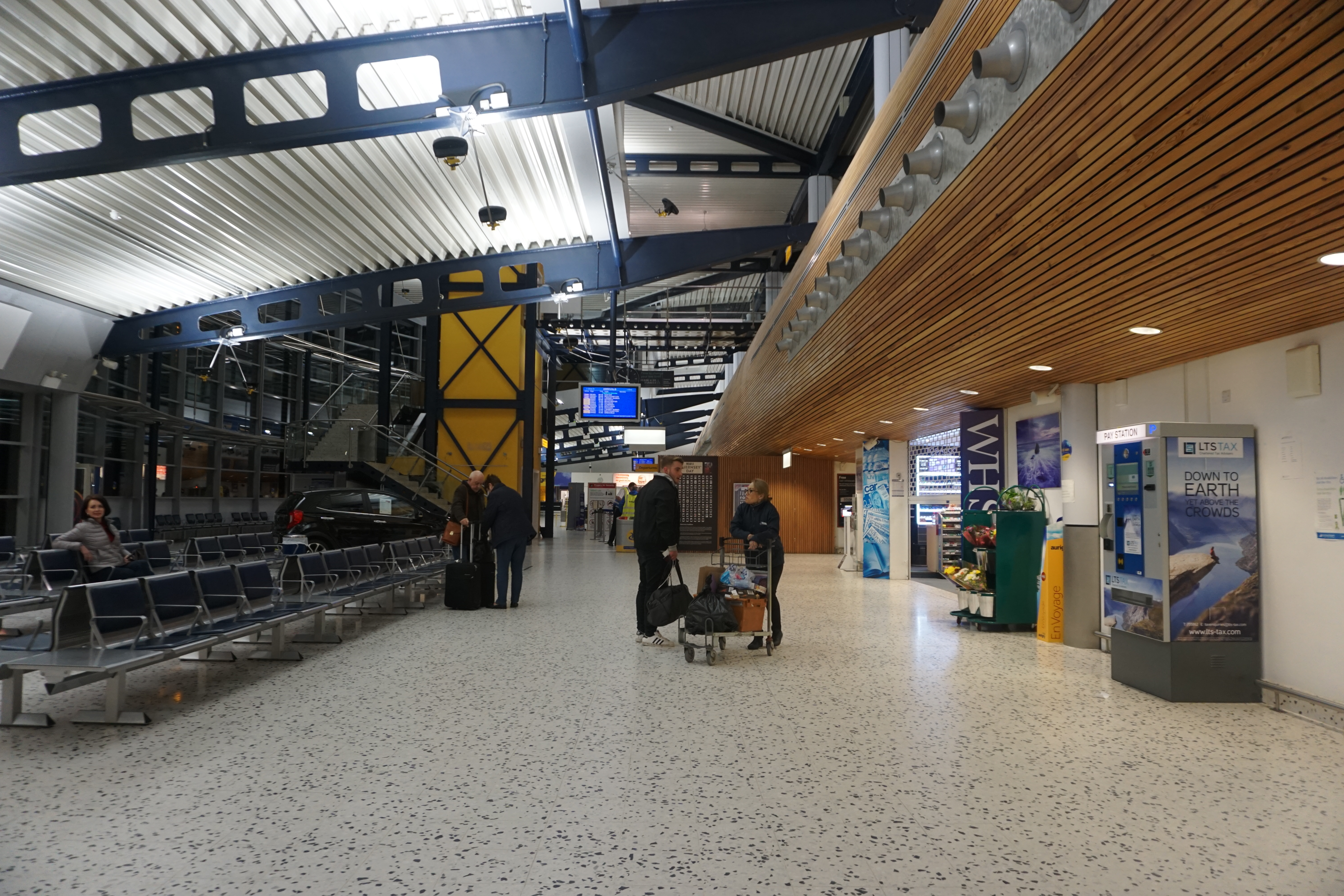
Terminal interior

The airport was officially opened on 5 May 1939. However, regular air services only commenced in October 1946. By 1948, BEA were operating a daily service to Southampton using Douglas DC-3 aircraft. From 1951, Jersey Airlines flew BEA associate scheduled services to Southampton at weekends using Rapide eight-seat biplane airliners.

In 1960 there were four grass runways, with lengths ranging from 2,040 ft (622 m) to 3,060 ft (933 m). 1960 also saw the construction of a new tarmac runway of 4,800 ft (1,463 m). In early 2000s alongside the work on the new terminal, the States of Guernsey Commerce and Employment department claimed an extension was necessary to allow the use of larger aircraft such as the Boeing 737 Classic or Airbus A320 family for trans-European flights. In 2012, a set of four two-day closures under the Airport 2040 programme allowed contractors for the States of Guernsey to resurface the existing runway, extend runway end safety areas and also reconstruct parts of the concrete apron areas. Taxiways which connect the aprons to the runway were also resurfaced and realigned, whilst a new drainage system was implemented. New airfield ground lighting and navigational aids were also installed.

Aurigny has its head office on the airport property. At one time the Channel Islands subsidiary of British United Airways had its head office on the airport property.

== Facilities ==
=== Terminal ===
Work started on a new terminal building in 2002, which became operational on 19 April 2004. The old terminal was demolished in May 2004 to make space for additional aircraft stands and a passenger walkway from the new terminal. The new terminal was designed to be able to handle about 1.25 million passengers per year. In 2013, 886,396 passengers used the airport, with 49,403 aircraft movements.

Ground handling is provided by Aurigny Aviation Services for Aurigny and British Airways. While ASG (Aircraft Servicing Guernsey) and Aiglle handle business and general aviation.

=== Runway ===
There is a single runway, designated 09/27. Runway 09 is the eastbound take-off runway and runway 27 the westbound. The landing distance available LDA in both directions 09/27 is 1463m. The take-off runway available TORA on runway 09 is 1463m. However, on runway 27 only, the take-off runway available TORA is 1583m.

During the first decade of this century, two airlines competed on the most heavily used route from Guernsey, that to London Gatwick. During this period, Aurigny operated ATR 72 turboprop aircraft (72 seats) and Flybe operated BAe 146 jet aircraft (70 to 128 passengers depending on variant). When in 2008 Flybe disposed of their BAe 146 fleet, they initially replaced them with Embraer E195 jet aircraft which could not at that time operate into Guernsey because of the then-low strength of the runway. They therefore elected to operate the smaller Bombardier Dash 8 aircraft. Business leaders and deputies (elected members of the island parliament, the States of Guernsey) argued for and against an extension of the runway from its current length of 1463 m (4,800 ft). Following several years of debate it was announced on 2 October 2009 that Guernsey's airport runway and apron would be extensively rebuilt at a then-estimated cost of £81 million. Although Guernsey is largely autonomous, it has to obey the United Kingdom Civil Aviation Authority regulations. The CAA insisted that extended runway end safety areas (RESAs) be introduced and that the then-existing hump in the runway be removed. The physical runway length was therefore to be increased by 120m at the western end. However, this extension is designated as an RESA. The significance of having only a 1463m runway is that even relatively small commercial jet aircraft in the Airbus A320 family or Boeing 737 Classic families cannot operate from Guernsey at maximum take-off weight; more recent and larger Boeing 737 Next Generation aircraft cannot effectively operate from Guernsey at all.

Sufficient progress on the rebuilding works had taken place to enable Flybe to introduce an Embraer E175 jet (88 seats) on their then-existing Gatwick service from 31 March 2013. However, Flybe then decided to dispose of their landing slots at London Gatwick and these were sold to EasyJet. EasyJet made a decision not to operate their Airbus A319 aircraft into Guernsey, leaving a reduction of four rotations per day between Guernsey and Gatwick.

The runway and apron rebuilding operations were completed during 2014. The States-owned Aurigny ordered an Embraer E195 which entered service during 2014; this 122-seat aircraft operates four rotations each day between Guernsey and Gatwick and these are supplemented by up to two ATR 72 rotations. By this means, the loss of passenger capacity between Guernsey and Gatwick occasioned by the Flybe withdrawal has been much reduced.

A growing number of proponents continue to argue that the runway should be extended to 1700m to permit more profitable operation of the Airbus A320 family or Boeing 737 Classic family aircraft, as in the neighboring island of Jersey. This would provide a wider range of flights in and out of the island increasing the island's economy and number of visitors each year.

== Airlines and destinations ==
The following airlines operate at regular, scheduled and charter services to and from Guernsey:

Airlines	Destinations
airBaltic	Seasonal charter: Gran Canaria
Aurigny	Alderney, Birmingham, Bristol, Edinburgh, Exeter, Jersey, London–City, London–Gatwick, Manchester, Paris–Charles de Gaulle, Southampton; Seasonal: Dublin, Grenoble; Seasonal charter: Teesside
British Airways	London–Heathrow; Seasonal charter: Faro, Málaga, Palma de Mallorca

== General aviation ==
The airport currently runs two liaison groups: one for commercial airport users and one for airport neighbours. A large number of single- and twin-engined light and business aircraft are based at the airport. These, and numerous visiting general aviation aircraft, are serviced by aviation engineering firms located in several hangars located at the southwest and southeast portions of the airport.

== Statistics ==
Busiest routes to and from Guernsey (2025)
Rank	Airport	Total passengers	Change 2024 / 25
1	London Gatwick	259,164	▲2.0%
2	Southampton	90,185	▼4.0%
3	Manchester	67,173	▲10.0%
4	Jersey	66,123	▲3.0%
5	London City	51,482	▲16.0%
6	Birmingham	35,879	▲8.0%
7	Alderney	29,573	▼4.0%
8	Bristol	28,117	▲5.0%
9	Exeter	16,488	▲9.0%
10	Paris–Charles de Gaulle	9,772	▲29.0%

== Ground transport ==
=== Road ===
The airport connects to the road network via a filter in turn junction onto Rue des Landes.

A long and short-stay car park, and overflow car park are located at the airport, with free bike parking located outside the main terminal and motorcycle parking in the overflow car park. Hire cars are also available at the airport, with desks located in arrivals.

A taxi rank is located directly outside the terminal building.

=== Bus ===
Buses.gg run direct services between the airport and Saint Peter Port, with several other routes serving the airport leading to destinations elsewhere across the island.

== Environment ==
In 2002, an overturned firetruck discharged PFOS fire retardant onto the airport apron and surrounding soil. PFOS was added to Annex B of the Stockholm Convention on Persistent Organic Pollutants in May 2009 and has been shown to cause chronic kidney disease amongst people and animals exposed to larger quantities. Traces of spilt PFOS later entered the island's water supply although quantities were not high enough to make it unsafe to drink. Because the airport is at the highest point in the island the accident highlighted the vulnerability of the water supply to airport effluence and other water pollutants. Aerodrome works have subsequently involved environmental engineering projects to better contain and divert contaminated effluence away from the water supply. As part of the Airport 2040 development, a new drainage system is being installed and this will allow airport effluence to be contained in a manner which does not affect water supplies in the future.

As of 2014 PFOS-contaminated soil was contained in a bund on the airport premises. Both this soil and soil polluted when containing fire from a F-27 G-CHNL crash was going to be moved in the future. The soil was removed in 2015. A legal claim of £27m against 3M over PFOS in the High Court failed in 2016 when ruled out of time.

== Accidents and incidents ==
- On 7 December 1997 an F-27 (registration: G-BNCY) operated by AirUK arriving from Southampton overshot the runway while landing in high cross-winds. The Fokker aircraft aquaplaned on standing water, left the runway end and slid on the wet grass. The aircraft nosed into the cross wind, ending up some 100 m (330 ft) off the centre line in a field to the south of the runway. There were no fatalities among the 50 passengers and 4 crew members, although the aircraft was damaged beyond repair and subsequently written off.
- On 12 January 1999 another F-27 (registration: G-CHNL) operating a cargo flight for Channel Express arriving from Luton crashed short of runway 27 after deploying full flap on approach. As the flap deployed, the cargo moved aft and this broke the aeroplane's mass and balance limits. The flight crew initiated a go-around, which exacerbated the problem by raising the gear and applying power. The aeroplane pitched up uncontrollably and stalled, which resulted in it impacting the conservatory of a house under the flight path. No one on the ground was injured; however, both flight crew were killed by the resulting fire which engulfed the aircraft. The investigation concluded the aeroplane was not loaded in accordance with the loadsheet.
- On 23 April 2024 a De Havilland Canada Dash 8 (registration: 9H-LWB) on wet-lease to Aurigny from Luxwing arriving from London Gatwick overshot runway 27 when landing. None of the 63 passengers and 4 crew were injured, disembarking the aircraft on the grass and being transported back to the terminal via bus; the aircraft itself was seemingly undamaged. The aerodrome was closed for two hours while crews attended to the aircraft, before being reopened for the later services, which had been delayed, to arrive. An investigation into the cause of the incident is being conducted.
- On 23 May 2024 a Dornier 228 NG (registration: G-ETAC) operated by Aurigny from Alderney arriving into Guernsey suffered a hydraulic failure shortly after landing. This resulted in the aerodrome closing for roughly 40 minutes. None of the 17 passengers or crew were injured.

== See also ==
- Transport in Guernsey
- Guernsey
