= Blue Islands =

Airline of the Channel Islands

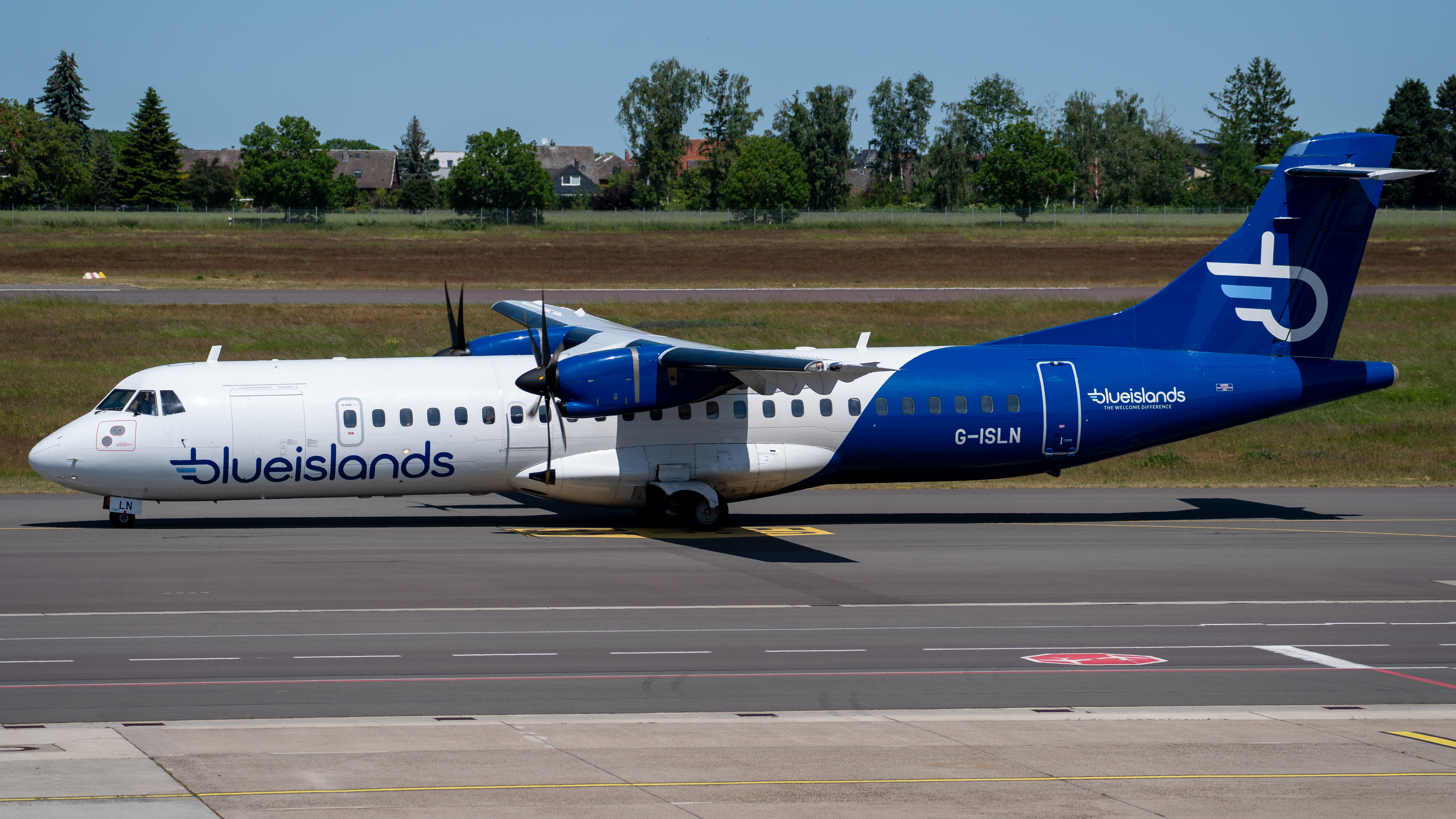
- ATR-72-500
IATA	ICAO	Call sign
SI	BCI	BLUE ISLAND
- Founded: 1999 (as Le Cocq's Airlink); 2003 (as Rockhopper); 2006 (as Blue Islands)
- Ceased operations: 14 November 2025
- Operating bases: Guernsey; Jersey
- Frequent-flyer program: Blue Skies Club
- Fleet size: 5
- Headquarters: Forest, Guernsey
- Key people: Rob Veron (Chief Executive)
- Website: blueislands.com

Blue Islands Ltd. was a regional airline of the Channel Islands. Its head office was in Forest, Guernsey, and its registered office in Saint Anne, Alderney. It operated scheduled services from and within the Channel Islands to the United Kingdom and the rest of Europe. Its main bases of operation were Guernsey Airport and Jersey Airport.

Blue Islands flights operated under the Flybe brand from June 2016 until Flybe was placed into administration on 5 March 2020. Blue Islands suspended trading and cancelled all flights on 14 November 2025, and was placed into liquidation a few days later.

The headquarters were at Healthspan House, The Grange, St. Peter Port, Guernsey. The airline was wholly owned by the Healthspan Group.

== History ==
=== Beginnings ===
The airline was formally established in 2001 (but had been operating since 1999 as a small operation) by Le Cocq's Stores in Alderney and was initially known as Le Cocq's Airlink. It started operations carrying perishable goods from Bournemouth in the south of England to the island of Alderney. Scheduled services were added on the same route on 28 January 2002. The name Rockhopper was adopted on 29 August 2003. In 2004, ownership changed to Healthspan Leisure, and in 2005, Jetstream aircraft were added to the fleet. The company moved its main operating base from Alderney to Jersey in January 2006. The company changed the corporate name from Rockhopper, whose call sign had been "Blue Island", to Blue Islands on 14 February 2006. This move coincided with the delivery of the first of its new fleet of 19-seater BAe Jetstream 31 aircraft and a new air link with the Isle of Man.

=== Blue Islands, a full regional airline ===
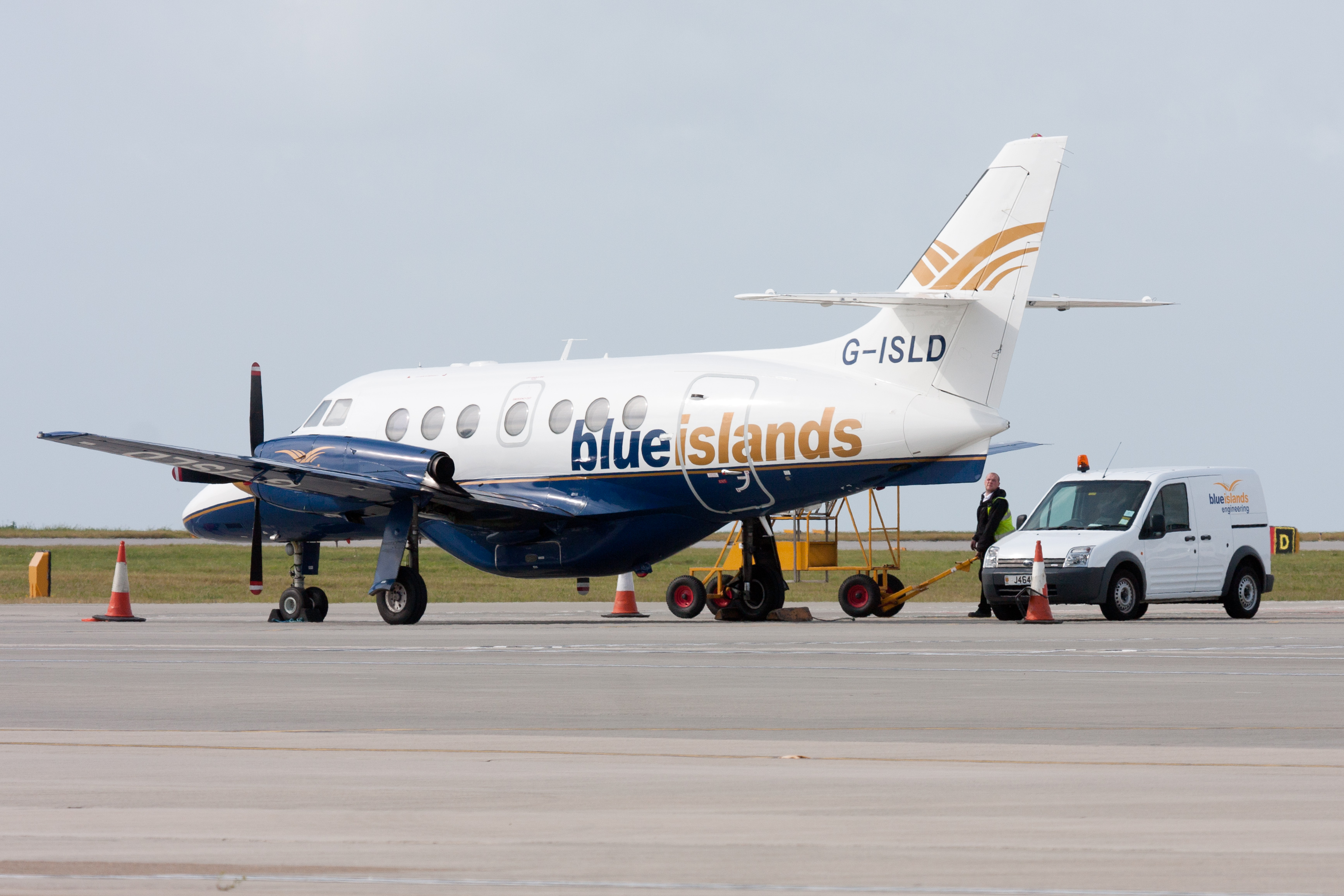
BAe Jetstream 31

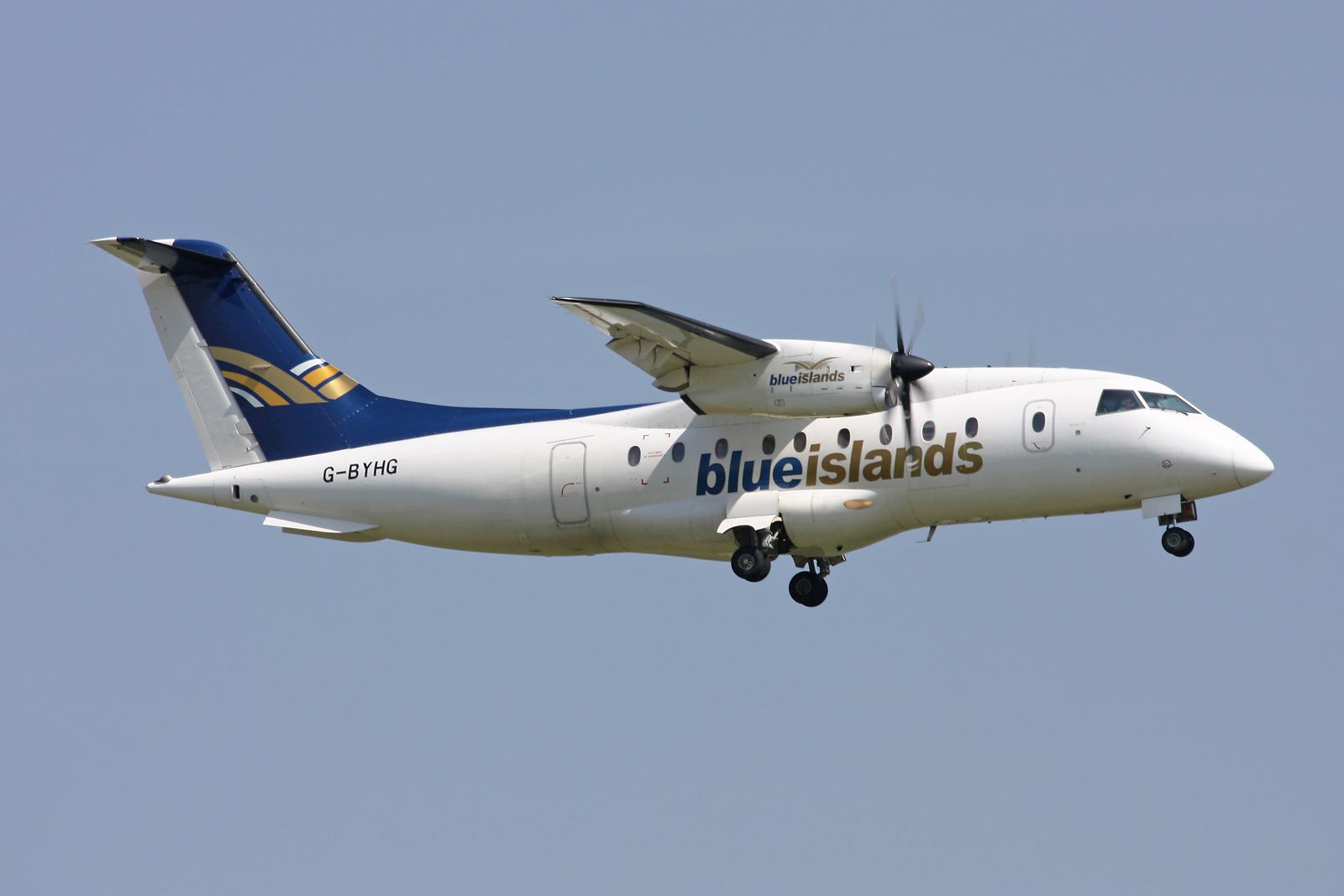
Dornier 328

The deployment of the BAe Jetstream aircraft on some Guernsey-Jersey services meant Blue Islands gained a majority share of the market from its competitor (according to Airliner World magazine), helped by the introduction of an hourly shuttle service between Guernsey and Jersey known as Blue Shuttle. In December 2007, Blue Islands' share of the inter-island market was estimated to be over 50%, and in December 2009 its market share had risen to 68%. Blue Islands went on to launch new routes from the Channel Islands to Beauvais–Tillé (halted in July 2008), Southampton, Geneva and Zurich. A Dornier 328-110 (leased from ScotAirways) was added to the fleet in 2007. However, by late 2010, its market share on the Guernsey-Jersey route had fallen to below 50% and its main competitor Aurigny was regaining much ground in the Channel Islands market.

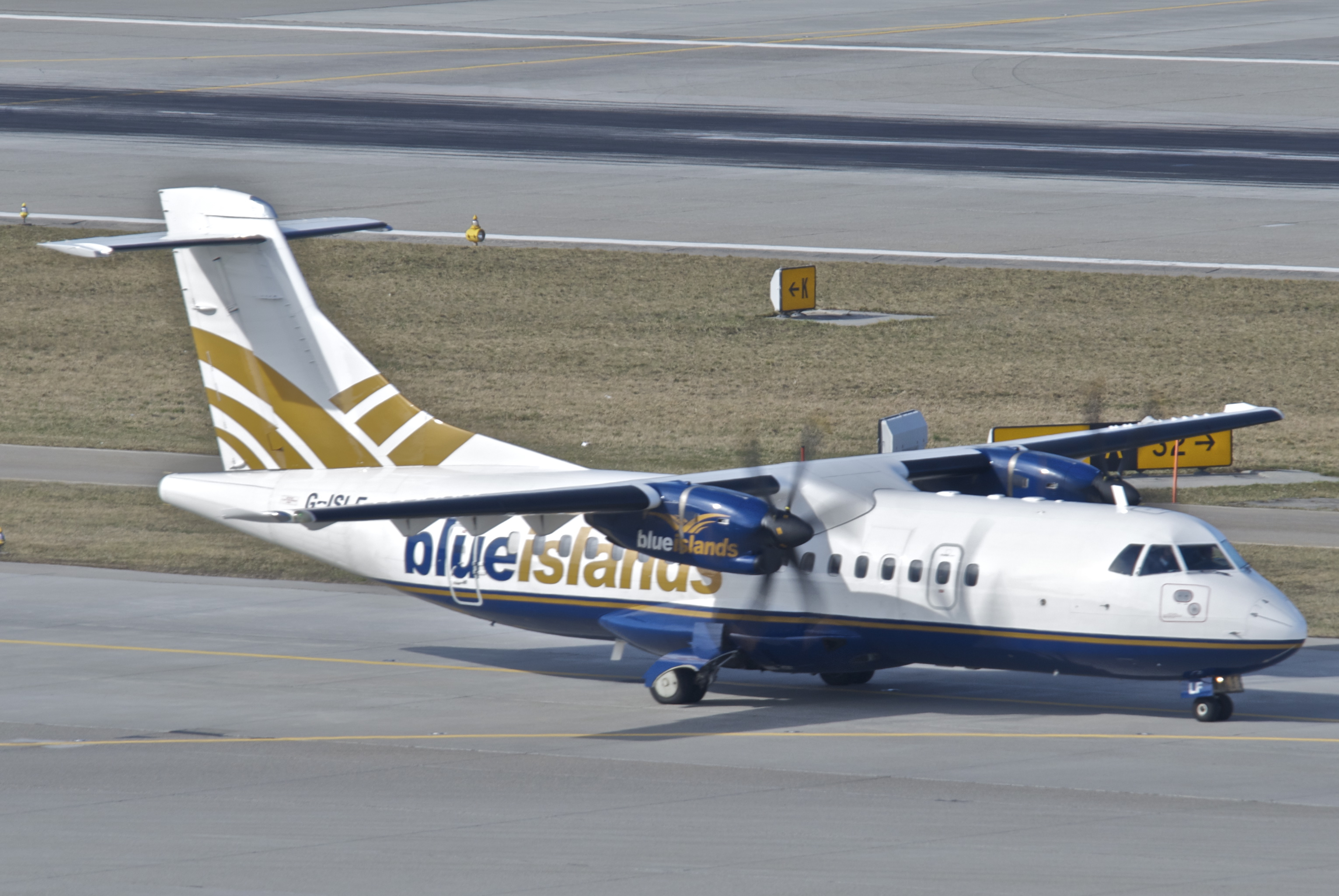
ATR 42-320

In 2010, the airline added an ATR 42-320 to its fleet. It emerged in July 2010 that Blue Islands had launched a bid with the States of Guernsey to buy its competitor, Aurigny. This caused much controversy in the Channel Islands, and a Facebook page in opposition to the proposed buy-out gained nearly 600 members. Those in favour of the deal claimed that it did not make sense for the two airlines to continue to accumulate such large losses whilst operating in competition with each other. The failure of the deal was announced on 14 September 2010, amidst doubts over the security of Guernsey's slots at Gatwick Airport.

A number of changes took place in 2011. Rob Veron was appointed as managing director and the Britten-Norman Trislander fleet was repainted and refitted for a planned new hub at Alderney with routes to Southampton and Cherbourg. However, the application was denied because the start date was within six months of the application date. Blue Islands announced that a full withdrawal from Alderney would take place on 9 May 2011 (coincidentally Liberation Day), after 11 years of services. In March 2011, it announced a twice-daily weekday route (with a once-daily flight on Sundays) from Jersey to London City Airport, and in April a route to Bristol was announced. Daily services between Jersey and Manchester Airport were announced in September, along with the restoration of a thrice-weekly service to Bournemouth Airport, in competition with the airline's own regular services to Southampton, as well as those of Flybe. In November, the planned retirement of the Trislander fleet was made public, with the last day of operations to be 4 December. This was because they were 'too noisy, old and small'.

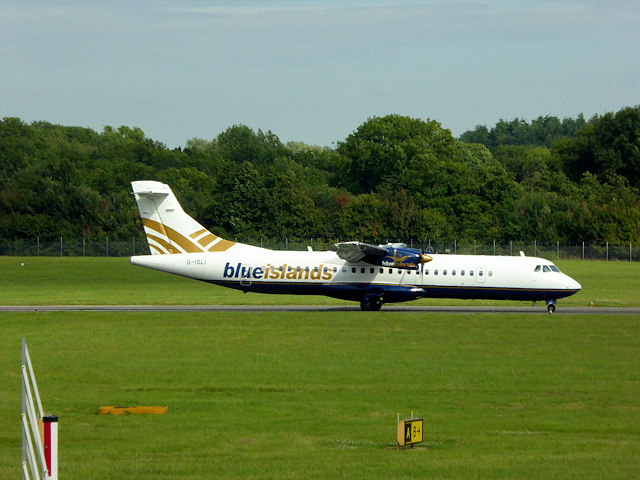
ATR 72-500

On 16 June 2012, a Blue Islands ATR 42-300 registered G-DRFC operating from Guernsey to Jersey suffered a collapse of the left main landing gear while exiting the runway; none of the 43 people on board were injured in the accident. Blue Islands applied to the States of Guernsey for a license to operate a twice-daily Guernsey-Bristol service in competition with Aurigny. A licence hearing was due to take place in January 2013 regarding the application. The application was withdrawn as Blue Islands wished to concentrate on building the Jersey base.

To further supplement its fleet, Blue Islands purchased an ATR 42-320 from Air Atlantique Assistance, entering service on 23 August 2012. Blue Islands announced winter service from Jersey to Chambéry in August 2012, and in October it announced services to Amsterdam and Paris, which would start in February 2013. A further ATR 42-320, registered G-ISLH, entered service in July 2013 and in December 2013 an ATR 72-500, registered G-ISLI, was damp leased from Nordic Aviation Capital to provide extra capacity on the Guernsey to Southampton service. The latter aircraft type was replacing the ATR 42 fleet. A new ATR 72-500 arrived in October 2016, to replace an ATR 42-320 which was retired. Another ATR 42-320 was sold in 2017, and was replaced by another ATR 72. In October 2018, Blue Islands took delivery a fourth ATR 72-500. This aircraft was the first to be delivered during the Flybe franchise without Flybe colours; it sported a modified version of Blue Islands' original livery with small titles, and a white fuselage with blue engines. The airline's last ATR 42 was retired in 2022, following the delivery of another ATR 72.

=== Franchise deal with Flybe ===
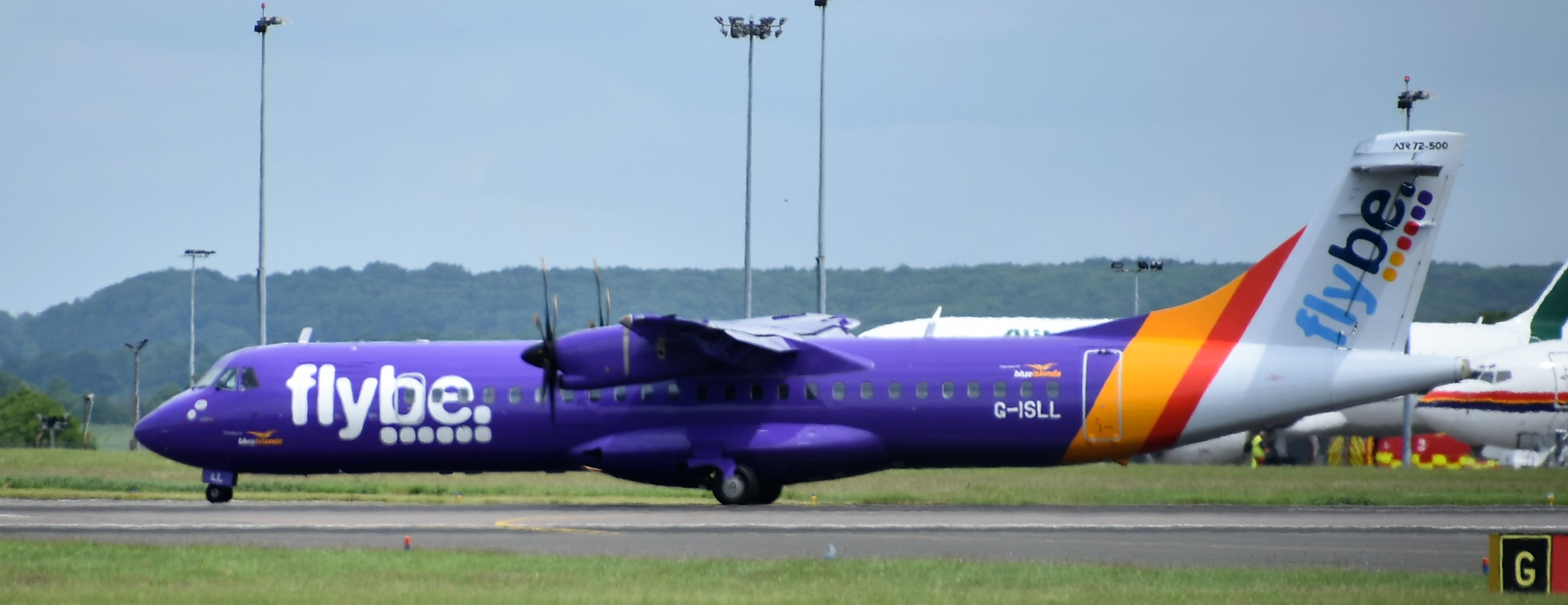
An ATR 72 in Flybe livery

In January 2016, Blue Islands revealed their franchise deal with Flybe (British European Airways brand), which allowed Blue Islands to operate their flights in Flybe livery aircraft and these flights began 6 June 2016. In July 2016, Blue Islands was heavily criticized by the States of Jersey and Guernsey after several aircraft were found to have technical problems, causing high numbers of delays and cancellations. This caused weeks of disruption to Blue Islands' services and meetings with States officials to put measures into place to prevent events like this from occurring again. CICRA (the Channel Islands competition watchdog) wrote a letter to the airline, asking them to address the measures and the benefits of the franchise deal with Flybe. In December 2016, CICRA accused Blue Islands of contravening and potentially breaking the Channel Islands' competition laws through the Flybe franchise deal. The watchdog said that the deal "...may have restricted competitive choices, including schedules and which routes the competitors can fly." They said that the airline's response to its letter was not satisfactory and had started a full investigation into the airline and the franchise.

=== Post-Flybe relaunch ===
During 2017 and 2018, a summer seasonal service between Guernsey and Cardiff was operated. In 2019, new routes from Jersey to Newquay and from Guernsey to Liverpool and London Southend were launched, but were axed the following year.

On 5 March 2020, Flybe ceased operations and entered administration, forcing Blue Islands to resume flying on its own and reactivate its own reservation system. Immediately following Flybe's demise, Blue Islands announced it would begin flying to Birmingham and Exeter from Jersey, two former Flybe routes. However, shortly after these routes initially commenced, the airline was forced to ground all aircraft following Guernsey and Jersey, as well as the United Kingdom, entering lockdown due to the COVID-19 pandemic. Following the suspension of service, the Government of Jersey announced it would subsidize the airline to operate 'essential flights' from Jersey to Southampton, and later to London Gatwick, in order to transport key workers and medical patients requiring off-island care.

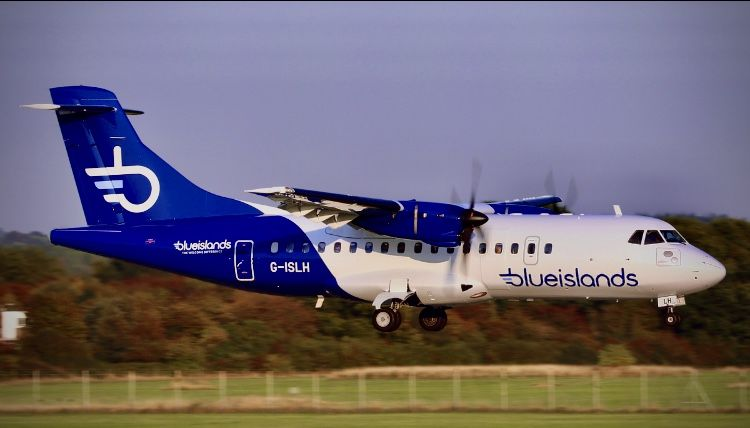
An ATR 4, wearing the carrier's last livery.

In June 2020, the Government of Jersey announced it would provide a £10 million loan to the airline in order to facilitiate the return of its regularly scheduled operations. Following this, the company agreed to a 10-year contract with Jersey Airport to maintain its Jersey aircraft and crew base. In August, Blue Islands officially announced it would relaunch operations, alongside the unveiling of a new livery. As part of the relaunch, airline resumed service from Jersey to Birmingham, Bristol, East Midlands, Exeter, Guernsey and Southampton, as well as from Guernsey to Southampton. Jersey to London City service, which was operated before the pandemic, would not resume. The airline also announced intentions to expand its fleet and take over additional routes that were lost following Flybe's closure. Shortly after, Blue Islands announced it would open a base in Exeter, marking the first time the airline would base aircraft outside of the Channel Islands, and launch twice-daily weekday flights between Exeter and Manchester. It was then announced that the company would open a base in Southampton, and launch flights from Southampton to Dublin and Manchester. The latter routes were to be in direct competition with Eastern Airways, who had also announced intentions to open a Southampton base following Flybe's collapse. Both bases were planned to open in September 2020, however this was pushed back into 2021 and eventually 2022, until in February 2022 the plans for both bases were officially scrapped.

In September 2020, Blue Islands commenced a codeshare agreement with Scottish regional airline Loganair, enabling passengers travelling on Blue Islands' Southampton network to connect onto Aberdeen (via Manchester), Edinburgh, Inverness (via Manchester), Glasgow and Newcastle, as well as from Exeter to Aberdeen and Inverness (both via Manchester). The deal would also allow Loganair to feed passengers onto Blue Islands flights to the Channel Islands from several UK airports, including Birmingham and Bristol. In November 2021, it was announced that this agreement would expand into a full commercial partnership between both Blue Islands and Loganair as well as Aurigny. Under the expanded agreement, passengers would be able to connect onto the entirety of the three airlines' networks, and earn loyalty points for each of the airlines' loyalty schemes on every flight. The partnership announcement also included a formal non-competitive pact between Aurigny and Blue Islands on routes from Guernsey, as well as a route sharing agreement on flights between Guernsey and Southampton, whereby both airlines would operate a select number of daily flights at different times. As of December 2022 however, the partnership had not fully commenced.

In 2021, Blue Islands resumed scheduled service to Europe with the addition of flights to both Dublin and Rennes from Jersey. Dublin services were initially operated via Belfast City Airport due to licensing issues. Seasonal service from Jersey to Norwich also commenced in the same year. The company also expressed interest in flying to Luxembourg and resuming service to the Isle of Man, which both see demand from the financial services industries in both Jersey and Guernsey. It was later announced that service from the Isle of Man to Jersey would resume in November 2023. Service to Birmingham was suspended in October 2024, citing competition from easyJet.

Following the collapse of Eastern Airways in October 2025, it was announced that regional operator Skybus would be temporarily granted a contract to replace the Cornwall Airport Newquay to London Gatwick route. Skybus was to source the first aircraft from Blue Islands until early 2026.

=== Collapse ===
On 14 November 2025, Blue Islands suspended trading and cancelled all flights. Aurigny and Loganair announced they would run extra flights to rescue passengers stranded by Blue Islands' collapse. On 17 November, the Government of Jersey announced that Blue Islands had entered liquidation. The government also stated that the airline owed it £9.1 million, mostly from a loan during the COVID-19 pandemic.

== Destinations ==
As of November 2025, Blue Islands operated the following services:

Country	City/region	Airport	Notes	Refs
France	Paris	Paris-Charles de Gaulle	Seasonal	
Guernsey	Forest	Guernsey Airport	Base	
Ireland	Dublin	Dublin Airport	Seasonal	
Italy	Verona	Verona Villafranca Airport	Seasonal	
Jersey	Saint Peter	Jersey Airport	Base	
Netherlands	Groningen	Groningen Airport Eelde	Seasonal Charter	
Netherlands	Rotterdam	Rotterdam The Hague Airport	Seasonal Charter	
Switzerland	Zurich	Zurich Airport	Seasonal Charter	
United Kingdom
United Kingdom	Bristol	Bristol Airport		
United Kingdom	East Midlands	East Midlands Airport		
United Kingdom	Exeter	Exeter Airport		
United Kingdom	Newcastle upon Tyne	Newcastle International Airport	Seasonal	
United Kingdom	Norwich	Norwich Airport	Seasonal	
United Kingdom	Southampton	Southampton Airport		

=== Codeshare agreements ===
Blue Islands had a codeshare with Aurigny.

=== Interline agreements ===
Blue Islands had an interline agreement with Hahn Air.

== Fleet ==
=== Final fleet ===
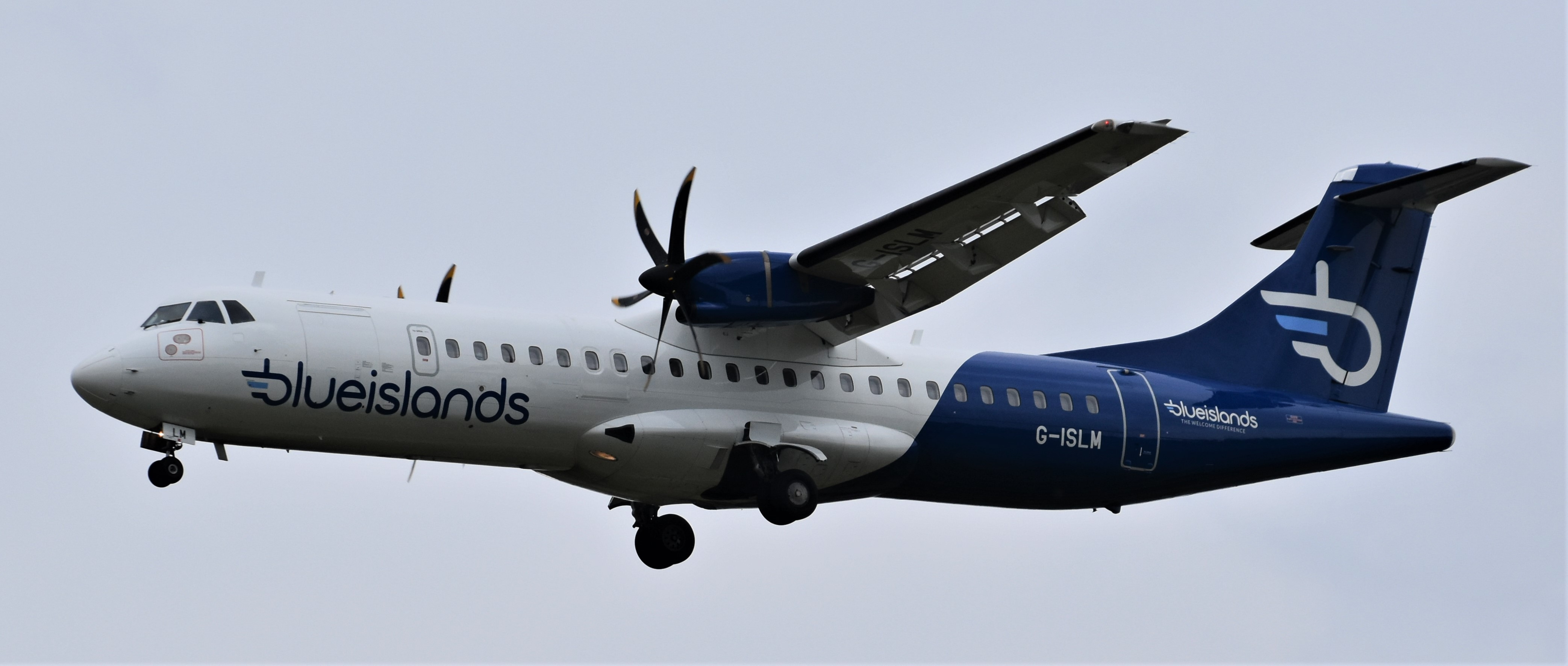
ATR 72-500

As of August 2025, Blue Islands operated the following aircraft:

Final fleet
Aircraft	In fleet	Orders	Passengers	Notes
ATR 72-500	2	—	68	
ATR 72-500	1	—	70	
ATR 72-500	1	—	72	
ATR 72-600	1	—	72	
Total	5	—		

== Incidents and accidents ==
- On 16 June 2012, an ATR 42-320 (registration G-DRFC), operating flight number SI308, suffered a collapse of the left main landing gear while taxiing after landing at Jersey Airport. The aircraft's left propeller and wing tip were damaged after striking the ground, subsequently writing off the aircraft. There were three crew operating the flight and 40 passengers traveling on board. An investigation conducted by the Air Accident Investigation Branch found that the captain was conducting line training for a pilot who had recently joined the company and a 3g acceleration spike was recorded on touchdown, higher than usual. The investigation determined that fatigue sustained in the lifecycle of the landing gear led to a crack which ultimately resulted in complete failure of the left landing gear. There were no injuries in the incident, except for four passengers injured during the evacuation.
- In November 2016, one of Blue Islands' ATR 72s was damaged by Storm Angus whilst parked at Guernsey Airport. A piece of airport equipment hit the aircraft, leaving a large dent in its fuselage. An ATR 72-200 was leased from Danish Air Transport as a backup aircraft.
