= List of busiest airports in the United Kingdom =

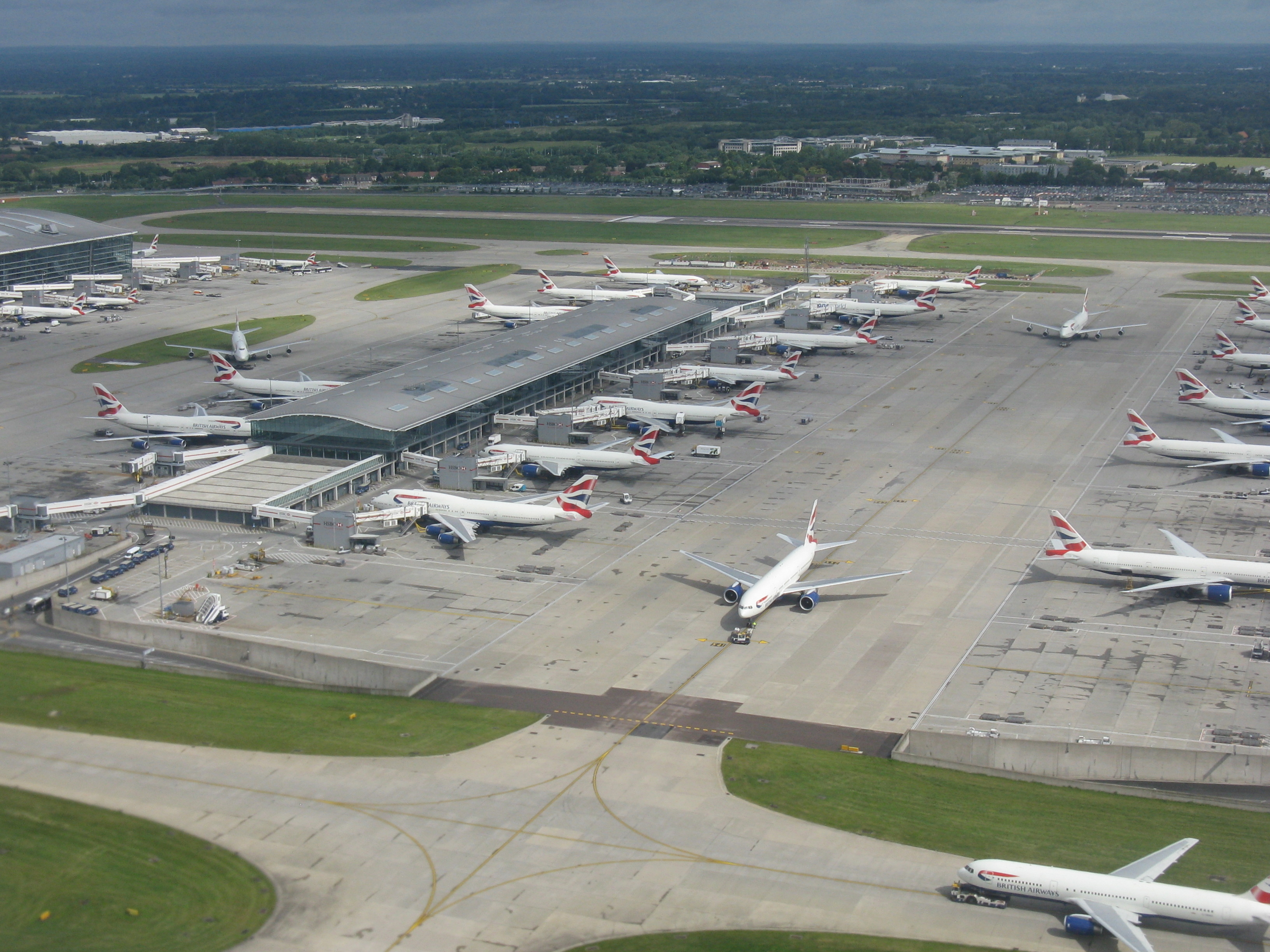
Heathrow; which handled 84 million passengers in 2024

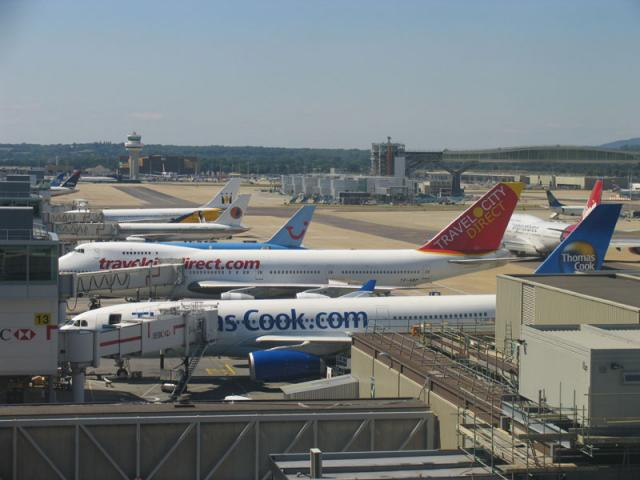
Gatwick Airport, the second busiest airport after Heathrow

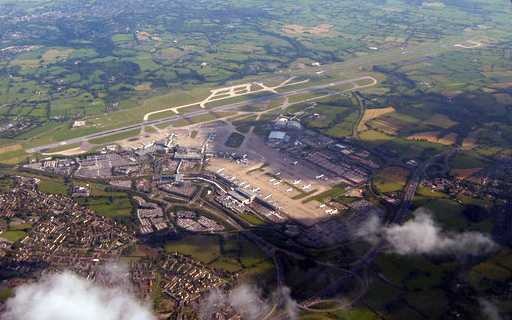
Manchester Airport, the third busiest airport in the UK and busiest of the non-London airports

This is a list of the busiest airports in the United Kingdom, Channel Islands, and Isle of Man ranked by total passenger traffic, compiled from Civil Aviation Authority data from 2006 to 2024. For some years the figures also show total aircraft movements and cargo volume handled at each airport. For a complete list of UK airports, see List of airports in the United Kingdom and the British Crown Dependencies.

The United Kingdom, an island country, is home to many of Europe's largest and busiest airports. London Heathrow, which handles over 83 million passengers annually, is the largest airport in the UK. London serves as the largest aviation hub in the world by passenger traffic, with six international airports, handling over 177 million passengers in 2024, more than any other city (List of busiest city airport systems by passenger traffic). London's second-busiest airport, London Gatwick, was until 2016 the world's busiest single-runway airport. Manchester Airport is the United Kingdom's third-busiest airport. London Stansted and London Luton are the fourth and fifth busiest airports, respectively.

The largest airport operator in the United Kingdom is Heathrow Airport Holdings (owner of Heathrow), followed by Manchester Airports Group (owner of Manchester, Stansted and East Midlands). Together with British Airways and Virgin Atlantic, they are part of the Aviation Foundation which lobby for the aviation needs of the United Kingdom.

== Statistics ==
=== 2025 data ===
The following is a list of the 40 largest UK airports by total passenger traffic in 2025, from UK CAA statistics.

Although the top ten airports remained unchanged, the most notable shift was Liverpool John Lennon Airport overtaking Newcastle International Airport to claim eleventh place. Another striking fact is the decline in passenger numbers at London Gatwick and Belfast International Airports, the second and tenth busiest UK airports respectively, despite a significant overall increase in passenger journeys, from 295 million in 2024 to 302 million in 2025.

| Rank 2025 | Airport | Total passengers | | | Aircraft movements | | |
| Rank 2025 | Airport | 2024 | 2025 | Change 2024 / 25 | 2024 | 2025 | Change 2024 / 25 |
|---|---|---|---|---|---|---|---|
| 1 | London Heathrow | 83,882,140 | 84,481,178 | 0.7% | 476,119 | 479,996 | 0.8% |
| 2 | London Gatwick | 43,249,282 | 42,775,241 | 1.1% | 265,358 | 263,113 | 0.8% |
| 3 | Manchester | 30,789,056 | 32,072,136 | 4.2% | 196,473 | 203,256 | 3.5% |
| 4 | London Stansted | 29,694,316 | 29,758,490 | 0.2% | 201,031 | 194,881 | 3.1% |
| 5 | London Luton | 16,939,902 | 17,770,247 | 4.9% | 131,962 | 134,763 | 2.1% |
| 6 | Edinburgh | 15,780,353 | 16,970,685 | 7.5% | 120,406 | 124,751 | 3.6% |
| 7 | Birmingham | 12,848,201 | 13,663,877 | 6.3% | 94,130 | 99,140 | 5.3% |
| 8 | Bristol | 10,615,864 | 10,833,730 | 2.1% | 78,595 | 78,084 | 0.6% |
| 9 | Glasgow | 8,067,685 | 8,207,395 | 1.7% | 76,916 | 80,008 | 4.0% |
| 10 | Belfast International | 6,750,440 | 6,677,021 | 1.1% | 60,480 | 58,180 | 3.8% |
| 11 | Liverpool | 5,074,266 | 5,611,423 | 10.6% | 51,715 | 53,750 | 3.9% |
| 12 | Newcastle | 5,143,412 | 5,480,401 | 6.6% | 46,836 | 48,552 | 3.7% |
| 13 | Leeds Bradford | 4,222,487 | 4,447,024 | 5.3% | 37,093 | 38,370 | 3.4% |
| 14 | East Midlands | 4,133,398 | 3,955,756 | 4.3% | 63,648 | 59,874 | 5.9% |
| 15 | London City | 3,573,250 | 3,737,888 | 4.6% | 50,956 | 50,992 | 0.1% |
| 16 | Belfast City | 2,391,124 | 2,363,781 | 1.1% | 30,302 | 28,635 | 6.3% |
| 17 | Aberdeen | 2,300,657 | 2,301,978 | 0.1% | 72,100 | 65,611 | 9.0% |
| 18 | Jersey | 1,469,946 | 1,453,675 | 1.1% | 29,540 | 30,324 | 2.7% |
| 19 | Bournemouth | 1,088,370 | 1,380,454 | 26.8% | 21,000 | 24,861 | 18.4% |
| 20 | Cardiff | 875,651 | 958,495 | 9.5% | 15,455 | 16,956 | 9.7% |
| 21 | Southampton | 852,727 | 885,266 | 3.8% | 21,369 | 20,092 | 6.0% |
| 22 | Inverness | 797,059 | 824,046 | 3.4% | 20,694 | 19,173 | 7.3% |
| 23 | London Southend | 287,758 | 719,513 | 150.0% | 27,134 | 30,728 | 13.2% |
| 24 | Guernsey | 684,554 | 692,139 | 1.1% | 29,171 | 29,972 | 2.7% |
| 25 | Glasgow Prestwick | 535,570 | 620,960 | 5.9% | 22,615 | 20,547 | 9.1% |
| 26 | Isle of Man | 639,138 | 617,085 | 3.4% | 15,511 | 16,271 | 4.9% |
| 27 | Exeter | 449,722 | 572,260 | 27.2% | 23,296 | 23,639 | 1.5% |
| 28 | Norwich | 415,099 | 446,052 | 7.5% | 30,227 | 26,493 | 12.4% |
| 29 | Newquay | 415,989 | 394,326 | 5.2% | 18,134 | 20,008 | 10.3% |
| 30 | Sumburgh | 289,724 | 282,595 | 2.5% | 17,116 | 16,167 | 5.5% |
| 31 | Teesside | 228,126 | 261,440 | 14.6% | 18,971 | 20,822 | 9.8% |
| 32 | City of Derry | 179,095 | 220,933 | 23.4% | 7,231 | 7,941 | 9.8% |
| 33 | Humberside | 150,615 | 161,171 | 7.0% | 18,280 | 16,908 | 7.5% |
| 34 | Kirkwall | 149,503 | 157,051 | 5.0% | 11,355 | 11,657 | 2.7% |
| 35 | Stornoway | 100,988 | 104,554 | 3.5% | 7,623 | 7,720 | 1.3% |
| 36 | St Mary's | 68,086 | 72,244 | 6.1% | 9,082 | 9,703 | 6.8% |
| 37 | Land's End | 49,671 | 51,588 | 3.9% | 7,500 | 9,065 | 20.9% |
| 38 | Alderney | 47,736 | 47,387 | 0.7% | 7,102 | 7,258 | 2.2% |
| 39 | Farnborough | 38,342 | 37,805 | 1.4% | 31,128 | 31,316 | 0.6% |
| 40 | Dundee | 36,071 | 33,068 | 8.3% | 4,112 | 4,254 | 3.5% |
| TOTAL | | 295,307,397 | 302,102,358 | 2.3% | 2,469,790 | 2,483,831 | 0.6% |

Source: UK CAA Airport Data 2025

=== 2024 data ===
The following is a list of the 40 largest UK airports by total passenger traffic in 2024, from UK CAA statistics.

| Rank 2024 (Note: Rank is by total passengers.) | Airport | Total passengers (Note: Total passengers includes domestic, international and transit passengers.) | | | Aircraft movements (Note: Aircraft movements includes all commercial and non-commercial takeoffs and landings. (The 2025 column was left blank as the CAA has not yet published the annual data.)) | | |
| Rank 2024 | Airport | 2023 | 2024 | Change 2023 / 24 | 2023 | 2024 | Change 2023 / 24 |
|---|---|---|---|---|---|---|---|
| 1 | London Heathrow | 79,180,434 | 83,882,140 | 5.9% | 456,600 | 476,119 | 4.3% |
| 2 | London Gatwick | 40,897,656 | 43,249,282 | 5.8% | 256,893 | 265,358 | 3.3% |
| 3 | Manchester | 28,096,783 | 30,789,056 | 9.6% | 180,246 | 196,473 | 9.0% |
| 4 | London Stansted | 27,951,291 | 29,694,316 | 6.2% | 195,438 | 201,031 | 2.9% |
| 5 | London Luton | 16,403,784 | 16,939,902 | 3.3% | 128,430 | 131,962 | 2.8% |
| 6 | Edinburgh | 14,396,794 | 15,780,353 | 9.6% | 115,076 | 120,406 | 4.6% |
| 7 | Birmingham | 11,481,365 | 12,848,201 | 11.9% | 86,584 | 94,130 | 8.7% |
| 8 | Bristol | 9,913,011 | 10,615,864 | 7.1% | 77,260 | 78,595 | 1.7% |
| 9 | Glasgow | 7,358,828 | 8,067,685 | 9.6% | 74,563 | 76,916 | 3.2% |
| 10 | Belfast International | 5,957,055 | 6,750,440 | 13.3% | 57,761 | 60,480 | 4.7% |
| 11 | Newcastle | 4,819,969 | 5,143,412 | 6.7% | 45,229 | 46,836 | 3.6% |
| 12 | Liverpool | 4,193,623 | 5,074,266 | 21.0% | 49,436 | 51,715 | 4.6% |
| 13 | Leeds Bradford | 3,989,405 | 4,222,487 | 5.8% | 36,413 | 37,093 | 1.9% |
| 14 | East Midlands | 3,932,497 | 4,133,398 | 5.1% | 66,212 | 63,648 | 3.9% |
| 15 | London City | 3,429,684 | 3,573,250 | 4.2% | 52,101 | 50,956 | 2.2% |
| 16 | Belfast City | 2,115,153 | 2,391,124 | 13.0% | 29,282 | 30,302 | 3.5% |
| 17 | Aberdeen | 2,229,918 | 2,300,657 | 3.2% | 73,442 | 72,100 | 1.8% |
| 18 | Jersey | 1,468,820 | 1,469,946 | 0.1% | 30,869 | 29,540 | 4.3% |
| 19 | Bournemouth | 950,206 | 1,088,370 | 14.5% | 20,650 | 21,000 | 1.7% |
| 20 | Cardiff | 838,529 | 875,651 | 4.4% | 15,806 | 15,455 | 2.2% |
| 21 | Southampton | 754,931 | 852,727 | 13.0% | 21,998 | 21,369 | 2.9% |
| 22 | Inverness | 802,338 | 797,059 | 0.7% | 23,842 | 20,694 | 13.2% |
| 23 | Guernsey | 694,958 | 684,554 | 1.5% | 27,872 | 29,171 | 4.7% |
| 24 | Isle of Man | 638,619 | 639,138 | 0.1% | 15,741 | 15,511 | 1.5% |
| 25 | Glasgow Prestwick | 524,880 | 535,570 | 2.0% | 24,471 | 22,615 | 7.6% |
| 26 | Exeter | 433,067 | 449,722 | 3.8% | 27,082 | 23,296 | 14.0% |
| 27 | Newquay | 408,870 | 415,989 | 1.7% | 19,384 | 18,134 | 6.4% |
| 28 | Norwich | 357,852 | 415,099 | 16.0% | 28,662 | 30,227 | 5.5% |
| 29 | Sumburgh | 259,068 | 289,724 | 11.8% | 17,426 | 17,116 | 1.8% |
| 30 | London Southend | 146,072 | 287,758 | 97.0% | 31,546 | 27,134 | 14.0% |
| 31 | Teesside | 226,557 | 228,126 | 0.7% | 21,125 | 18,971 | 10.2% |
| 32 | City of Derry | 154,486 | 179,095 | 15.9% | 7,110 | 7,231 | 1.7% |
| 33 | Humberside | 136,976 | 150,615 | 10.0% | 16,678 | 18,280 | 9.6% |
| 34 | Kirkwall | 143,093 | 149,503 | 4.5% | 11,443 | 11,355 | 0.8% |
| 35 | Stornoway | 106,237 | 100,988 | 4.9% | 7,366 | 7,623 | 3.5% |
| 36 | St Mary's | 69,404 | 68,086 | 1.9% | 8,849 | 9,082 | 2.6% |
| 37 | Land's End | 54,517 | 49,671 | 8.9% | 7,475 | 7,500 | 0.3% |
| 38 | Alderney | 49,546 | 47,736 | 3.7% | 7,237 | 7,102 | 1.9% |
| 39 | Farnborough | 38,827 | 38,342 | 1.2% | 32,622 | 31,128 | 4.6% |
| 40 | Dundee | 38,508 | 36,071 | 6.3% | 6,019 | 4,112 | 31.7% |
| TOP 40 TOTAL | | 275,645,634 | 295,307,397 | 7.1% | 2,414,262 | 2,469,790 | 2.3% |
| >40 | Other UK Airports | 126,129 | 125,039 | 0.9% | 361,950 | 356,111 | 1.6% |
| TOTAL | | 275,771,763 | 295,432,436 | 7.1% | 2,776,212 | 2,825,901 | 1.8% |

Source: UK CAA Airport Data 2024

=== 2023 data ===
The following is a list of the 40 largest UK airports by total passenger traffic in 2023, from UK CAA statistics.

| Rank 2023 (Note: Rank is by total passengers.) | Airport | Total passengers (Note: Total passengers includes domestic, international and transit passengers.) | | | Aircraft movements (Note: Aircraft movements includes all commercial and non-commercial takeoffs and landings.) | | |
| Rank 2023 | Airport | 2022 | 2023 | Change 2022 / 23 | 2022 | 2023 | Change 2022 / 23 |
|---|---|---|---|---|---|---|---|
| 1 | London Heathrow | 61,611,838 | 79,180,434 | 28.5% | 380,305 | 456,600 | 20.1% |
| 2 | London Gatwick | 32,835,381 | 40,897,656 | 24.6% | 217,622 | 256,893 | 18.0% |
| 3 | Manchester | 23,364,471 | 28,096,783 | 20.3% | 158,575 | 180,246 | 13.7% |
| 4 | London Stansted | 23,290,097 | 27,951,291 | 20.0% | 176,914 | 195,438 | 10.5% |
| 5 | London Luton | 13,324,491 | 16,403,784 | 23.1% | 118,063 | 128,430 | 8.8% |
| 6 | Edinburgh | 11,250,211 | 14,396,794 | 28.0% | 98,065 | 115,076 | 17.3% |
| 7 | Birmingham | 9,597,485 | 11,481,365 | 19.6% | 65,644 | 86,584 | 31.9% |
| 8 | Bristol | 7,948,941 | 9,913,011 | 24.7% | 65,909 | 77,260 | 17.2% |
| 9 | Glasgow | 6,517,585 | 7,358,828 | 12.9% | 70,391 | 74,563 | 5.9% |
| 10 | Belfast International | 4,818,214 | 5,957,055 | 23.6% | 49,942 | 57,761 | 15.7% |
| 11 | Newcastle | 4,128,407 | 4,819,969 | 16.8% | 41,187 | 45,229 | 9.8% |
| 12 | Liverpool | 3,490,844 | 4,193,623 | 20.1% | 47,526 | 49,436 | 4.0% |
| 13 | Leeds Bradford | 3,288,635 | 3,989,405 | 21.3% | 33,912 | 36,413 | 7.4% |
| 14 | East Midlands | 3,186,367 | 3,932,497 | 23.4% | 64,678 | 66,212 | 2.4% |
| 15 | London City | 3,009,313 | 3,429,684 | 14.0% | 49,937 | 52,101 | 4.3% |
| 16 | Aberdeen | 1,960,307 | 2,229,918 | 13.8% | 74,098 | 73,442 | 0.9% |
| 17 | Belfast City | 1,655,164 | 2,115,153 | 27.8% | 25,368 | 29,282 | 15.4% |
| 18 | Jersey | 1,336,082 | 1,468,820 | 9.9% | 32,185 | 30,869 | 4.1% |
| 19 | Bournemouth | 734,530 | 950,206 | 29.4% | 29,186 | 20,650 | 29.2% |
| 20 | Cardiff | 859,805 | 838,529 | 2.5% | 18,793 | 15,806 | 15.9% |
| 21 | Inverness | 700,012 | 802,338 | 14.6% | 23,820 | 23,842 | 0.1% |
| 22 | Southampton | 631,458 | 754,931 | 19.6% | 20,562 | 21,998 | 7.0% |
| 23 | Guernsey | 654,446 | 694,958 | 6.2% | 28,854 | 27,872 | 3.4% |
| 24 | Isle of Man | 551,941 | 638,619 | 15.7% | 15,208 | 15,741 | 3.5% |
| 25 | Glasgow Prestwick | 445,211 | 524,880 | 17.9% | 19,034 | 24,471 | 28.6% |
| 26 | Exeter | 382,223 | 433,067 | 13.3% | 30,874 | 27,082 | 12.3% |
| 27 | Newquay | 244,675 | 408,870 | 67.1% | 24,625 | 19,384 | 21.3% |
| 28 | Norwich | 319,040 | 357,852 | 12.2% | 31,434 | 28,662 | 8.8% |
| 29 | Sumburgh | 247,538 | 259,068 | 4.7% | 17,715 | 17,426 | 1.6% |
| 30 | Teesside | 173,785 | 226,557 | 30.4% | 20,319 | 21,125 | 4.0% |
| 31 | City of Derry | 163,379 | 154,486 | 5.4% | 7,122 | 7,110 | 0.2% |
| 32 | London Southend | 89,361 | 146,072 | 63.5% | 26,624 | 31,546 | 18.5% |
| 33 | Kirkwall | 133,410 | 143,093 | 7.3% | 11,758 | 11,443 | 2.7% |
| 34 | Humberside | 92,465 | 136,976 | 48.1% | 13,103 | 16,678 | 27.3% |
| 35 | Stornoway | 102,331 | 106,237 | 3.8% | 7,384 | 7,366 | 0.2% |
| 36 | St Mary's | 86,846 | 69,404 | 20.1% | 10,381 | 8,849 | 14.8% |
| 37 | Land's End | 63,737 | 54,517 | 14.5% | 9,169 | 7,475 | 18.5% |
| 38 | Alderney | 50,924 | 49,546 | 2.7% | 7,629 | 7,237 | 5.1% |
| 39 | Farnborough | N/A (Note: Not previously reported by CAA) | 38,827 | 100.0% | N/A (Note: Not previously reported by CAA) | 32,622 | 100.0% |
| 40 | Dundee | 38,451 | 38,508 | 0.1% | 13,522 | 6,019 | 55.5% |
| TOP 40 TOTAL | | 223,379,401 | 275,645,634 | 23.4% | 2,157,437 | 2,414,262 | 11.9% |
| >40 | Other UK Airports | 1,070,406 | 126,129 | 88.2% | 420,195 | 361,950 | 13.9% |
| TOTAL | | 224,449,807 | 275,771,763 | 22.9% | 2,577,632 | 2,776,212 | 7.7% |

Source: UK CAA Airport Data 2023

=== 2022 data ===
The following is a list of the 40 largest UK airports by total passenger traffic in 2022, from UK CAA statistics.

| Rank 2022 (Note: Rank is by total passengers.) | Airport | Total passengers (Note: Total passengers includes domestic, international and transit passengers.) | | | Aircraft movements (Note: Aircraft movements includes all commercial and non-commercial takeoffs and landings.) | | |
| Rank 2022 | Airport | 2021 | 2022 | Change 2021 / 22 | 2021 | 2022 | Change 2021 / 22 |
|---|---|---|---|---|---|---|---|
| 1 | London Heathrow | 19,393,886 | 61,611,838 | 217.7% | 195,336 | 380,305 | 94.7% |
| 2 | London Gatwick | 6,261,814 | 32,835,381 | 424.4% | 55,817 | 217,622 | 289.9% |
| 3 | Manchester | 6,085,103 | 23,364,471 | 284.0% | 66,310 | 158,575 | 139.1% |
| 4 | London Stansted | 7,148,200 | 23,290,097 | 225.8% | 93,316 | 176,914 | 89.6% |
| 5 | London Luton | 4,674,800 | 13,324,491 | 185.0% | 61,703 | 118,063 | 91.3% |
| 6 | Edinburgh | 3,024,960 | 11,250,211 | 271.9% | 43,674 | 98,065 | 124.5% |
| 7 | Birmingham | 2,482,430 | 9,597,485 | 286.6% | 35,411 | 65,644 | 85.4% |
| 8 | Bristol | 2,087,772 | 7,948,941 | 280.7% | 32,278 | 65,909 | 104.2% |
| 9 | Glasgow | 2,072,546 | 6,517,585 | 214.5% | 39,713 | 70,391 | 77.2% |
| 10 | Belfast International | 2,328,276 | 4,818,214 | 106.9% | 33,964 | 49,942 | 47.0% |
| 11 | Newcastle | 1,024,930 | 4,128,407 | 302.8% | 21,421 | 41,187 | 92.3% |
| 12 | Liverpool | 1,165,508 | 3,490,844 | 199.5% | 29,327 | 47,526 | 62.1% |
| 13 | Leeds Bradford | 739,131 | 3,288,635 | 344.9% | 14,566 | 33,912 | 132.8% |
| 14 | East Midlands | 832,529 | 3,186,367 | 282.7% | 52,327 | 64,678 | 23.6% |
| 15 | London City | 720,580 | 3,009,313 | 317.6% | 14,463 | 49,937 | 245.3% |
| 16 | Aberdeen | 1,075,639 | 1,960,307 | 82.2% | 62,986 | 74,098 | 17.6% |
| 17 | Belfast City | 812,424 | 1,655,164 | 103.7% | 12,819 | 25,368 | 97.9% |
| 18 | Jersey | 678,151 | 1,336,082 | 97.0% | 22,861 | 32,185 | 40.8% |
| 19 | Doncaster Sheffield | 309,512 | 959,963 | 210.2% | 14,077 | 15,847 | 12.6% |
| 20 | Cardiff | 123,825 | 859,805 | 594.4% | 11,236 | 18,793 | 67.3% |
| 21 | Bournemouth | 200,640 | 734,530 | 266.1% | 38,304 | 29,186 | 23.8% |
| 22 | Inverness | 357,584 | 700,012 | 95.8% | 25,267 | 23,820 | 5.7% |
| 23 | Guernsey | 250,526 | 654,446 | 161.2% | 18,253 | 28,854 | 58.1% |
| 24 | Southampton | 263,131 | 631,458 | 140.0% | 11,910 | 20,562 | 72.6% |
| 25 | Isle of Man | 182,371 | 551,941 | 202.6% | 9,594 | 15,208 | 58.5% |
| 26 | Glasgow Prestwick | 78,069 | 445,211 | 470.3% | 17,126 | 19,034 | 11.1% |
| 27 | Exeter | 126,854 | 382,223 | 201.3% | 25,201 | 30,874 | 22.5% |
| 28 | Norwich | 126,043 | 319,040 | 153.1% | 30,064 | 31,434 | 4.6% |
| 29 | Sumburgh | 183,903 | 247,538 | 34.6% | 16,699 | 17,715 | 6.1% |
| 30 | Newquay | 105,554 | 244,675 | 131.8% | 32,062 | 24,625 | 23.2% |
| 31 | Teesside | 78,520 | 173,785 | 121.3% | 18,013 | 20,319 | 12.8% |
| 32 | City of Derry | 73,024 | 163,379 | 123.7% | 4,552 | 7,122 | 56.5% |
| 33 | Kirkwall | 85,665 | 133,410 | 55.7% | 11,114 | 11,758 | 5.8% |
| 34 | Stornoway | 62,791 | 102,331 | 63.0% | 6,809 | 7,384 | 8.4% |
| 35 | Humberside | 31,534 | 92,465 | 193.2% | 11,973 | 13,103 | 9.4% |
| 36 | London Southend | 94,367 | 89,361 | 5.3% | 34,114 | 26,624 | 22.0% |
| 37 | St Mary's | 72,291 | 86,846 | 20.1% | 8,935 | 10,381 | 16.2% |
| 38 | Land's End | 53,211 | 63,737 | 19.8% | 7,539 | 9,169 | 21.6% |
| 39 | Alderney | 41,279 | 50,924 | 23.4% | 5,456 | 7,629 | 39.8% |
| 40 | Dundee | 19,658 | 38,451 | 95.6% | 23,956 | 13,522 | 43.6% |
| TOP 40 TOTAL | | 65,529,031 | 224,339,364 | 242.4% | 1,270,546 | 2,173,284 | 71.1% |
| >40 | Other UK Airports | 64,325 | 110,443 | 71.7% | 358,447 | 404,348 | 12.8% |
| TOTAL | | 65,593,356 | 224,449,807 | 242.2% | 1,628,993 | 2,577,632 | 58.2% |

Source: UK CAA Airport Data 2022

=== 2021 data ===
The following is a list of the 40 largest UK airports by total passenger traffic in 2021, from UK CAA statistics.

| Rank 2021 (Note: Rank is by total passengers.) | Airport | Total passengers (Note: Total passengers includes domestic, international and transit passengers.) | | | Aircraft movements (Note: Aircraft movements includes all commercial and non-commercial takeoffs and landings.) | | |
| Rank 2021 | Airport | 2020 | 2021 | Change 2020 / 21 | 2020 | 2021 | Change 2020 / 21 |
|---|---|---|---|---|---|---|---|
| 1 | London Heathrow | 22,111,326 | 19,393,886 | 12.3% | 204,730 | 195,336 | 4.6% |
| 2 | London Stansted | 7,539,689 | 7,148,200 | 5.2% | 86,107 | 93,316 | 8.4% |
| 3 | London Gatwick | 10,173,431 | 6,261,814 | 38.4% | 80,161 | 55,817 | 30.4% |
| 4 | Manchester | 7,034,856 | 6,085,103 | 13.5% | 66,760 | 66,310 | 0.7% |
| 5 | London Luton | 5,550,821 | 4,674,800 | 15.8% | 59,769 | 61,703 | 3.2% |
| 6 | Edinburgh | 3,474,879 | 3,024,960 | 12.9% | 45,966 | 43,674 | 5.0% |
| 7 | Birmingham | 2,869,582 | 2,482,430 | 13.5% | 35,647 | 35,411 | 0.7% |
| 8 | Belfast International | 1,747,086 | 2,328,276 | 33.3% | 32,983 | 35,411 | 3.0% |
| 9 | Bristol | 2,194,524 | 2,087,772 | 4.9% | 29,191 | 32,278 | 10.6% |
| 10 | Glasgow | 1,946,474 | 2,072,546 | 6.5% | 34,715 | 39,713 | 14.4% |
| 11 | Liverpool | 1,338,415 | 1,165,508 | 12.9% | 28,468 | 29,327 | 3.0% |
| 12 | Aberdeen | 994,077 | 1,075,639 | 8.2% | 59,250 | 62,986 | 6.3% |
| 13 | Newcastle | 1,064,274 | 1,024,930 | 3.7% | 18,449 | 21,421 | 16.1% |
| 14 | East Midlands | 901,237 | 832,529 | 7.6% | 48,265 | 52,327 | 8.4% |
| 15 | Belfast City | 542,547 | 812,424 | 49.7% | 10,359 | 12,819 | 23.7% |
| 16 | Leeds Bradford | 751,091 | 739,131 | 1.6% | 12,312 | 14,566 | 18.3% |
| 17 | London City | 908,105 | 720,580 | 20.7% | 19,069 | 14,463 | 24.2% |
| 18 | Jersey | 424,922 | 678,151 | 59.6% | 16,174 | 22,861 | 41.3% |
| 19 | Inverness | 241,167 | 357,584 | 48.3% | 19,610 | 25,267 | 28.8% |
| 20 | Doncaster Sheffield | 338,829 | 309,512 | 8.7% | 12,232 | 14,077 | 15.1% |
| 21 | Southampton | 296,161 | 263,131 | 11.2% | 10,931 | 11,910 | 9.0% |
| 22 | Guernsey | 188,607 | 250,526 | 32.8% | 14,556 | 18,253 | 25.4% |
| 23 | Bournemouth | 175,907 | 200,630 | 14.1% | 28,370 | 38,304 | 35.0% |
| 24 | Sumburgh | 116,745 | 183,902 | 57.5% | 10,839 | 16,699 | 54.1% |
| 25 | Isle of Man | 162,898 | 182,371 | 12.0% | 8,480 | 9,594 | 13.1% |
| 26 | Exeter | 148,251 | 126,854 | 14.4% | 22,997 | 25,201 | 9.6% |
| 27 | Norwich | 120,258 | 126,043 | 4.8% | 24,542 | 30,064 | 22.5% |
| 28 | Cardiff | 219,984 | 123,825 | 43.7% | 10,111 | 11,236 | 11.1% |
| 29 | Newquay | 67,877 | 105,554 | 55.5% | 34,398 | 32,062 | 6.8% |
| 30 | London Southend | 401,143 | 94,367 | 76.5% | 18,401 | 34,114 | 85.4% |
| 31 | Kirkwall | 61,177 | 85,665 | 40.0% | 9,498 | 11,114 | 17.0% |
| 32 | Teesside | 38,540 | 78,520 | 103.7% | 12,731 | 18,013 | 41.5% |
| 33 | Glasgow Prestwick | 90,790 | 78,069 | 14.0% | 14,085 | 17,126 | 21.6% |
| 34 | City of Derry | 80,494 | 73,024 | 9.3% | 3,522 | 4,552 | 29.2% |
| 35 | St Mary's | 41,766 | 72,291 | 73.1% | 6,200 | 8,935 | 44.1% |
| 36 | Stornoway | 44,387 | 62,791 | 41.5% | 5,662 | 6,809 | 20.3% |
| 37 | Land's End | 34,673 | 53,211 | 53.5% | 6,297 | 7,539 | 19.7% |
| 38 | Alderney | 28,048 | 41,279 | 47.2% | 3,810 | 5,456 | 43.2% |
| 39 | Humberside | 45,273 | 31,534 | 30.3% | 10,347 | 11,973 | 15.7% |
| 40 | Benbecula | 14,199 | 24,202 | 70.4% | 2,367 | 2,931 | 23.8% |
| TOP 40 TOTAL | | 74,524,510 | 65,533,575 | 12.1% | 1,178,361 | 1,249,521 | 6.0% |
| >40 | Other UK Airports | 48,589 | 59,781 | 23.0% | 281,316 | 379,472 | 34.9% |
| TOTAL | | 74,573,099 | 65,593,356 | 12.0% | 1,459,677 | 1,628,993 | 11.6% |

Source: UK CAA Airport Data 2021

=== 2020 data ===
The following is a list of the 40 largest UK airports by total passenger traffic in 2020, from UK CAA statistics.

| Rank 2020 (Note: Rank is by total passengers.) | Airport | Total passengers (Note: Total passengers includes domestic, international and transit passengers.) | | | Aircraft movements (Note: Aircraft movements includes all commercial and non-commercial takeoffs and landings.) | | |
| Rank 2020 | Airport | 2019 | 2020 | Change 2019 / 20 | 2019 | 2020 | Change 2019 / 20 |
|---|---|---|---|---|---|---|---|
| 1 | London Heathrow | 80,890,031 | 22,111,326 | 72.7% | 478,059 | 204,730 | 57.2% |
| 2 | London Gatwick | 46,576,473 | 10,173,431 | 78.2% | 284,987 | 80,161 | 71.9% |
| 3 | London Stansted | 28,124,292 | 7,539,689 | 73.2% | 199,925 | 86,107 | 56.9% |
| 4 | Manchester | 29,397,357 | 7,034,856 | 76.1% | 202,892 | 66,760 | 67.1% |
| 5 | London Luton | 18,216,207 | 5,550,821 | 69.5% | 141,858 | 59,769 | 57.9% |
| 6 | Edinburgh | 14,737,497 | 3,474,879 | 76.4% | 131,617 | 45,966 | 65.1% |
| 7 | Birmingham | 12,650,607 | 2,869,582 | 77.3% | 109,357 | 35,647 | 67.4% |
| 8 | Bristol | 8,964,242 | 2,194,524 | 75.5% | 69,434 | 29,191 | 58.0% |
| 9 | Glasgow | 8,847,100 | 1,946,474 | 78.0% | 91,812 | 34,715 | 62.2% |
| 10 | Belfast International | 6,278,563 | 1,747,086 | 72.2% | 59,259 | 32,983 | 44.3% |
| 11 | Liverpool | 5,045,991 | 1,338,415 | 73.5% | 58,968 | 28,468 | 51.7% |
| 12 | Newcastle | 5,203,624 | 1,064,274 | 79.5% | 50,688 | 18,449 | 63.6% |
| 13 | Aberdeen | 2,912,883 | 994,077 | 65.9% | 91,248 | 59,250 | 35.1% |
| 14 | London City | 5,122,271 | 908,105 | 82.3% | 84,260 | 19,069 | 77.4% |
| 15 | East Midlands | 4,675,411 | 901,237 | 80.7% | 74,566 | 48,265 | 35.3% |
| 16 | Leeds Bradford | 3,992,862 | 751,091 | 81.2% | 35,641 | 12,312 | 65.5% |
| 17 | Belfast City | 2,455,259 | 542,547 | 77.9% | 35,382 | 10,359 | 70.7% |
| 18 | Jersey | 1,762,949 | 424,922 | 75.9% | 41,296 | 16,174 | 60.8% |
| 19 | London Southend | 2,035,535 | 401,143 | 80.3% | 36,327 | 18,401 | 49.3% |
| 20 | Doncaster Sheffield | 1,407,862 | 338,829 | 75.9% | 23,043 | 12,232 | 46.9% |
| 21 | Southampton | 1,781,457 | 296,161 | 83.4% | 36,473 | 10,931 | 70.0% |
| 22 | Inverness | 938,232 | 241,167 | 74.3% | 31,338 | 19,610 | 37.4% |
| 23 | Cardiff | 1,656,085 | 219,984 | 86.7% | 31,881 | 10,111 | 68.3% |
| 24 | Guernsey | 882,374 | 188,607 | 78.6% | 36,397 | 14,556 | 60.0% |
| 25 | Bournemouth | 803,307 | 175,907 | 78.1% | 38,540 | 28,370 | 26.4% |
| 26 | Isle of Man | 854,676 | 162,898 | 80.9% | 21,155 | 8,480 | 59.9% |
| 27 | Exeter | 1,021,784 | 148,251 | 85.5% | 44,306 | 22,997 | 48.1% |
| 28 | Norwich | 530,328 | 120,258 | 77.3% | 35,187 | 24,542 | 30.3% |
| 29 | Sumburgh | 267,456 | 116,745 | 56.3% | 18,056 | 10,839 | 40.0% |
| 30 | Glasgow Prestwick | 640,055 | 90,790 | 85.8% | 24,463 | 14,085 | 42.4% |
| 31 | City of Derry | 203,777 | 80,494 | 60.5% | 7,096 | 3,522 | 50.4% |
| 32 | Newquay | 461,478 | 67,877 | 85.3% | 46,338 | 34,398 | 25.8% |
| 33 | Kirkwall | 172,625 | 61,177 | 64.6% | 14,247 | 9,498 | 33.3% |
| 34 | Humberside | 204,463 | 45,273 | 77.9% | 18,228 | 10,347 | 43.2% |
| 35 | Stornoway | 131,441 | 44,387 | 66.2% | 9,444 | 5,662 | 40.0% |
| 36 | St Mary's | 93,927 | 41,766 | 55.5% | 12,329 | 6,200 | 49.7% |
| 37 | Teesside | 150,735 | 38,540 | 74.4% | 16,746 | 12,731 | 24.0% |
| 38 | Scatsta | 109,480 | 35,624 | 67.5% | 4,989 | 1,595 | 68.0% |
| 39 | Land's End | 64,056 | 34,673 | 45.9% | 11,177 | 6,297 | 43.7% |
| 40 | Alderney | 53,155 | 28,048 | 47.2% | 8,326 | 3,810 | 54.2% |
| TOP 40 TOTAL | | 300,317,907 | 74,545,935 | 75.2% | 2,767,335 | 1,177,589 | 57.4% |
| >40 | Other UK Airports | 159,435 | 62,788 | 60.6% | 284,478 | 203,850 | 28.3% |
| TOTAL | | 300,477,342 | 74,608,723 | 75.2% | 3,051,813 | 1,381,439 | 54.7% |

Source: UK CAA Airport Data 2020

=== 2019 data ===
The following is a list of the 40 largest UK airports by total passenger traffic in 2019, from UK CAA statistics.

| Rank 2019 (Note: Rank is by total passengers.) | Airport | Total passengers (Note: Total passengers includes domestic, international and transit passengers.) | | | Aircraft movements (Note: Aircraft movements includes all commercial and non-commercial takeoffs and landings.) | | |
| Rank 2019 | Airport | 2018 | 2019 | Change 2018 / 19 | 2018 | 2019 | Change 2018 / 19 |
|---|---|---|---|---|---|---|---|
| 1 | London Heathrow | 80,124,537 | 80,890,031 | 1.0% | 477,604 | 478,059 | 0.1% |
| 2 | London Gatwick | 46,086,089 | 46,576,473 | 1.1% | 283,919 | 284,987 | 0.4% |
| 3 | Manchester | 28,292,797 | 29,397,537 | 3.9% | 201,247 | 202,892 | 0.8% |
| 4 | London Stansted | 27,996,116 | 28,124,292 | 0.5% | 201,614 | 199,925 | 0.8% |
| 5 | London Luton | 16,769,634 | 18,216,207 | 8.6% | 136,511 | 141,858 | 3.9% |
| 6 | Edinburgh | 14,294,305 | 14,737,497 | 3.1% | 130,016 | 131,617 | 1.2% |
| 7 | Birmingham | 12,457,051 | 12,650,607 | 1.6% | 111,828 | 109,357 | 2.2% |
| 8 | Bristol | 8,699,529 | 8,964,242 | 3.0% | 72,927 | 69,434 | 4.8% |
| 9 | Glasgow | 9,656,227 | 8,847,100 | 8.4% | 97,157 | 91,812 | 5.5% |
| 10 | Belfast International | 6,268,960 | 6,278,563 | 0.2% | 60,541 | 59,259 | 2.1% |
| 11 | Newcastle | 5,334,095 | 5,203,624 | 2.4% | 53,740 | 50,688 | 5.7% |
| 12 | London City | 4,820,292 | 5,122,271 | 6.3% | 80,854 | 84,260 | 4.2% |
| 13 | Liverpool | 5,046,995 | 5,045,991 | 0.0% | 59,320 | 58,698 | 0.6% |
| 14 | East Midlands | 4,873,831 | 4,675,411 | 4.1% | 76,013 | 74,566 | 1.9% |
| 15 | Leeds Bradford | 4,038,889 | 3,992,862 | 1.1% | 38,680 | 35,614 | 7.9% |
| 16 | Aberdeen | 3,056,018 | 2,912,883 | 4.7% | 91,279 | 91,248 | 0.0% |
| 17 | Belfast City | 2,511,261 | 2,445,259 | 2.2% | 35,959 | 35,382 | 1.6% |
| 18 | London Southend | 1,480,139 | 2,035,535 | 37.5% | 32,531 | 36,327 | 11.7% |
| 19 | Southampton | 1,991,014 | 1,781,457 | 10.5% | 39,651 | 36,473 | 8.0% |
| 20 | Jersey | 1,664,175 | 1,762,949 | 5.9% | 42,436 | 41,296 | 2.7% |
| 21 | Cardiff | 1,581,131 | 1,656,085 | 4.7% | 31,085 | 31,881 | 2.6% |
| 22 | Doncaster Sheffield | 1,222,347 | 1,407,862 | 15.2% | 18,930 | 23,043 | 21.7% |
| 23 | Exeter | 931,265 | 1,021,784 | 9.7% | 39,532 | 44,306 | 12.1% |
| 24 | Inverness | 894,360 | 938,232 | 4.9% | 29,690 | 31,338 | 5.6% |
| 25 | Guernsey | 837,615 | 882,374 | 5.3% | 36,356 | 36,397 | 0.1% |
| 26 | Isle of Man | 836,656 | 854,676 | 2.2% | 23,431 | 21,155 | 9.7% |
| 27 | Bournemouth | 674,972 | 803,307 | 19.0% | 39,886 | 38,540 | 3.4% |
| 28 | Glasgow Prestwick | 681,715 | 640,055 | 6.1% | 24,904 | 24,463 | 1.8% |
| 29 | Norwich | 536,578 | 530,328 | 1.2% | 34,287 | 35,187 | 2.6% |
| 30 | Newquay | 456,888 | 461,478 | 1.0% | 41,172 | 46,338 | 12.5% |
| 31 | Sumburgh | 245,868 | 267,456 | 8.8% | 16,628 | 18,056 | 8.6% |
| 32 | Humberside | 192,526 | 204,463 | 6.2% | 18,759 | 18,228 | 2.8% |
| 33 | City of Derry | 185,843 | 203,777 | 9.7% | 6,330 | 7,096 | 12.1% |
| 34 | Kirkwall | 181,562 | 172,625 | 4.9% | 14,771 | 14,247 | 3.5% |
| 35 | Teesside | 142,080 | 150,735 | 6.1% | 16,950 | 16,746 | 1.2% |
| 36 | Stornoway | 135,700 | 131,441 | 3.1% | 10,570 | 9,444 | 10.7% |
| 37 | Scatsta | 174,934 | 109,480 | 37.4% | 8,513 | 4,989 | 41.4% |
| 38 | St Mary's | 92,195 | 93,927 | 1.9% | 12,546 | 12,329 | 1.7% |
| 39 | Land's End | 64,216 | 64,056 | 0.2% | 11,511 | 11,177 | 2.9% |
| 40 | Alderney | 53,343 | 53,155 | 0.2% | 8,981 | 8,326 | 7.3% |
| TOP 40 TOTAL | | 295,583,748 | 300,317,907 | 1.6% | 2,768,659 | 2,767,335 | 0.0% |
| >40 | Other UK Airports | 167,275 | 159,435 | 4.7% | 277,243 | 284,478 | 2.6% |
| TOTAL | | 295,751,134 | 300,477,342 | 1.6% | 3,045,902 | 3,051,813 | 0.2% |

Source: UK CAA Airport Data 2019

=== 2018 data ===
The following is a list of the 40 largest UK airports by total passenger traffic in 2018, from UK CAA statistics.

| Rank 2018 (Note: Rank is by total passengers.) | Airport | Total passengers (Note: Total passengers includes domestic, international and transit passengers.) | | | Aircraft movements (Note: Aircraft movements includes all commercial and non-commercial takeoffs and landings.) | | |
| Rank 2018 | Airport | 2017 | 2018 | Change 2017 / 18 | 2017 | 2018 | Change 2017 / 18 |
|---|---|---|---|---|---|---|---|
| 1 | London Heathrow | 78,012,825 | 80,124,537 | 2.7% | 475,783 | 477,604 | 0.4% |
| 2 | London Gatwick | 45,556,899 | 46,086,089 | 1.2% | 285,912 | 283,919 | 0.7% |
| 3 | Manchester | 27,826,054 | 28,292,797 | 1.2% | 203,689 | 201,247 | 1.2% |
| 4 | London Stansted | 25,904,450 | 27,996,116 | 8.1% | 189,919 | 201,614 | 6.2% |
| 5 | London Luton | 15,990,276 | 16,769,634 | 4.9% | 133,743 | 136,511 | 2.1% |
| 6 | Edinburgh | 13,410,343 | 14,294,305 | 6.6% | 128,675 | 130,016 | 1.0% |
| 7 | Birmingham | 12,990,303 | 12,457,051 | 4.1% | 122,067 | 111,828 | 8.4% |
| 8 | Glasgow | 9,897,959 | 9,656,227 | 2.4% | 102,766 | 97,157 | 5.5% |
| 9 | Bristol | 8,239,250 | 8,699,529 | 5.6% | 76,199 | 72,927 | 4.3% |
| 10 | Belfast International | 5,836,735 | 6,268,960 | 7.4% | 58,152 | 60,541 | 4.1% |
| 11 | Newcastle | 5,300,274 | 5,334,095 | 0.6% | 57,808 | 53,740 | 7.0% |
| 12 | Liverpool | 4,901,157 | 5,046,995 | 3.0% | 56,643 | 59,320 | 4.7% |
| 13 | East Midlands | 4,878,781 | 4,873,831 | 0.1% | 77,067 | 76,013 | 1.4% |
| 14 | London City | 4,530,439 | 4,820,292 | 6.4% | 80,490 | 80,854 | 0.5% |
| 15 | Leeds Bradford | 4,076,616 | 4,038,889 | 0.9% | 46,159 | 38,680 | 16.2% |
| 16 | Aberdeen | 3,090,642 | 3,056,018 | 1.1% | 97,007 | 91,279 | 5.9% |
| 17 | Belfast City | 2,559,846 | 2,511,261 | 1.9% | 36,332 | 35,959 | 1.0% |
| 18 | Southampton | 2,069,950 | 1,991,014 | 3.8% | 44,161 | 39,651 | 10.2% |
| 19 | Jersey | 1,637,763 | 1,664,175 | 1.6% | 46,615 | 42,436 | 9.0% |
| 20 | Cardiff | 1,465,227 | 1,581,131 | 7.9% | 28,934 | 31,085 | 7.4% |
| 21 | London Southend | 1,092,269 | 1,480,139 | 35.5% | 26,674 | 32,531 | 22.0% |
| 22 | Doncaster Sheffield | 1,355,559 | 1,222,347 | 8.5% | 17,435 | 18,930 | 8.6% |
| 23 | Exeter | 908,750 | 931,265 | 2.5% | 40,472 | 39,532 | 2.3% |
| 24 | Inverness | 874,934 | 894,360 | 2.2% | 31,002 | 29,690 | 4.2% |
| 25 | Guernsey | 843,272 | 837,615 | 0.7% | 38,209 | 36,356 | 4.8% |
| 26 | Isle of Man | 797,615 | 836,656 | 4.9% | 23,061 | 23,431 | 1.6% |
| 27 | Glasgow Prestwick | 696,309 | 681,715 | 2.1% | 24,897 | 24,904 | 0.0% |
| 28 | Bournemouth | 694,660 | 674,972 | 2.8% | 34,641 | 39,886 | 15.1% |
| 29 | Norwich | 528,153 | 536,578 | 1.6% | 37,307 | 34,287 | 8.1% |
| 30 | Newquay | 461,300 | 456,888 | 1.0% | 37,113 | 41,172 | 10.9% |
| 31 | Sumburgh | 256,418 | 245,868 | 4.1% | 22,347 | 16,628 | 25.6% |
| 32 | Humberside | 190,936 | 192,526 | 0.8% | 18,282 | 18,759 | 2.6% |
| 33 | City of Derry | 193,981 | 185,843 | 4.2% | 5,156 | 6,330 | 22.8% |
| 34 | Kirkwall | 177,248 | 181,562 | 2.4% | 14,754 | 14,771 | 0.1% |
| 35 | Scatsta | 170,847 | 174,934 | 2.4% | 8,224 | 8,513 | 3.5% |
| 36 | Durham Tees Valley | 130,911 | 142,080 | 8.5% | 19,668 | 16,950 | 13.8% |
| 37 | Stornoway | 134,148 | 135,700 | 1.2% | 10,924 | 10,570 | 3.2% |
| 38 | St Mary's | 91,852 | 92,195 | 0.4% | 11,357 | 12,546 | 10.5% |
| 39 | Land's End | 59,386 | 64,216 | 8.1% | 10,062 | 11,511 | 14.4% |
| 40 | Alderney | 54,760 | 53,343 | 2.6% | 9,707 | 8,981 | 7.5% |
| TOTAL | | 287,869,097 | 295,583,748 | 2.7% | 2,789,413 | 2,768,659 | 0.7% |

Source: UK CAA Airport Data 2018

=== 2017 data ===
The following is a list of the 40 largest UK airports by total passenger traffic in 2017, from UK CAA statistics.

| Rank 2017 (Note: Rank is by total passengers.) | Airport | Total passengers (Note: Total passengers includes domestic, international and transit passengers.) | | | Aircraft movements (Note: Aircraft movements includes all commercial and non-commercial takeoffs and landings.) | | |
| Rank 2017 | Airport | 2016 | 2017 | Change 2016 / 17 | 2016 | 2017 | Change 2016 / 17 |
|---|---|---|---|---|---|---|---|
| 1 | London Heathrow | 75,711,130 | 78,012,825 | 3.0% | 474,963 | 475,783 | 0.2% |
| 2 | London Gatwick | 43,119,628 | 45,556,899 | 5.3% | 280,666 | 285,912 | 1.9% |
| 3 | Manchester | 25,637,054 | 27,826,054 | 8.5% | 192,293 | 203,689 | 5.9% |
| 4 | London Stansted | 24,320,071 | 25,904,450 | 6.5% | 180,430 | 189,919 | 4.9% |
| 5 | London Luton | 14,645,619 | 15,990,276 | 9.2% | 128,519 | 133,743 | 4.1% |
| 6 | Edinburgh | 12,348,425 | 13,410,343 | 8.6% | 122,220 | 128,675 | 5.3% |
| 7 | Birmingham | 11,645,334 | 12,990,303 | 11.5% | 113,184 | 122,067 | 7.8% |
| 8 | Glasgow | 9,327,193 | 9,897,959 | 6.2% | 98,217 | 102,766 | 4.6% |
| 9 | Bristol | 7,610,780 | 8,239,250 | 8.3% | 73,536 | 76,199 | 3.6% |
| 10 | Belfast International | 5,147,546 | 5,836,735 | 13.4% | 55,155 | 58,152 | 5.4% |
| 11 | Newcastle | 4,807,906 | 5,300,274 | 10.2% | 56,263 | 57,808 | 2.7% |
| 12 | Liverpool | 4,778,939 | 4,901,157 | 2.6% | 62,441 | 56,643 | 9.3% |
| 13 | East Midlands | 4,653,818 | 4,878,781 | 4.8% | 73,689 | 77,067 | 4.6% |
| 14 | London City | 4,538,813 | 4,530,439 | 0.2% | 85,169 | 80,490 | 5.5% |
| 15 | Leeds Bradford | 3,612,117 | 4,076,616 | 12.9% | 44,304 | 46,159 | 4.2% |
| 16 | Aberdeen | 2,955,338 | 3,090,642 | 4.6% | 96,156 | 97,007 | 0.9% |
| 17 | Belfast City | 2,665,139 | 2,559,846 | 4.0% | 42,475 | 36,332 | 14.5% |
| 18 | Southampton | 1,947,052 | 2,069,950 | 6.3% | 42,824 | 44,161 | 3.1% |
| 19 | Jersey | 1,614,705 | 1,637,763 | 1.4% | 47,170 | 46,615 | 1.2% |
| 20 | Cardiff | 1,347,483 | 1,465,227 | 8.7% | 26,256 | 28,934 | 10.2% |
| 21 | Doncaster Sheffield | 1,255,907 | 1,335,559 | 6.3% | 16,098 | 17,435 | 8.3% |
| 22 | London Southend | 874,549 | 1,092,269 | 24.9% | 23,449 | 26,674 | 13.8% |
| 23 | Exeter | 847,257 | 908,750 | 7.3% | 40,665 | 40,472 | 0.5% |
| 24 | Guernsey | 874,818 | 843,272 | 3.6% | 39,717 | 38,209 | 3.8% |
| 25 | Inverness | 783,017 | 874,934 | 11.7% | 30,450 | 31,002 | 1.8% |
| 26 | Isle of Man | 791,651 | 797,615 | 0.8% | 28,331 | 23,061 | 18.6% |
| 27 | Glasgow Prestwick | 673,232 | 696,309 | 3.4% | 25,714 | 24,897 | 3.2% |
| 28 | Bournemouth | 667,981 | 694,660 | 4.0% | 36,922 | 34,641 | 6.2% |
| 29 | Norwich | 506,007 | 528,153 | 4.4% | 37,190 | 31,847 | 14.4% |
| 30 | Newquay | 371,500 | 461,300 | 24.2% | 30,417 | 37,113 | 22.0% |
| 31 | Sumburgh | 250,407 | 256,418 | 2.4% | 21,129 | 22,347 | 5.8% |
| 32 | City of Derry | 290,671 | 193,981 | 33.3% | 5,441 | 5,156 | 5.2% |
| 33 | Humberside | 201,650 | 190,936 | 5.3% | 22,744 | 18,282 | 19.6% |
| 34 | Kirkwall | 163,029 | 177,248 | 8.7% | 14,539 | 14,754 | 1.5% |
| 35 | Scatsta | 162,100 | 170,847 | 5.4% | 7,894 | 8,224 | 4.2% |
| 36 | Stornoway | 126,520 | 134,148 | 6.0% | 10,600 | 10,924 | 3.1% |
| 37 | Durham Tees Valley | 132,369 | 130,911 | 1.1% | 21,162 | 19,668 | 7.1% |
| 38 | St. Mary's | 95,068 | 91,852 | 3.4% | 13,164 | 11,357 | 13.7% |
| 39 | Land's End | 64,804 | 59,386 | 8.4% | 11,189 | 10,062 | 10.1% |
| 40 | Alderney | 57,595 | 54,760 | 4.9% | 10,120 | 9,707 | 4.1% |
| TOTAL | | 271,624,222 | 287,901,863 | 6.0% | 2,742,865 | 2,658,212 | 3.1% |

Source: UK CAA Airport Data 2017

=== 2016 data ===
The following is a list of the 40 largest UK airports by total passenger traffic and aircraft movements in 2016, from UK CAA statistics.

| Rank 2016 (Note: Rank is by total passengers.) | Airport | Total passengers (Note: Total passengers includes domestic, international and transit passengers.) | | | Aircraft movements (Note: Aircraft movements includes all commercial and non-commercial takeoffs and landings.) | | |
| Rank 2016 | Airport | 2015 | 2016 | Change 2015 / 16 | 2015 | 2016 | Change 2015 / 16 |
|---|---|---|---|---|---|---|---|
| 1 | London Heathrow | 74,985,748 | 75,711,130 | 1.0% | 474,087 | 474,963 | 0.2% |
| 2 | London Gatwick | 40,269,087 | 43,119,628 | 7.1% | 267,760 | 280,666 | 4.8% |
| 3 | Manchester | 23,136,047 | 25,637,054 | 10.8% | 173,165 | 192,293 | 11.0% |
| 4 | London Stansted | 22,519,178 | 24,320,071 | 8.0% | 168,629 | 180,430 | 7.0% |
| 5 | London Luton | 12,263,505 | 14,645,619 | 19.4% | 114,083 | 128,519 | 12.7% |
| 6 | Edinburgh | 11,114,587 | 12,348,425 | 11.1% | 115,286 | 122,220 | 6.0% |
| 7 | Birmingham | 10,187,122 | 11,645,334 | 14.3% | 98,015 | 113,184 | 15.5% |
| 8 | Glasgow | 8,714,307 | 9,327,193 | 7.0% | 90,790 | 98,217 | 8.2% |
| 9 | Bristol | 6,786,790 | 7,610,780 | 12.1% | 68,074 | 73,536 | 8.0% |
| 10 | Belfast International | 4,391,292 | 5,147,546 | 17.2% | 52,246 | 55,155 | 5.6% |
| 11 | Newcastle | 4,562,853 | 4,807,906 | 5.4% | 55,950 | 56,263 | 0.6% |
| 12 | Liverpool | 4,301,495 | 4,778,939 | 11.1% | 55,905 | 62,441 | 11.7% |
| 13 | East Midlands | 4,450,862 | 4,653,818 | 4.6% | 77,053 | 73,689 | 4.4% |
| 14 | London City | 4,319,301 | 4,538,813 | 5.1% | 84,753 | 85,169 | 0.5% |
| 15 | Leeds Bradford | 3,455,445 | 3,612,117 | 4.5% | 42,912 | 44,304 | 3.2% |
| 16 | Aberdeen | 3,469,525 | 2,955,338 | 14.8% | 112,357 | 96,156 | 14.4% |
| 17 | Belfast City | 2,692,713 | 2,665,139 | 1.0% | 41,782 | 42,475 | 1.7% |
| 18 | Southampton | 1,789,470 | 1,947,052 | 8.8% | 39,379 | 42,824 | 8.7% |
| 19 | Jersey | 1,554,390 | 1,614,705 | 3.9% | 46,822 | 47,170 | 0.7% |
| 20 | Cardiff | 1,160,506 | 1,347,483 | 16.1% | 25,077 | 26,256 | 4.7% |
| 21 | Doncaster Sheffield | 857,109 | 1,255,907 | 46.5% | 11,998 | 16,098 | 34.2% |
| 22 | Guernsey | 891,616 | 874,818 | 1.9% | 39,955 | 39,717 | 0.6% |
| 23 | London Southend | 900,648 | 874,549 | 2.9% | 23,538 | 23,449 | 0.4% |
| 24 | Exeter | 821,789 | 847,257 | 3.1% | 33,210 | 40,665 | 22.4% |
| 25 | Isle of Man | 781,601 | 791,651 | 1.3% | 29,370 | 28,331 | 3.5% |
| 26 | Inverness | 669,364 | 783,017 | 17.0% | 29,873 | 30,450 | 1.9% |
| 27 | Glasgow Prestwick | 610,837 | 673,232 | 10.2% | 22,765 | 25,714 | 13.0% |
| 28 | Bournemouth | 706,776 | 667,981 | 5.5% | 43,020 | 36,922 | 14.2% |
| 29 | Norwich | 459,664 | 506,007 | 10.1% | 36,045 | 37,190 | 3.2% |
| 30 | Newquay | 251,987 | 371,500 | 47.4% | 22,848 | 30,417 | 33.1% |
| 31 | City of Derry | 284,489 | 290,671 | 2.2% | 5,005 | 5,441 | 8.7% |
| 32 | Sumburgh | 271,994 | 250,407 | 7.9% | 17,171 | 21,129 | 23.1% |
| 33 | Humberside | 222,107 | 201,650 | 9.2% | 25,665 | 22,744 | 11.4% |
| 34 | Kirkwall | 160,234 | 163,029 | 1.7% | 14,199 | 14,539 | 2.4% |
| 35 | Scatsta | 253,526 | 162,100 | 36.1% | 12,221 | 7,894 | 35.4% |
| 36 | Durham Tees Valley | 140,902 | 132,369 | 6.1% | 18,702 | 21,162 | 13.2% |
| 37 | Stornoway | 127,282 | 126,520 | 0.6% | 10,952 | 10,600 | 3.2% |
| 38 | St. Mary's | 94,718 | 95,068 | 0.4% | 12,210 | 13,164 | 7.8% |
| 39 | Land's End | 54,169 | 64,804 | 19.6% | 10,425 | 11,189 | 7.3% |
| 40 | Alderney | 59,843 | 57,595 | 3.8% | 10,149 | 10,120 | 0.3% |
| TOTAL | | 254,744,874 | 271,624,222 | 6.6% | 2,633,446 | 2,742,865 | 4.2% |

Source: UK CAA Airport Data 2016

=== 2015 data ===
The following is a list of the 40 largest UK airports by total passenger traffic in 2015, from UK CAA statistics.

| Rank 2015 | Airport | Total passengers 2014 | Total passengers 2015 | Change 2014/15 |
|---|---|---|---|---|
| 1 | London Heathrow | 73,405,330 | 74,985,748 | ▲2.2% |
| 2 | London Gatwick | 38,103,667 | 40,269,087 | ▲5.7% |
| 3 | Manchester | 21,989,682 | 23,136,047 | ▲5.2% |
| 4 | London Stansted | 19,965,093 | 22,519,178 | ▲12.8% |
| 5 | London Luton | 10,484,938 | 12,263,505 | ▲17.0% |
| 6 | Edinburgh | 10,160,004 | 11,114,587 | ▲9.4% |
| 7 | Birmingham | 9,705,955 | 10,187,122 | ▲5.0% |
| 8 | Glasgow | 7,715,988 | 8,714,307 | ▲12.9% |
| 9 | Bristol | 6,339,805 | 6,786,790 | ▲7.1% |
| 10 | Newcastle | 4,516,739 | 4,562,853 | ▲1.0% |
| 11 | East Midlands | 4,510,544 | 4,450,862 | ▼1.3% |
| 12 | Belfast International | 4,033,954 | 4,391,292 | ▲8.9% |
| 13 | London City | 3,647,824 | 4,319,301 | ▲18.4% |
| 14 | Liverpool | 3,986,654 | 4,301,495 | ▲7.9% |
| 15 | Aberdeen | 3,723,662 | 3,469,525 | ▼6.8% |
| 16 | Leeds Bradford | 3,274,474 | 3,455,445 | ▲5.5% |
| 17 | Belfast City | 2,555,145 | 2,692,713 | ▲5.4% |
| 18 | Southampton | 1,831,700 | 1,789,470 | ▼2.3% |
| 19 | Jersey | 1,495,707 | 1,554,390 | ▲3.9% |
| 20 | Cardiff | 1,023,932 | 1,160,506 | ▲13.3% |
| 21 | London Southend | 1,102,358 | 900,648 | ▼18.3% |
| 22 | Guernsey | 894,602 | 891,616 | ▼0.3% |
| 23 | Doncaster Sheffield | 724,885 | 857,109 | ▲18.2% |
| 24 | Exeter | 767,404 | 821,789 | ▲7.1% |
| 25 | Isle of Man | 729,703 | 781,601 | ▲7.1% |
| 26 | Bournemouth | 661,584 | 706,776 | ▲6.8% |
| 27 | Inverness | 612,725 | 669,364 | ▲9.2% |
| 28 | Glasgow Prestwick | 913,685 | 610,837 | ▼33.1% |
| 29 | Norwich | 458,968 | 459,664 | ▲0.2% |
| 30 | City of Derry | 350,257 | 284,485 | ▼18.8% |
| 31 | Sumburgh | 264,521 | 271,994 | ▲2.8% |
| 32 | Scatsta | 279,799 | 253,526 | ▼9.4% |
| 33 | Newquay | 221,047 | 251,987 | ▲14.0% |
| 34 | Humberside | 239,173 | 222,107 | ▼7.1% |
| 35 | Kirkwall | 161,347 | 160,234 | ▼0.7% |
| 36 | Durham Tees Valley | 142,379 | 140,902 | ▼1.0% |
| 37 | Stornoway | 129,481 | 127,282 | ▼1.7% |
| 38 | St. Mary's | 90,944 | 94,718 | ▲4.1% |
| 39 | Alderney | 61,317 | 59,843 | ▼2.4% |
| 40 | Land's End | 44,475 | 54,169 | ▲21.8% |
| TOTAL | | 241,321,451 | 254,744,874 | ▲5.6% |

Source: UK CAA Airport Data 2015

=== 2014 data ===
The following is a list of the 40 largest UK airports by total passenger traffic in 2014, from UK CAA statistics.

| Rank 2014 | Airport | Total passengers 2013 | Total passengers 2014 | Change 2013/14 |
|---|---|---|---|---|
| 1 | London Heathrow | 72,367,054 | 73,405,330 | ▲1.4% |
| 2 | London Gatwick | 35,444,206 | 38,103,667 | ▲7.5% |
| 3 | Manchester | 20,751,581 | 21,989,682 | ▲6.0% |
| 4 | London Stansted | 17,852,393 | 19,965,093 | ▲11.8% |
| 5 | London Luton | 9,697,944 | 10,484,938 | ▲8.1% |
| 6 | Edinburgh | 9,775,443 | 10,160,004 | ▲3.9% |
| 7 | Birmingham | 9,120,201 | 9,705,955 | ▲6.4% |
| 8 | Glasgow | 7,363,764 | 7,715,988 | ▲4.8% |
| 9 | Bristol | 6,131,896 | 6,339,805 | ▲3.4% |
| 10 | Newcastle | 4,420,839 | 4,516,739 | ▲2.2% |
| 11 | East Midlands | 4,334,117 | 4,510,544 | ▲4.1% |
| 12 | Belfast International | 4,023,336 | 4,033,954 | ▲0.3% |
| 13 | Liverpool | 4,187,493 | 3,986,654 | ▼4.8% |
| 14 | Aberdeen | 3,440,765 | 3,723,662 | ▲8.2% |
| 15 | London City | 3,379,753 | 3,647,824 | ▲7.9% |
| 16 | Leeds Bradford | 3,318,358 | 3,274,474 | ▼1.3% |
| 17 | Belfast City | 2,541,759 | 2,555,145 | ▲0.5% |
| 18 | Southampton | 1,722,758 | 1,831,700 | ▲6.3% |
| 19 | Jersey | 1,453,863 | 1,495,707 | ▲2.9% |
| 20 | London Southend | 969,912 | 1,102,358 | ▲13.7% |
| 21 | Cardiff | 1,072,062 | 1,023,932 | ▼4.5% |
| 22 | Glasgow Prestwick | 1,145,836 | 913,685 | ▼20.3% |
| 23 | Guernsey | 886,396 | 894,602 | ▲0.9% |
| 24 | Exeter | 741,465 | 767,404 | ▲3.5% |
| 25 | Isle of Man | 739,683 | 729,703 | ▼1.3% |
| 26 | Doncaster Sheffield | 690,351 | 724,885 | ▲5.0% |
| 27 | Bournemouth | 660,272 | 661,584 | ▲0.2% |
| 28 | Inverness | 608,184 | 612,725 | ▲0.7% |
| 29 | Norwich | 463,401 | 458,968 | ▼1.0% |
| 30 | City of Derry | 384,973 | 350,257 | ▼9.0% |
| 31 | Scatsta | 298,308 | 279,799 | ▼6.2% |
| 32 | Sumburgh | 212,233 | 264,521 | ▲24.6% |
| 33 | Humberside | 236,083 | 239,173 | ▲1.3% |
| 34 | Blackpool | 262,630 | 223,998 | ▼14.7% |
| 35 | Newquay | 174,891 | 221,047 | ▲26.4% |
| 36 | Kirkwall | 159,325 | 161,347 | ▲1.3% |
| 37 | Durham Tees Valley | 161,092 | 142,379 | ▼11.6% |
| 38 | Stornoway | 122,410 | 129,481 | ▲5.8% |
| 39 | Isles of Scilly (St.Marys) | 89,170 | 90,944 | ▲2.0% |
| 40 | Alderney | 62,855 | 61,317 | ▼2.4% |
| TOTAL | | 231,469,055 | 241,500,974 | ▲4.3% |

Source: UK CAA Airport Data 1990–2014

=== 2013 data ===
The following is a list of the 40 largest UK airports by total passenger traffic in 2013, from UK CAA statistics.

| Rank 2013 | Airport | Total passengers 2012 | Total passengers 2013 | Change 2012/13 |
|---|---|---|---|---|
| 1 | London Heathrow | 70,037,417 | 72,367,054 | ▲3.3% |
| 2 | London Gatwick | 34,235,982 | 35,444,206 | ▲3.5% |
| 3 | Manchester | 19,736,502 | 20,751,581 | ▲5.1% |
| 4 | London Stansted | 17,472,699 | 17,852,393 | ▲2.2% |
| 5 | Edinburgh | 9,195,061 | 9,775,443 | ▲6.3% |
| 6 | London Luton | 9,617,697 | 9,697,944 | ▲0.8% |
| 7 | Birmingham | 8,922,539 | 9,120,201 | ▲2.2% |
| 8 | Glasgow | 7,157,859 | 7,363,764 | ▲2.9% |
| 9 | Bristol | 5,921,530 | 6,131,896 | ▲3.6% |
| 10 | Newcastle | 4,366,196 | 4,420,839 | ▲1.3% |
| 11 | East Midlands | 4,076,178 | 4,334,117 | ▲6.3% |
| 12 | Liverpool | 4,463,257 | 4,187,493 | ▼6.2% |
| 13 | Belfast International | 4,313,685 | 4,023,336 | ▼6.7% |
| 14 | Aberdeen | 3,330,126 | 3,440,765 | ▲3.3% |
| 15 | London City | 3,016,664 | 3,379,753 | ▲12.0% |
| 16 | Leeds Bradford | 2,990,517 | 3,318,358 | ▲11.0% |
| 17 | Belfast City | 2,246,202 | 2,541,759 | ▲13.2% |
| 18 | Southampton | 1,694,120 | 1,722,758 | ▲1.7% |
| 19 | Jersey | 1,468,333 | 1,453,863 | ▼1.0% |
| 20 | Glasgow Prestwick | 1,067,933 | 1,145,836 | ▲7.3% |
| 21 | Cardiff | 1,028,123 | 1,072,062 | ▲4.3% |
| 22 | London Southend | 617,027 | 969,912 | ▲57.2% |
| 23 | Guernsey | 890,746 | 886,396 | ▼0.5% |
| 24 | Exeter | 701,743 | 741,465 | ▲5.7% |
| 25 | Isle of Man | 697,123 | 739,683 | ▲6.1% |
| 26 | Doncaster Sheffield | 693,661 | 690,351 | ▼0.5% |
| 27 | Bournemouth | 692,545 | 660,272 | ▼4.7% |
| 28 | Inverness | 604,098 | 608,184 | ▲0.7% |
| 29 | Norwich | 396,676 | 463,401 | ▲16.8% |
| 30 | City of Derry | 398,209 | 384,973 | ▼3.3% |
| 31 | Scatsta | 304,480 | 298,308 | ▼2.0% |
| 32 | Blackpool | 235,238 | 262,630 | ▲11.6% |
| 33 | Humberside | 234,142 | 236,083 | ▲0.8% |
| 34 | Sumburgh | 150,567 | 212,233 | ▲41.0% |
| 35 | Newquay | 166,609 | 174,891 | ▲5.0% |
| 36 | Durham Tees Valley | 166,251 | 161,092 | ▼3.1% |
| 37 | Kirkwall | 140,683 | 159,325 | ▲13.3% |
| 38 | Stornoway | 119,411 | 122,410 | ▲2.5% |
| 39 | Isles of Scilly (St.Marys) | 97,012 | 89,170 | ▼8.1% |
| 40 | Alderney | 64,165 | 62,855 | ▼2.0% |
| TOTAL | | 223,729,006 | 231,469,055 | ▲3.5% |

Source: UK CAA Airport Data 1990–2014

=== 2012 data ===
The following is a list of the 40 largest UK airports by total passenger traffic in 2012, from UK CAA statistics.

| Rank 2012 | Airport | Total passengers 2011 | Total passengers 2012 | Change 2012/11 |
|---|---|---|---|---|
| 1 | London Heathrow | 69,433,230 | 70,037,417 | ▲0.9% |
| 2 | London Gatwick | 33,674,264 | 34,235,982 | ▲1.7% |
| 3 | Manchester | 18,892,756 | 19,736,502 | ▲4.5% |
| 4 | London Stansted | 18,052,843 | 17,472,699 | ▼3.2% |
| 5 | London Luton | 9,513,704 | 9,617,697 | ▲1.1% |
| 6 | Edinburgh | 9,385,245 | 9,195,061 | ▼2.0% |
| 7 | Birmingham | 8,616,296 | 8,922,539 | ▲3.6% |
| 8 | Glasgow | 6,880,217 | 7,157,859 | ▲4.0% |
| 9 | Bristol | 5,780,746 | 5,921,530 | ▲2.4% |
| 10 | Liverpool | 5,251,161 | 4,463,257 | ▼15.0% |
| 11 | Newcastle | 4,346,270 | 4,366,196 | ▲0.5% |
| 12 | Belfast International | 4,103,620 | 4,313,685 | ▲5.1% |
| 13 | East Midlands | 4,215,192 | 4,076,178 | ▼3.3% |
| 14 | Aberdeen | 3,082,816 | 3,330,126 | ▲8.0% |
| 15 | London City | 2,992,847 | 3,016,664 | ▲0.8% |
| 16 | Leeds Bradford | 2,976,881 | 2,990,517 | ▲0.5% |
| 17 | Belfast City | 2,397,312 | 2,246,202 | ▼6.3% |
| 18 | Southampton | 1,762,076 | 1,694,120 | ▼6.6% |
| 19 | Jersey | 1,491,332 | 1,468,333 | ▼1.5% |
| 20 | Glasgow Prestwick | 1,297,119 | 1,067,933 | ▼17.7% |
| 21 | Cardiff | 1,222,715 | 1,028,123 | ▼15.9% |
| 22 | Guernsey | 933,721 | 890,746 | ▼4.6% |
| 23 | Exeter | 717,694 | 701,743 | ▼2.2% |
| 24 | Isle of Man | 701,847 | 697,123 | ▼0.7% |
| 25 | Doncaster Sheffield | 822,877 | 693,661 | ▼15.7% |
| 26 | Bournemouth | 613,755 | 692,545 | ▲12.8% |
| 27 | London Southend | 42,439 | 617,027 | ▲1353.9% |
| 28 | Inverness | 581,956 | 604,098 | ▲3.8% |
| 29 | City of Derry | 405,697 | 398,209 | ▼1.8% |
| 30 | Norwich | 413,896 | 396,676 | ▼4.2% |
| 31 | Scatsta | 288,264 | 304,480 | ▲5.6% |
| 32 | Blackpool | 235,682 | 235,238 | ▼0.2% |
| 33 | Humberside | 274,609 | 234,142 | ▼14.7% |
| 34 | Newquay | 216,249 | 166,609 | ▼23.0% |
| 35 | Durham Tees Valley | 192,410 | 166,251 | ▼13.6% |
| 36 | Sumburgh | 143,731 | 150,567 | ▲4.8% |
| 37 | Kirkwall | 145,897 | 140,683 | ▼3.6% |
| 38 | Stornoway | 125,582 | 119,411 | ▼4.9% |
| 39 | Isles of Scilly (St.Marys) | 112,515 | 97,012 | ▼13.8% |
| 40 | Alderney | 69,546 | 64,165 | ▼7.7% |
| TOTAL | | 222,407,009 | 223,729,006 | ▲0.6% |

Source: UK CAA Airport Data 1990–2014

=== 2011 data ===
The following is a list of the 40 largest UK airports by total passenger traffic in 2011, from UK CAA statistics.

| Rank 2011 | Airport | Total passengers 2010 | Total passengers 2011 | Change 2010/11 |
|---|---|---|---|---|
| 1 | London Heathrow | 65,881,660 | 69,433,230 | ▲5.4% |
| 2 | London Gatwick | 31,375,290 | 33,674,264 | ▲7.3% |
| 3 | Manchester | 17,759,015 | 18,892,756 | ▲6.4% |
| 4 | London Stansted | 18,573,803 | 18,052,843 | ▼2.8% |
| 5 | London Luton | 8,738,717 | 9,513,704 | ▲8.9% |
| 6 | Edinburgh | 8,596,715 | 9,385,245 | ▲9.2% |
| 7 | Birmingham | 8,572,398 | 8,616,296 | ▲0.5% |
| 8 | Glasgow | 6,548,865 | 6,880,217 | ▲5.1% |
| 9 | Bristol | 5,747,604 | 5,780,746 | ▲0.6% |
| 10 | Liverpool | 5,013,940 | 5,251,161 | ▲4.7% |
| 11 | Newcastle | 4,356,130 | 4,346,270 | ▼0.2% |
| 12 | East Midlands | 4,113,501 | 4,215,192 | ▲2.5% |
| 13 | Belfast International | 4,016,170 | 4,103,620 | ▲2.2% |
| 14 | Aberdeen Airport | 2,763,708 | 3,082,816 | ▲11.5% |
| 15 | London City | 2,780,582 | 2,992,847 | ▲7.6% |
| 16 | Leeds Bradford | 2,755,110 | 2,976,881 | ▲8.0% |
| 17 | Belfast City | 2,740,341 | 2,397,312 | ▼12.5% |
| 18 | Southampton | 1,733,690 | 1,762,076 | ▲1.6% |
| 19 | Jersey | 1,463,221 | 1,491,332 | ▲1.9% |
| 20 | Glasgow Prestwick | 1,662,744 | 1,297,119 | ▼22.0% |
| 21 | Cardiff | 1,404,613 | 1,222,715 | ▼13.0% |
| 22 | Guernsey | 923,683 | 933,721 | ▲1.1% |
| 23 | Doncaster Sheffield | 876,153 | 822,877 | ▼6.1% |
| 24 | Exeter | 744,957 | 717,694 | ▼3.7% |
| 25 | Isle of Man | 675,871 | 701,847 | ▲3.8% |
| 26 | Bournemouth | 751,331 | 613,755 | ▼18.3% |
| 27 | Inverness | 530,213 | 581,956 | ▲9.8% |
| 28 | Norwich | 425,821 | 413,896 | ▼2.8% |
| 29 | City of Derry | 339,432 | 405,697 | ▲19.5% |
| 30 | Scatsta | 279,482 | 288,264 | ▲3.1% |
| 31 | Humberside | 283,160 | 274,609 | ▼3.0% |
| 32 | Blackpool | 235,340 | 235,682 | ▲0.1% |
| 33 | Newquay | 315,107 | 216,249 | ▼31.4% |
| 34 | Durham Tees Valley | 226,209 | 192,410 | ▼14.9% |
| 35 | Kirkwall | 141,399 | 145,897 | ▲3.2% |
| 36 | Sumburgh | 140,129 | 143,731 | ▲2.6% |
| 37 | Stornoway | 113,680 | 125,582 | ▲10.5% |
| 38 | Isles of Scilly (St.Marys) | 115,194 | 112,515 | ▼2.3% |
| 39 | Penzance Heliport | 89,469 | 75,206 | ▼15.9% |
| 40 | Alderney | 70,012 | 69,546 | ▼0.7% |
| TOTAL | | 213,874,459 | 222,439,776 | ▲4.0% |

Source: UK CAA Airport Data 1990–2014

=== 2010 data ===
The following is a list of the 40 largest UK airports by total passenger traffic in 2010, from UK CAA statistics.

| Rank 2010 | Airport | Total passengers 2009 | Total passengers 2010 | Change 2009/10 |
|---|---|---|---|---|
| 1 | London Heathrow | 66,036,957 | 65,881,660 | ▼0.2% |
| 2 | London Gatwick | 32,392,520 | 31,375,290 | ▼3.1% |
| 3 | London Stansted | 19,957,077 | 18,573,803 | ▼6.9% |
| 4 | Manchester | 18,724,889 | 17,759,015 | ▼5.2% |
| 5 | London Luton | 9,120,546 | 8,738,717 | ▼4.2% |
| 6 | Edinburgh | 9,049,355 | 8,596,715 | ▼5.0% |
| 7 | Birmingham | 9,102,899 | 8,572,398 | ▼5.8% |
| 8 | Glasgow | 7,225,021 | 6,548,865 | ▼9.4% |
| 9 | Bristol | 5,642,921 | 5,747,604 | ▲1.9% |
| 10 | Liverpool | 4,884,494 | 5,013,940 | ▲2.7% |
| 11 | Newcastle | 4,587,883 | 4,356,130 | ▼5.1% |
| 12 | East Midlands | 4,658,151 | 4,113,501 | ▼11.7% |
| 13 | Belfast International | 4,546,475 | 4,016,170 | ▼11.7% |
| 14 | London City | 2,796,890 | 2,780,582 | ▼0.6% |
| 15 | Aberdeen | 2,984,445 | 2,763,708 | ▼7.4% |
| 16 | Leeds Bradford | 2,574,426 | 2,755,110 | ▲7.0% |
| 17 | Belfast City | 2,621,763 | 2,740,341 | ▲4.5% |
| 18 | Southampton | 1,789,901 | 1,733,690 | ▼3.1% |
| 19 | Glasgow Prestwick | 1,817,727 | 1,662,744 | ▼8.5% |
| 20 | Jersey | 1,491,424 | 1,463,221 | ▼1.9% |
| 21 | Cardiff | 1,631,236 | 1,404,613 | ▼13.9% |
| 22 | Guernsey | 937,391 | 923,683 | ▼1.4% |
| 23 | Doncaster Sheffield | 835,768 | 876,153 | ▲4.8% |
| 24 | Bournemouth | 870,754 | 751,331 | ▼13.7% |
| 25 | Exeter | 795,721 | 744,957 | ▼6.4% |
| 26 | Isle of Man | 708,127 | 675,871 | ▼4.6% |
| 27 | Inverness | 591,397 | 530,213 | ▼10.3% |
| 28 | Norwich | 430,594 | 425,821 | ▼1.1% |
| 29 | City of Derry | 345,857 | 339,432 | ▼1.9% |
| 30 | Newquay | 386,870 | 315,107 | ▼18.5% |
| 31 | Humberside | 336,649 | 283,160 | ▼15.9% |
| 32 | Scatsta | 270,101 | 279,482 | ▲3.5% |
| 33 | Blackpool | 276,866 | 235,340 | ▼15.0% |
| 34 | Durham Tees Valley | 289,464 | 226,209 | ▼21.9% |
| 35 | Kirkwall | 150,343 | 141,399 | ▼5.9% |
| 36 | Sumburgh | 140,714 | 140,129 | ▼0.4% |
| 37 | Plymouth City | 157,933 | 128,603 | ▼18.6% |
| 38 | Isles of Scilly (St.Marys) | 120,909 | 115,194 | ▼4.7% |
| 39 | Stornoway | 123,199 | 113,680 | ▼7.7% |
| 40 | Penzance Heliport | 85,911 | 89,469 | ▲4.1% |
| TOTAL | | 221,491,568 | 213,933,050 | ▼3.4% |

Source: UK CAA Airport Data 1990–2014

=== 2009 data ===
The following is a list of the 40 largest UK airports by total passenger traffic in 2009, from UK CAA statistics.

| Rank 2009 | Airport | Total passengers 2008 | Total passengers 2009 | Change 2008/09 |
|---|---|---|---|---|
| 1 | London Heathrow | 67,054,745 | 66,036,957 | ▼1.5% |
| 2 | London Gatwick | 34,205,887 | 32,392,520 | ▼5.3% |
| 3 | London Stansted | 22,360,364 | 19,957,077 | ▼10.7% |
| 4 | Manchester | 21,219,195 | 18,724,889 | ▼11.8% |
| 5 | London Luton | 10,180,734 | 9,120,546 | ▼10.4% |
| 6 | Birmingham | 9,627,589 | 9,102,899 | ▼5.4% |
| 7 | Edinburgh | 9,006,702 | 9,049,355 | ▲0.5% |
| 8 | Glasgow | 8,178,891 | 7,225,021 | ▼11.7% |
| 9 | Bristol | 6,267,114 | 5,642,921 | ▼10.0% |
| 10 | Liverpool | 5,334,152 | 4,884,494 | ▼8.4% |
| 11 | East Midlands | 5,620,673 | 4,658,151 | ▼17.1% |
| 12 | Newcastle | 5,039,993 | 4,587,883 | ▼9.0% |
| 13 | Belfast International | 5,262,354 | 4,546,475 | ▼13.6% |
| 14 | Aberdeen | 3,290,920 | 2,984,445 | ▼9.3% |
| 15 | London City | 3,260,236 | 2,796,890 | ▼14.2% |
| 16 | Belfast City | 2,570,742 | 2,621,763 | ▲2.0% |
| 17 | Leeds Bradford | 2,873,321 | 2,574,426 | ▼10.4% |
| 18 | Glasgow Prestwick | 2,415,755 | 1,817,727 | ▼24.8% |
| 19 | Southampton | 1,945,993 | 1,789,901 | ▼8.0% |
| 20 | Cardiff | 1,994,892 | 1,631,236 | ▼18.2% |
| 21 | Jersey | 1,625,660 | 1,491,424 | ▼8.3% |
| 22 | Guernsey | 945,441 | 937,391 | ▼0.9% |
| 23 | Bournemouth | 1,083,446 | 870,754 | ▼19.6% |
| 24 | Doncaster Sheffield | 968,481 | 835,768 | ▼13.7% |
| 25 | Exeter | 956,251 | 795,721 | ▼16.8% |
| 26 | Isle of Man | 754,419 | 708,127 | ▼6.1% |
| 27 | Inverness | 678,776 | 591,397 | ▼12.9% |
| 28 | Norwich | 583,056 | 430,594 | ▼26.1% |
| 29 | Newquay | 466,448 | 386,870 | ▼17.1% |
| 30 | City of Derry | 439,033 | 345,857 | ▼21.2% |
| 31 | Humberside | 427,648 | 336,649 | ▼21.3% |
| 32 | Durham Tees Valley | 655,017 | 289,464 | ▼55.9% |
| 33 | Blackpool | 439,200 | 276,866 | ▼36.9% |
| 34 | Scatsta | 243,087 | 270,101 | ▲11.1% |
| 35 | Plymouth City | 117,823 | 157,933 | ▲34.0% |
| 36 | Kirkwall | 149,508 | 150,343 | ▲0.6% |
| 37 | Sumburgh | 156,948 | 140,714 | ▼10.3% |
| 38 | Stornoway | 131,752 | 123,199 | ▼6.5% |
| 39 | Isles of Scilly (St.Marys) | 122,863 | 120,909 | ▼4.0% |
| 40 | Penzance Heliport | 98,360 | 85,911 | ▼12.7% |
| TOTAL | | 238,753,469 | 221,491,568 | ▼7.2% |

Source: UK CAA Airport Data 1990–2014

=== 2008 data ===
| Rank | Airport | Total passengers | % change 2007/2008 | International passengers | Domestic passengers | Transit passengers | Aircraft movements | Freight (Metric tonnes) |
|---|---|---|---|---|---|---|---|---|
| 1 | London Heathrow | 67,054,745 | ▼1.5% | 61,344,438 | 5,562,516 | 147,791 | 478,693 | 1,397,054 |
| 2 | London Gatwick | 34,205,887 | ▼2.9% | 30,431,051 | 3,730,963 | 43,873 | 263,653 | 107,702 |
| 3 | London Stansted | 22,360,364 | ▼6.0% | 19,996,947 | 2,343,428 | 19,989 | 193,282 | 197,738 |
| 4 | Manchester | 21,219,195 | ▼4.0% | 18,119,230 | 2,943,719 | 156,246 | 204,610 | 141,781 |
| 5 | London Luton | 10,180,734 | ▲2.6% | 8,853,224 | 1,320,678 | 6,832 | 117,859 | 40,518 |
| 6 | Birmingham Airport | 9,627,589 | ▲4.3% | 8,105,162 | 1,471,538 | 50,889 | 112,227 | 12,192 |
| 7 | Edinburgh | 9,006,702 | ▼0.5% | 3,711,140 | 5,281,038 | 14,524 | 125,550 | 12,418 |
| 8 | Glasgow | 8,178,891 | ▼7.0% | 3,943,139 | 4,192,121 | 43,631 | 100,087 | 3,546 |
| 9 | Bristol | 6,267,114 | ▲5.7% | 5,057,051 | 1,171,605 | 38,458 | 76,517 | 3 |
| 10 | East Midlands | 5,620,673 | ▲3.8% | 4,870,184 | 746,094 | 4,395 | 93,038 | 261,507 |
| 11 | Liverpool | 5,334,152 | ▼2.5% | 4,514,926 | 814,900 | 4,326 | 84,890 | 3,740 |
| 12 | Belfast International | 5,262,354 | ▼0.2% | 2,122,844 | 3,099,995 | 39,515 | 77,943 | 36,115 |
| 13 | Newcastle | 5,039,993 | ▼10.8% | 3,506,681 | 1,509,959 | 23,353 | 72,904 | 1,938 |
| 14 | Aberdeen | 3,290,920 | ▼3.6% | 1,470,099 | 1,820,137 | 684 | 119,831 | 4,006 |
| 15 | London City | 3,260,236 | ▲12.0% | 2,600,731 | 659,494 | 11 | 94,516 | 0 |
| 16 | Leeds Bradford | 2,873,321 | ▼0.3% | 2,282,358 | 578,089 | 12,874 | 61,699 | 334 |
| 17 | Belfast City | 2,570,742 | ▲17.5% | 70,516 | 2,500,225 | 1 | 42,990 | 168 |
| 18 | Glasgow Prestwick | 2,415,755 | ▼0.3% | 1,728,020 | 685,999 | 1,736 | 42,708 | 22,966 |
| 19 | Cardiff | 1,994,892 | ▼5.5% | 1,565,991 | 412,728 | 16,173 | 37,123 | 1,334 |
| 20 | Southampton | 1,945,993 | ▼1.0% | 768,487 | 1,177,280 | 226 | 50,689 | 264 |

Source: UK CAA Official Statistics

=== 2007 data ===
| Rank | Airport | Total passengers | % change 2006/2007 | International passengers | Domestic passengers | Transit passengers | Aircraft movements | Freight (Metric tonnes) |
|---|---|---|---|---|---|---|---|---|
| 1 | London Heathrow | 68,066,028 | ▲0.8% | 62,098,911 | 5,753,476 | 213,641 | 481,476 | 1,310,987 |
| 2 | London Gatwick | 35,216,113 | ▲3.1% | 31,142,002 | 4,023,402 | 50,709 | 266,550 | 171,078 |
| 3 | London Stansted | 23,779,697 | ▲0.4% | 21,204,946 | 2,554,304 | 20,447 | 208,462 | 203,747 |
| 4 | Manchester | 22,112,625 | ▼1.5% | 18,662,468 | 3,229,255 | 220,902 | 222,703 | 165,366 |
| 5 | London Luton | 9,927,321 | ▲5.3% | 8,427,894 | 1,491,467 | 7,960 | 120,238 | 38,095 |
| 6 | Birmingham Airport | 9,226,340 | ▲0.9% | 7,592,240 | 1,541,815 | 92,285 | 114,679 | 13,585 |
| 7 | Edinburgh | 9,047,558 | ▲5.1% | 3,417,891 | 5,619,309 | 10,358 | 128,172 | 19,292 |
| 8 | Glasgow | 8,795,727 | ▼0.6% | 4,131,512 | 4,594,575 | 69,640 | 108,305 | 4,276 |
| 9 | Bristol | 5,926,774 | ▲2.9% | 4,608,290 | 1,275,566 | 42,918 | 76,428 | 20 |
| 10 | Newcastle | 5,650,716 | ▲4.0% | 3,948,594 | 1,675,013 | 27,109 | 79,200 | 785 |
| 11 | Liverpool | 5,468,510 | ▲10.2% | 4,636,149 | 827,085 | 5,276 | 86,668 | 3,709 |
| 12 | East Midlands | 5,413,360 | ▲14.5% | 4,709,855 | 696,649 | 6,856 | 93,989 | 274,753 |
| 13 | Belfast International | 5,272,664 | ▲4.6% | 1,788,807 | 3,447,248 | 36,609 | 77,395 | 38,429 |
| 14 | Aberdeen | 3,412,257 | ▲7.8% | 1,475,988 | 1,935,152 | 1,117 | 121,927 | 3,434 |
| 15 | London City | 2,912,123 | ▲23.5% | 2,214,884 | 697,239 | 0 | 91,177 | 0 |
| 16 | Leeds Bradford | 2,881,539 | ▲3.2% | 2,229,283 | 630,575 | 21,681 | 65,249 | 109 |
| 17 | Glasgow Prestwick | 2,422,332 | ▲1.0% | 1,827,592 | 593,117 | 1,623 | 47,910 | 31,517 |
| 18 | Belfast City | 2,186,993 | ▲3.9% | 93,547 | 2,093,320 | 126 | 43,022 | 1,057 |
| 19 | Cardiff | 2,111,148 | ▲4.3% | 1,665,247 | 428,260 | 17,641 | 43,963 | 2,391 |
| 20 | Southampton | 1,965,686 | ▲2.8% | 767,416 | 1,198,006 | 264 | 54,183 | 297 |

Source: UK CAA Official Statistics

=== 2006 data ===
| Rank | Airport | Total passengers | % change 2005/2006 | International passengers | Domestic passengers | Transit passengers | Aircraft movements | Freight (Metric tonnes) |
|---|---|---|---|---|---|---|---|---|
| 1 | London Heathrow | 67,527,925 | ▼0.6% | 61,345,841 | 5,993,386 | 188,696 | 477,048 | 1,263,128 |
| 2 | London Gatwick | 34,163,579 | ▲4.2% | 30,018,783 | 4,061,562 | 83,234 | 263,363 | 211,857 |
| 3 | London Stansted | 23,687,013 | ▲7.7% | 21,002,260 | 2,678,092 | 6,661 | 206,693 | 224,312 |
| 4 | Manchester | 22,442,855 | ▲0.2% | 18,601,604 | 3,522,158 | 319,093 | 229,729 | 148,957 |
| 5 | London Luton | 9,425,908 | ▲3.0% | 7,875,084 | 1,539,745 | 11,079 | 116,131 | 17,993 |
| 6 | Birmingham Airport | 9,147,384 | ▼2.5% | 7,532,792 | 1,523,212 | 91,380 | 119,490 | 14,681 |
| 7 | Glasgow | 8,848,755 | ▲0.6% | 4,245,338 | 4,575,124 | 28,293 | 110,034 | 6,289 |
| 8 | Edinburgh | 8,611,345 | ▲1.8% | 2,743,220 | 5,863,431 | 4,694 | 126,914 | 36,389 |
| 9 | Bristol | 5,757,963 | ▲9.6% | 4,297,696 | 1,412,526 | 47,741 | 84,583 | 32 |
| 10 | Newcastle | 5,431,976 | ▲4.4% | 3,624,228 | 1,783,134 | 24,614 | 81,655 | 306 |
| 11 | Belfast International | 5,038,692 | ▲4.4% | 1,533,065 | 3,482,199 | 23,428 | 77,652 | 38,417 |
| 12 | Liverpool | 4,963,776 | ▲12.5% | 4,078,245 | 884,215 | 1,316 | 91,263 | 5,724 |
| 13 | East Midlands | 4,727,996 | ▲13.0% | 4,048,071 | 672,748 | 7,177 | 88,592 | 272,303 |
| 14 | Aberdeen | 3,164,042 | ▲10.9% | 1,325,989 | 1,836,635 | 1,418 | 116,971 | 4,022 |
| 15 | Leeds Bradford | 2,792,686 | ▲7.0% | 2,154,982 | 632,235 | 5,469 | 66,921 | 101 |
| 16 | Glasgow Prestwick | 2,397,412 | ▼0.4% | 1,824,523 | 570,405 | 2,484 | 48,189 | 28,537 |
| 17 | London City | 2,358,184 | ▲18.1% | 1,738,346 | 619,813 | 25 | 79,436 | 0 |
| 18 | Belfast City | 2,105,769 | ▼5.9% | 51,948 | 2,053,649 | 172 | 39,411 | 827 |
| 19 | Cardiff | 2,024,428 | ▲13.8% | 1,628,245 | 364,852 | 31,331 | 42,055 | 2,212 |
| 20 | Southampton | 1,912,979 | ▲4.2% | 619,219 | 1,293,483 | 277 | 55,786 | 195 |

Source: UK CAA Official Statistics

== See also ==
- Air transport in the United Kingdom
- List of airports in the United Kingdom and the British Crown Dependencies
- Transport in the United Kingdom
