= Westward Airways =

Westward Airways may refer to:

- Westward Airways (Nebraska), a defunct airline based in Scottsbluff, Nebraska, that operated 2004–2005
- Westward Airways (United Kingdom), an airline based at Land's End Airport, Cornwall, England
