= St Mary's Airport, Isles of Scilly =

St Mary's Airport Isles of Scilly Airport Ayrborth An Nor (Cornish)
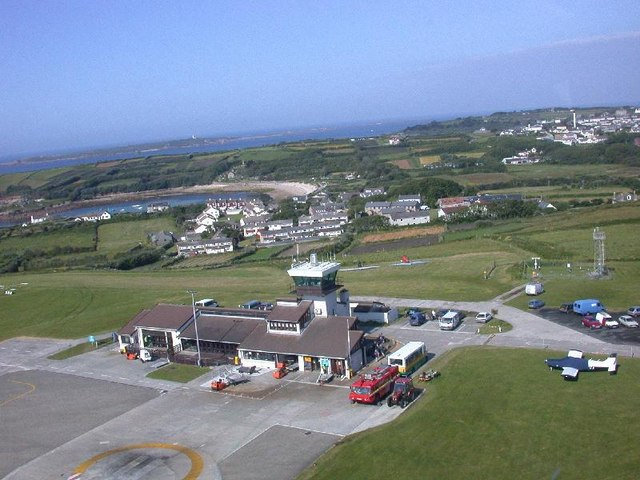
- IATA: ISC; ICAO: EGHE

Summary
- Airport type: Public
- Operator: Council of the Isles of Scilly
- Serves: Isles of Scilly
- Location: St Mary's, Isles of Scilly
- Elevation AMSL: 116 ft (35 m)
- Coordinates: 49°54′48″N 006°17′30″W
- Website: www.scilly.gov.uk/environment-transport/isles-scilly-airport

Map
- Location in the Isles of Scilly EGHE (Cornwall) EGHE (England)

Runways
Direction	Length		Surface
Direction	m	ft	Surface
09/27	525	1,722	Asphalt/grass
14/32	694	2,277	Asphalt

Helipads
Number	Length		Surface
Number	m	ft	Surface
18/36	400	1,312	Grass

Statistics (2024)
- Passengers: 68,086
- Passenger change 23-24: ▼1.9%
- Aircraft movements: 9,082
- Movements change 23–24: ▲2.6%
- Sources: UK AIP at NATS; Statistics from the UK Civil Aviation Authority

St Mary's Airport (Cornish: Ayrborth An Nor) or Isles of Scilly Airport (IATA: ISC, ICAO: EGHE) is an airport located 1 nautical mile (1.9 km; 1.2 mi) east of Hugh Town on St Mary's in the Isles of Scilly, to the south west of Cornwall. It is the only fixed-wing airport serving the Isles of Scilly, handling most air traffic to and from the Isles, in addition to a helipad on the island of Tresco. The airport is owned by the Duchy of Cornwall and currently is operated by the Council of the Isles of Scilly.

== History ==
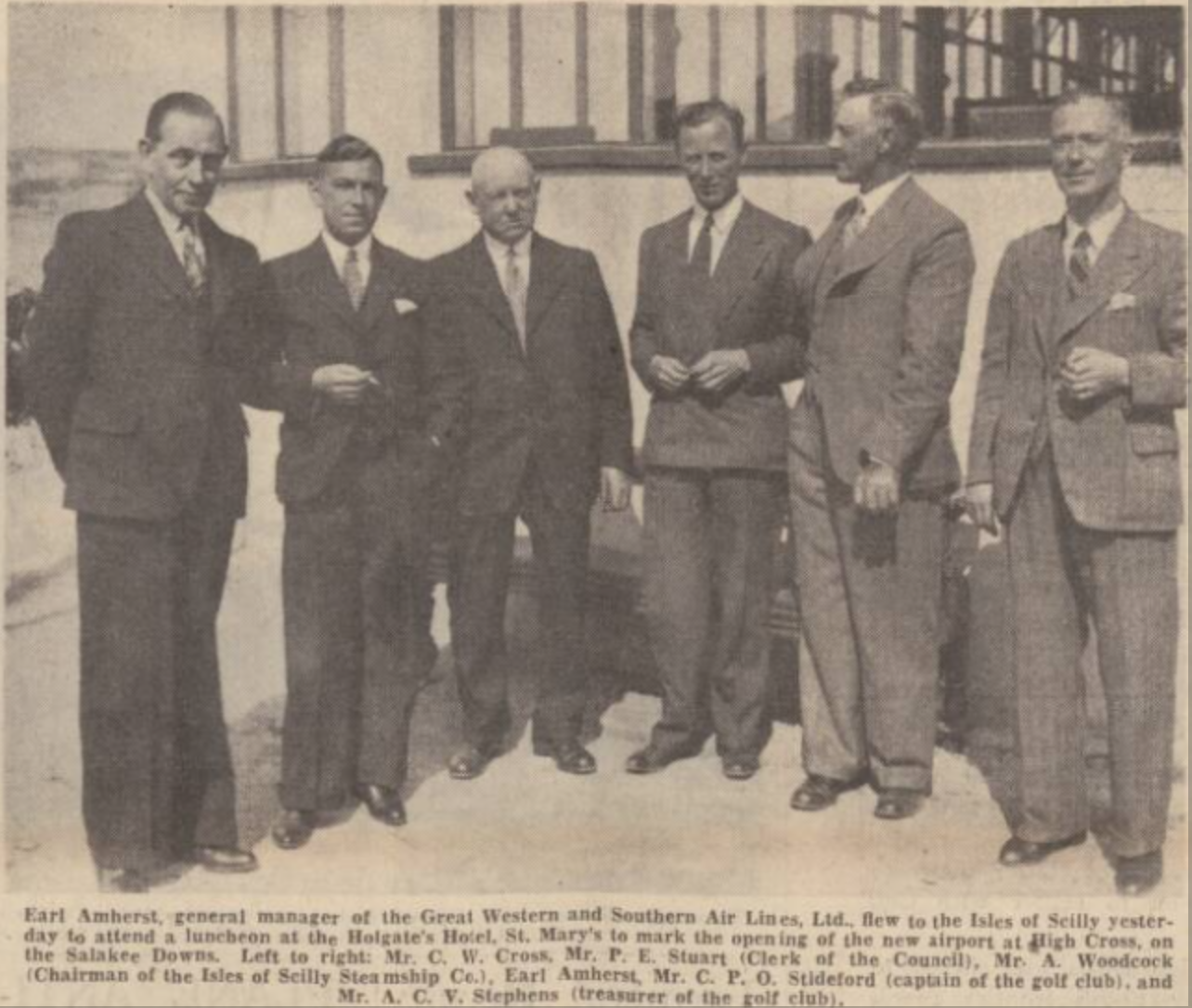
Western Morning News. Thursday 17 August 1939. Jeffery Amherst, 5th Earl Amherst, general manager of the Great Western and Southern Air Lines Ltd., marking the opening of the new airport. Left to right: Mr. C.W. Cross, Mr. P.E. Stuart (Clerk of the council), Mr. A. Woodcock (Chairman of the Isles of Scilly Steamship Co.), Earl Amherst, Mr. C.P.O. Stideford (captain of the golf club), and Mr. A.C.V. Stephens (treasurer of the golf club).

On 15 September 1937, Olley Air Service's subsidiary Channel Air Ferries started the first scheduled service between Land's End and St Mary's, flying de Havilland Dragons. Initially, however, the planes landed on the St Mary's golf course. St Mary's Airport was first opened in August 1939, after being converted from High Cross Farm.

In 1938, Great Western and Southern Airlines took over Olley Air Service and Channel Air Ferries. It continued the service throughout World War II, during which it replaced the Dragons with de Havilland Dragon Rapides. On 1 February 1947 this operation was taken over by British European Airways (BEA). In August 1949 a control tower and a passenger waiting room were completed at St Mary's.

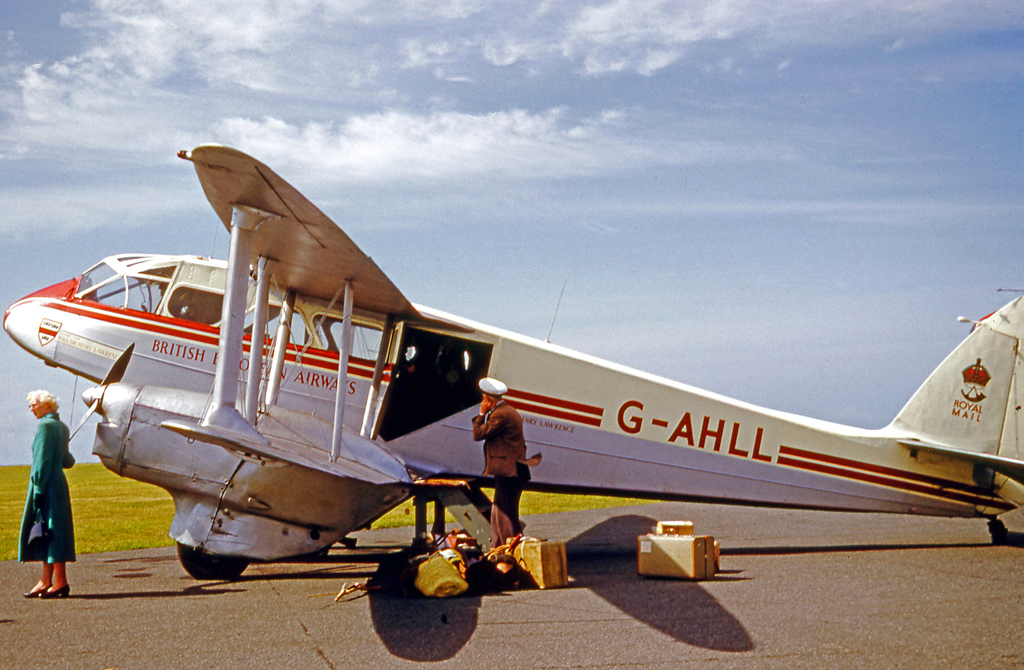
British European Airways De Havilland Dragon Rapide at St Mary's airfield in 1958 before departure to Lands End airport

On 2 May 1964, BEA replaced its Dragon Rapides on the Land's End route with a single Sikorsky S-61 helicopter, operated by BEA Helicopters. From 1 September 1964 the route was to the new Penzance Heliport. BEA Helicopters later became British Airways Helicopters, and subsequently British International Helicopters. A second helicopter was eventually added to the service in the summers.

Mayflower Air Services started services to the airport in 1961; this operation was taken over by Scillonian Air Services in 1963, itself taken over by British Westpoint Airlines in 1964. Scillonia Airways operated services to the airport from 1966 to 1970. Westward Airways, not to be confused with Westward Airways (Lands End), operated services from 1967 to 1970. Brymon Airways operated services from June 1972 to March 1991, initially with Britten-Norman Islander aircraft, and two years later, de Havilland Canada DHC-6 Twin Otters.

In 1975, a new terminal was opened by the then Prime Minister Harold Wilson.

In 1984, Isles of Scilly Skybus started flights to St Mary's from Land's End, initially freight and charter. Scheduled services started on 1 April 1987, flying Islanders and, later, Twin Otters.

The current 600-metre (2,000 ft) asphalt runway, 15/33, was built in 1991.

After being in operation for 48 years, the helicopter service between St Mary's and the mainland UK ceased operations in October 2012, leaving Skybus as the sole remaining air link for the Isles of Scilly. A helicopter service operated between Land's End Airport and St. Mary's in summer 2018.

In May 2013, the Isles of Scilly Steamship Company and the Council of the Isles of Scilly submitted a joint bid for finance from the European Regional Development Fund for improvements to the terminal, new lighting and navigational systems and runway resurfacing, together with runway resurfacing at Land's End Airport. In May 2014, the European Commission gave its approval. The upgrades at St Mary's are expected to cost £6.5 million.

== Facilities ==
The terminal at the airport is open all year round whilst the airport is in operation. It has a buffet, toilets, as well as access to wheelchairs upon request. The airport is used as a landing area for some emergency services such as the HM Coastguard Search and Rescue Aircraft (based out of Newquay Airport) and the Cornwall Air Ambulance, as well as being the administrative base for the Isles of Scilly Fire and Rescue Service.

== Airlines and destinations ==
As of July 2020, St Mary's Airport has regular service to the following destinations:

Airlines	Destinations
Isles of Scilly Skybus	Land's End, Newquay (Suspended); Seasonal: Exeter
Starspeed	Penzance

== Statistics ==
=== Passengers and aircraft movements ===
St Mary's Airport passenger totals 2021–2024 (thousands)

Traffic statistics at St Mary's Airport
Year	Passengers (Note: The number of domestic passengers handled)	Passengers % change	Aircraft (Note: The number of all aircraft takeoffs and landings at the airport)	Aircraft % change	Freight (tonnes)	Freight % change
2021	72,291	Steady	8,935	Steady	95	Steady
2022	86,846	▲20.1	10,381	▲16.2	97	▲2.1
2023	69,404	▼20.1	8,849	▼14.8	111	▲14.4
2024	68,086	▼1.9	9,082	▲2.6	54	▼51.4

=== Routes ===
Busiest routes to and from St Mary's (2023)
Rank	Airport	Total passengers	Change 2022/23
1	Exeter	8,063	▼31.8%
2	Newquay	1,530	▼27.3%
3	Land's End	n/a	Steady
4	Penzance	n/a	Steady

== Incidents and accidents ==
- On 16 July 1983, a British Airways Helicopters passenger helicopter, on a scheduled flight from Penzance Heliport, crashed into the sea 2 NM (3.7 km; 2.3 mi) short of St Mary's Airport. Nineteen passengers and one crew member were killed; six survivors (four passengers and two crew) were picked up by the St Mary's Lifeboat.
