= Isles of Scilly Skybus =

British airline

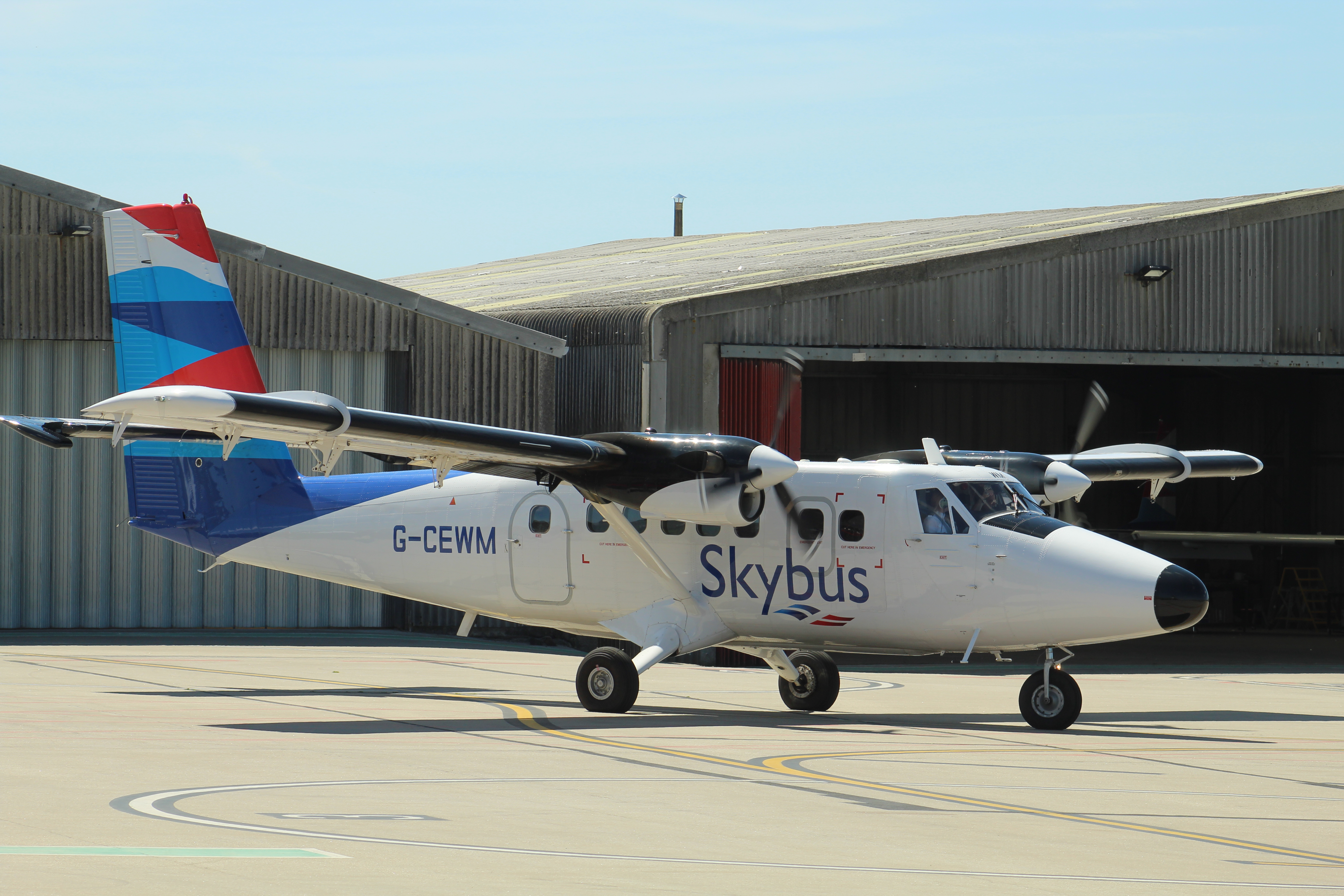
- Twin Otter
IATA	ICAO	Call sign
8Y	IOS	SCILLONIA
- Founded: March 1984
- Commenced operations: August 1984 - schedules on 1 April 1987
- AOC #: 1086
- Fleet size: 9
- Destinations: 5
- Parent company: Isles of Scilly Steamship Company
- Headquarters: Penzance, United Kingdom
- Key people: Jonathan Hinkles (MD)
- Website: skybus.co.uk

Isles of Scilly Skybus is a British airline which operates year-round scheduled services to the Isles of Scilly from Land's End Airport and Newquay Airport in Cornwall, and seasonal scheduled services from Exeter. The airline's head office is located in the Isles of Scilly Travel Centre in Penzance, Cornwall.

Isles of Scilly Skybus Limited holds a United Kingdom Civil Aviation Authority Type B Operating Licence; it is permitted to carry passengers, cargo and mail on aircraft with fewer than 20 seats and/or weighing less than 10 tonnes.

The airline is owned by the Isles of Scilly Steamship Company. The parent company operates shipping services to the Isles of Scilly in its own name, and also owned the now defunct Westward Airways and Island Helicopters businesses.

== History ==
The airline was established in March 1984 and started operations in August 1984. Isles of Scilly Skybus originated as an air charter operator at Land's End aerodrome which operated high frequency services to the Isles of Scilly. Following the withdrawal of Brymon Airways routes to and from the islands the operator stepped in, initially operating services to Plymouth. This route was later dropped but with the addition of Twin Otter aircraft the route network expanded to its current make-up. It is wholly owned by the Isles of Scilly Steamship Company which also runs the passenger ferry, Scillonian III, and freight services from Penzance to the Islands.

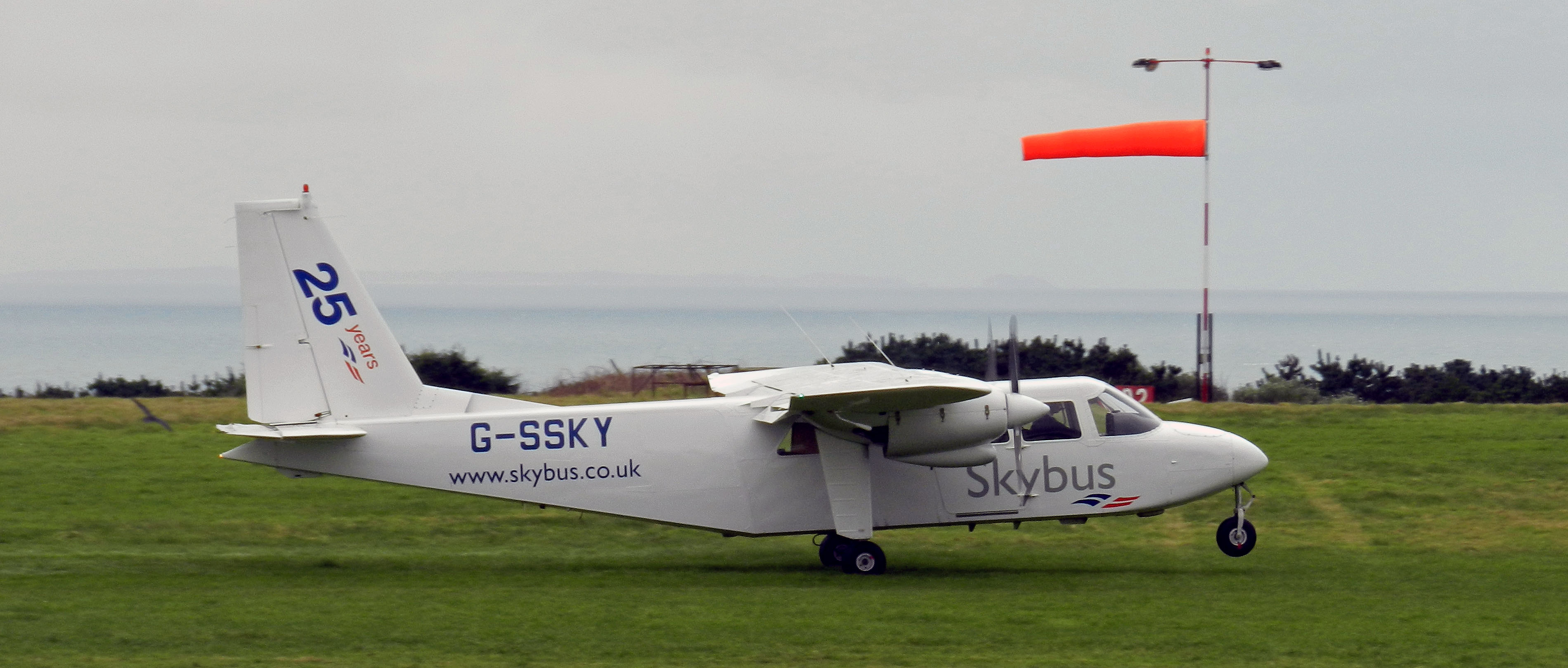
Britten-Norman BN-2 Islander

Skybus celebrated 25 years of service in June 2009, painting the aircraft tails with the 25 years mark. An extra Twin Otter aircraft was sourced for the beginning of the 2013 season following the cessation of helicopter services to and from the islands. Flights to Bristol Airport and Southampton Airport were dropped at the end of the 2012 season to concentrate on services from Exeter, Newquay and Land's End.

In 2025, the airline appointed former Loganair CEO Jonathan Hinkles as its managing director, and subsequently agreed to wet-lease two Twin Otter aircraft to Aurigny for its Alderney operation. The first Skybus-operated flight between Guernsey and Alderney took place on 1 November 2025.

On 7 November 2025, it was announced that Skybus is to take over the Newquay to London Gatwick Public Service Obligation (PSO) route which was previously operated by the now-defunct Eastern Airways. The service was originally due to begin on 23 November using a wet-leased ATR 72-500 from Blue Islands, though that carrier would subsequently suspend trading on 14 November. On 21 November 2025, Skybus confirmed that the route will commence as planned and will be operated by UK-based airline and ACMI specialist Ascend Airways using a Boeing 737 aircraft. From 7 December 2025, Skybus instead began using an Embraer E190 aircraft, wet-leased from Titan Airways, to operate the service.

In January 2026, Universal Air took over the operation of the PSO route on Skybus' behalf using a 78-seat De Havilland Canada DHC-8-400.

== Destinations ==
Aircraft are based at Land's End Airport, Newquay Airport, and St. Mary's Airport. Skybus also bases aircraft and crew at Guernsey Airport and Southampton Airport to operate on behalf of Aurigny.

Isles of Scilly Skybus destinations (as of 2026)
County	City	Airport	Notes	Refs
France	Saint-Brieuc	Saint-Brieuc–Armor Airport	Terminated	
United Kingdom	Bristol	Bristol Airport	Terminated	
United Kingdom	Cardiff	Cardiff Airport	Terminated	
United Kingdom	Exeter	Exeter Airport	Seasonal	
United Kingdom	Land's End	Land's End Airport	Hub	
United Kingdom	London	London Gatwick Airport	Terminated	
United Kingdom	Newquay	Newquay Airport	(suspended)	
United Kingdom	Plymouth	Plymouth City Airport	Airport closed	
United Kingdom	Southampton	Southampton Airport	Terminated	
United Kingdom	St Mary's	St Mary's Airport, Isles of Scilly	Focus city	

Destinations served on behalf of Aurigny (as of 2025)
County	City	Airport	Notes	Refs
Guernsey	Guernsey	Guernsey Airport	Hub	
Guernsey	Alderney	Alderney Airport	Focus city	
United Kingdom	Southampton	Southampton Airport	Hub	

== Fleet ==
The Isles of Scilly Skybus fleet includes the following aircraft:

Isles of Scilly Skybus fleet (as of April 2026)
Aircraft	In service	Orders	Passengers	Notes
De Havilland Canada DHC-6 Twin Otter	5	1	17	(as of October 2025)
Britten-Norman BN-2 Islander	3		8	
Total	8	1		
