= Westward Airways (United Kingdom) =

IATA	ICAO	Call sign
–	–	–
- Founded: 1971
- Ceased operations: 2009
- Hubs: Land's End Airport
- Fleet size: 4
- Headquarters: Cornwall, United Kingdom
- Key people: Brian Butterfield, CEO

== Westward Airways no. 1 ==
Westward Airways Ltd. was founded by Captain Howard Levett Fry (previously Imperial Airways/BOAC/British Airways pilot) in late 1968 to operate a network of scheduled services from the West Country using Britten-Norman Islanderss. While awaiting formal confirmation of route licences, a six-times daily shuttle service between London's Gatwick and Heathrow Airports was inaugurated on 25 June 1969, flown by an Islander. A week later, on July 1, a daily return schedule was begun linking Plymouth and Newquay with London's main airports. The acquisition of another Islander permitted the opening of a second route between Gatwick and the Isles of Scilly.

Early in 1970 further extensions to the network were sought, but with the exception of Bournemouth none of these options were ever exercised, since on 23 February 1970 one of the Islanders was badly damaged whilst landing at St Mary's airfield. In May 1970 Westward managed to open a daily service between Plymouth and Jersey and later in the summer, Bournemouth became an en-route stop between Plymouth and Heathrow.

During the first six months of operation, Westward had carried nearly 5,200 passengers and while traffic continued to be apparently healthy, during the second season the heavy burden of leasing aircraft and exorbitant handling costs at the major London airports was taking its toll. Westward estimated that it would need up to £85,000 in additional finance, but despite some promising leads, amongst whom was Harold Bamberg of British Eagle, in the event no further funds were forthcoming. Thus, on 16 October 1970, after just 15 months in operation it was closed down.

== Westward Airways (Land's End) ==
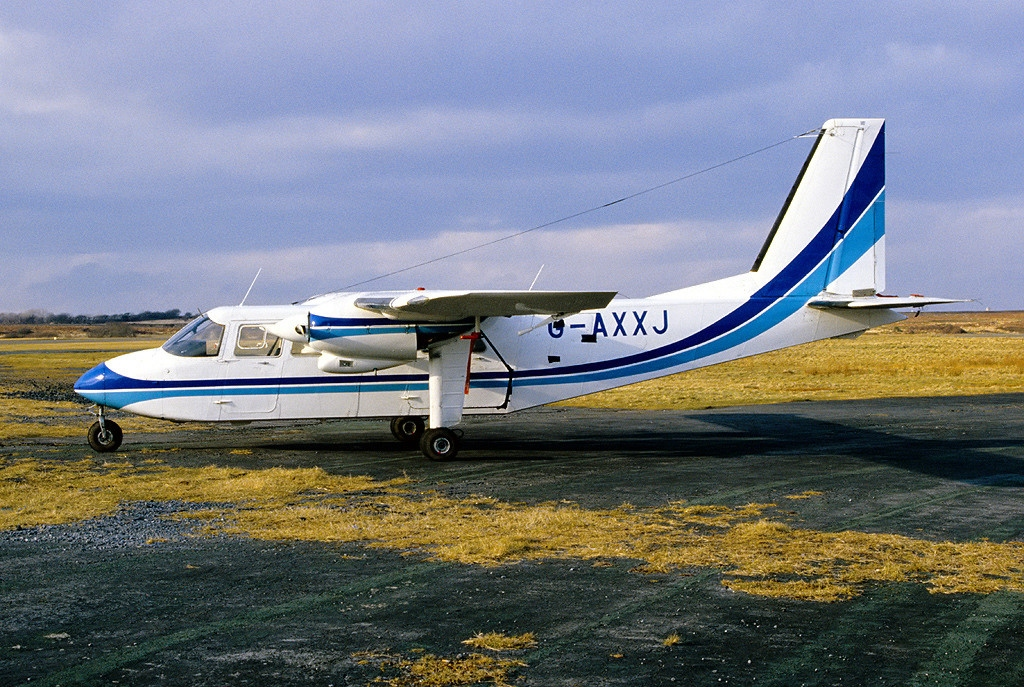
The Britten-Norman Islander which was leased but never operated

Westward Airways (Land's End) Ltd. was an airline based at Land's End Airport, near St Just and Penzance in Cornwall, England, UK. The small air carrier held a United Kingdom Civil Aviation Authority Type B Operating Licence, and it was permitted to carry passengers, cargo and mail on aircraft with fewer than 20 seats and/or weighing less than 10 tonnes.

Until February 2009 it operated sight seeing flights in the local area, also running the former Lands End Flying School and is the operator of Land's End Airport. After a review of the operations, it was decided to close the Lands End Flying School as of Saturday 31 January 2009, after which point Westward Airways also terminated the operation of sightseeing flights. Whilst the two Cessna 152s were disposed of, the remaining pair of Cessna 172s were to be transferred to Westward Airway's sister company, the Isles of Scilly Skybus, who resumed sightseeing flights under their own AOC.

The airline is owned by the Isles of Scilly Steamship Company, which operates shipping services to the Isles of Scilly in its own name, and also owns Isles of Scilly Skybus, which operates air services to the islands.

== Fleet ==
The company operates two Cessna 152s and two Cessna 172s
