= Scatsta Airport =

Former airport in the Shetland Islands

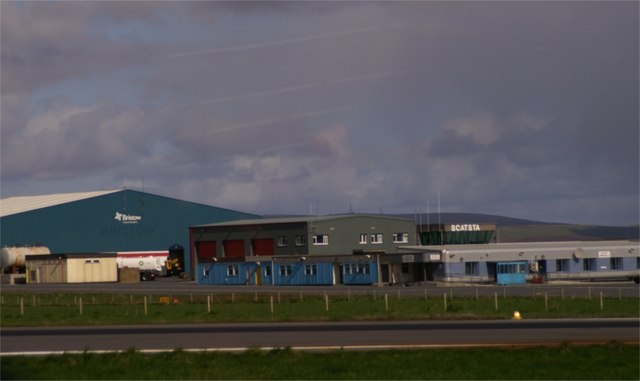
- Terminal buildings
- IATA: SCS; ICAO: EGPM

Summary
- Airport type: Private
- Owner: Shetland Islands Council
- Operator: Serco (until June 2020)
- Serves: Shetland
- Elevation AMSL: 81 ft (25 m)
- Coordinates: 60°25′58″N 001°17′46″W

Map
- Location in Shetland

Runways
Direction	Length		Surface
Direction	m	ft	Surface
06/24	1,360	4,462	Asphalt

Statistics (2018)
- Passengers: 174,934
- Passenger change 17-18: ▲2.4%
- Aircraft movements: 8,513
- Movements change 17-18: ▲3.5%
- Sources: UK AIP at NATS

Scatsta Airport (IATA: SCS, ICAO: EGPM) was a commercial airport on the island of Mainland, Shetland in Scotland located 17 nautical miles (31 km; 20 mi) north of Lerwick and 5 mi (8 km) southwest of Sullom Voe Terminal.

It is owned by Shetland Islands Council and was operated by Serco on behalf of the aerodrome licensee BP (Exploration).

Scatsta Airport fully closed to all operations on 30 June 2020.

== History ==
The airport was first developed in 1940 as RAF Scatsta, a Royal Air Force fighter plane base to support Coastal Command flying boat operations at RAF Sullom Voe, and was the most northerly base in the British Isles.

Construction started in spring 1940, of two runways. One was 1,400 yd (1,300 m) long on a heading of 130 degrees and the other was 1,510 yd (1,380 m) long on a heading of 250 degrees. The first runway was completed in April 1941. The main contractor for the construction of the aerodrome was the Zetland County Council.

In November 1944 Scatsta was used as a support base and diversion point for Lancasters from 617 squadron, the famous "Dam Busters", led by Wing Commander J. B. Tait, on Operation Catechism, which bombed and sank Tirpitz near Håkøy Island, Tromsø.

After World War II Scatsta Aerodrome lay dormant except for the landing of a US Coast Guard HC-130 Hercules on 24 May 1969, in connection with the LORAN navigation station which had been established at the north west end of runway 13/31.

It was abandoned after World War II, but reinstated as a civilian airport in 1978 to support the Shetland oil industry, and the Sullom Voe oil terminal in particular.

In 2008 Bristow Helicopters won an integrated contract to provide five major oil and gas companies with logistics via fixed-wing flights from Scatsta and onward helicopter flights to various platforms, rigs and ships around the northern North Sea and Atlantic Ocean.

The airport had received significant upgrades to allow for commercial operations, of note two hangars (one 80m x 41m built in 2010 and one 47m x 31m refurbished in 2011) provided space for up to 10 large helicopters, the passenger terminal was refurbished in 2012 with a new control tower added and there is a fire station with three vehicle bays.

By August 2018 Scatsta was the sixth largest airport in Scotland, ranked by international passengers. This classification may have been on the basis of helicopter flights to and from oil platforms in the Norwegian and/or Faroes sectors of the North Atlantic/North Sea oil region, or some classification of flights to foreign-registered (though UK-crewed and serviced) oil platforms as being "foreign" destinations. The only fixed wing route operating regularly from Scatsta was a shuttle to and from Aberdeen operated by Eastern Airways, to ferry offshore crew to Scatsta for onward travel via helicopter to oil platforms, and also mainland workers at the Sullom Voe Terminal commonly working either a two-week on/off shift or 10 days on, four days off rota.

== Closure ==
On 4 March 2020, the integrated contract was awarded to Babcock MCS who intended to use Sumburgh Airport in the south of Shetland. With the loss of this contract Scatsta airport announced that it would be closing in the summer of 2020 with a loss of 65 jobs. Shetland Council are now seeking alternative uses for the airfield infrastructure.

== See also ==
- List of airports in the United Kingdom
- List of Royal Air Force stations
- List of former Royal Air Force stations
