= Land's End Airport =

Land's End Airport Ayrborth Pedn an Wlas

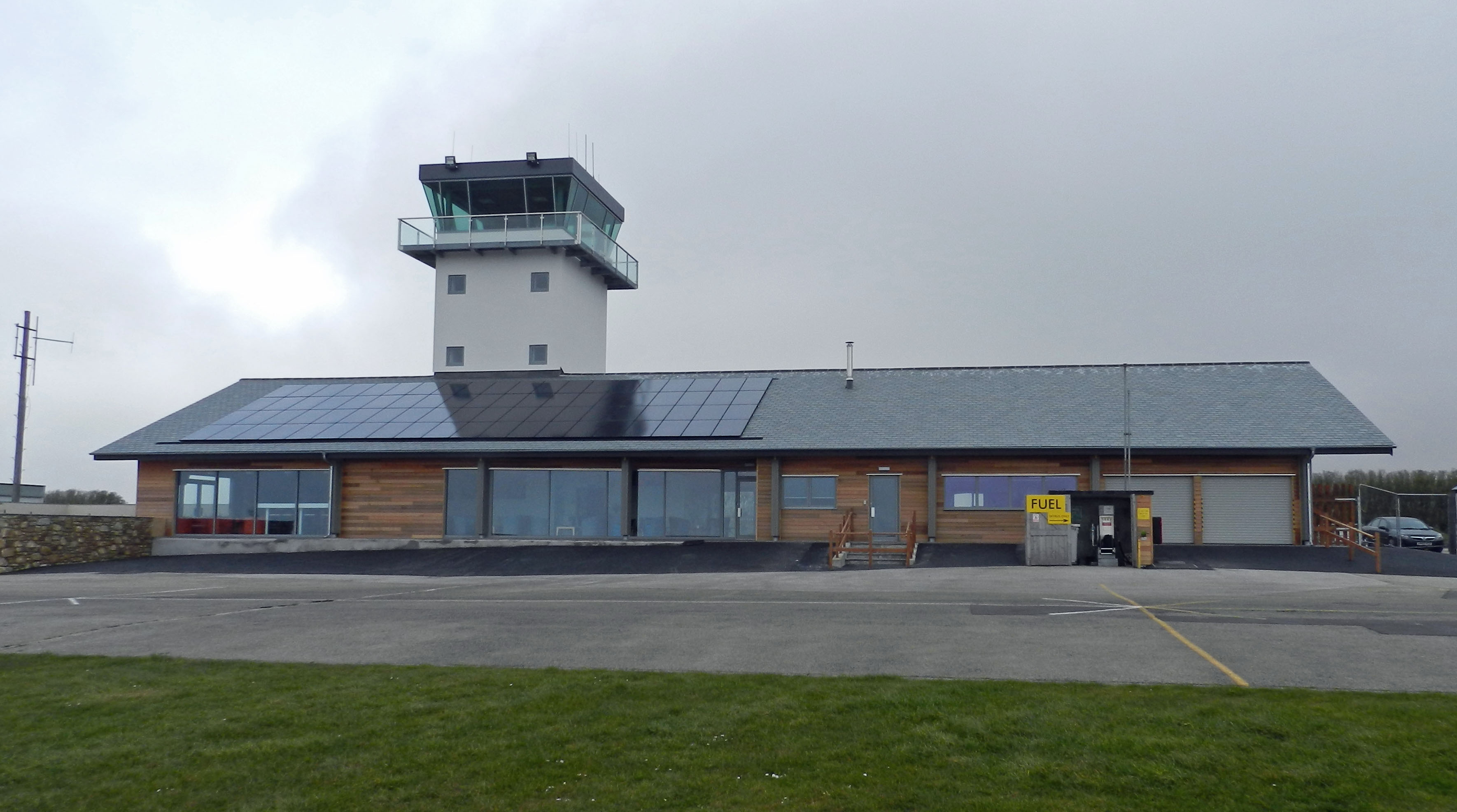
- IATA: LEQ; ICAO: EGHC

Summary
- Airport type: Private
- Operator: Land's End Airport Ltd
- Serves: St Just in Penwith
- Location: St Just, Cornwall, England
- Elevation AMSL: 401 ft (122 m)
- Coordinates: 50°06′10″N 005°40′14″W
- Website: www.landsendairport.co.uk

Map
- Location in Cornwall EGHC (England)

Runways
Direction	Length		Surface
Direction	m	ft	Surface
16/34	784	2,572	Asphalt
02/20	485	1,591	Grass
07/25	677	2,221	Asphalt
12/30	510	1,673	Grass

Statistics (2024)
- Passengers: 49,671
- Passenger change 2023/24: ▼8.9%
- Aircraft movements: 7,500
- Movements change 2023/24: ▲0.3%
- Sources: UK AIP at NATS; Statistics from the UK Civil Aviation Authority

Land's End Airport (Cornish: Ayrborth Pedn an Wlas) (IATA: LEQ, ICAO: EGHC), situated near St Just in Penwith, 6 miles (10 km) west of Penzance, in Cornwall, England, is the most south westerly airport of mainland Britain. The airport is owned by the Isles of Scilly Steamship Company (ISSC). ISSC's subsidiary Land's End Airport Limited operates the airport, and another subsidiary, Isles of Scilly Skybus, operates a regular passenger service to St Mary's in the Isles of Scilly as well as scenic flights around west Penwith.

The airport has a CAA Private Use Aerodrome Licence (Number P568) that allows flights for the public transport of passengers or for flying instruction for daytime use only as authorised by the licensee.

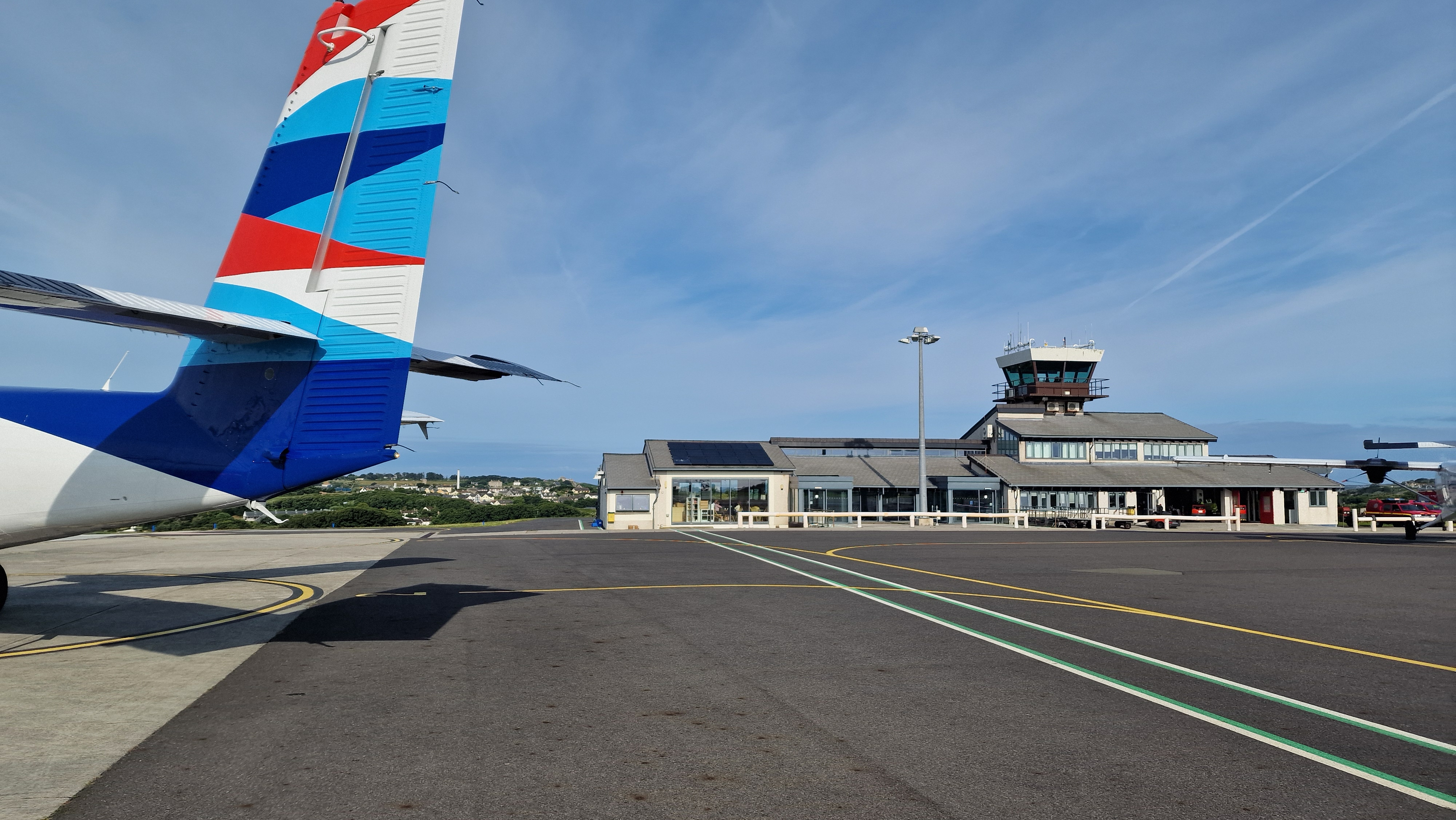
View of Land's End Airport

== History ==
Cobham Air Routes started to plan the route linking the Isles of Scilly to the mainland in 1935. Cobham was subsequently acquired by Olley Air Service, whose subsidiary Channel Air Ferries developed the Land's End airport and started a service to the island of St Mary's on 15 September 1937, flying de Havilland Dragons. A hangar was brought from Squires Gate Airport in Blackpool. On St Mary's, until its own airport opened in 1939, the planes landed on the golf course. In 1938, Great Western and Southern Airlines took over Olley Air Service and Channel Air Ferries. It continued the service throughout World War II, during which it replaced the Dragons with de Havilland Dragon Rapides.

On 1 February 1947, the airline and the service were taken over by BEA. On 2 May 1964, BEA replaced the Dragon Rapides with a single Sikorsky S-61 helicopter, operated by BEA Helicopters. On 1 September 1964, the helicopter service was moved from Land's End to the new Penzance Heliport, although BEA occasionally chartered Britten-Norman Islanders to fly from Land's End when the helicopter was unavailable.

Between 1966 and 1970, Scillonia Airways operated from the airport, flying Rapides. Westward Airways was founded at the airport in 1970, and operated a flying school there from 1971 to 2009.

In 1984, Isles of Scilly Skybus started operations at the airport, initially freight and charter, then scheduled services from April 1987, flying Islanders and de Havilland Canada DHC-6 Twin Otters. Skybus became the sole remaining air link for the Isles of Scilly from October 2012, when the helicopter service from Penzance ended.

On 9 April 2013, a new £1 million passenger terminal was officially opened. Work had begun in July 2012 and included new baggage handling and arrivals facilities and a new control tower.

On 22 August 2026, a landspout touched down southeast of St Just in Penwith, crossing into the outskirts of Runway 16 and 20, before dissipating shortly after. No known damage occurred during this time, and the airport continues to operate to this day.

== Resurfacing ==
Up to 2014, all of the airport's runways were grass. During the winters of 2012/13 and 2013/14 the airport closed for long periods when the runways became waterlogged, and flights were temporarily moved from Land's End to Newquay.

In May 2013, ISSC and the Council of the Isles of Scilly submitted a bid for finance from the European Regional Development Fund for runway resurfacing at Land's End, together with various improvements at St Mary's. In May 2014, the European Commission gave its approval. The cost of the planned asphalting at Land's End was stated to be £2.6M, for which the European fund's contribution was £1.3M.

The airport closed on 4 July 2014 for the asphalting of two runways, with Skybus flights diverted to Newquay, and it reopened on 29 July.

== Airline and destination ==
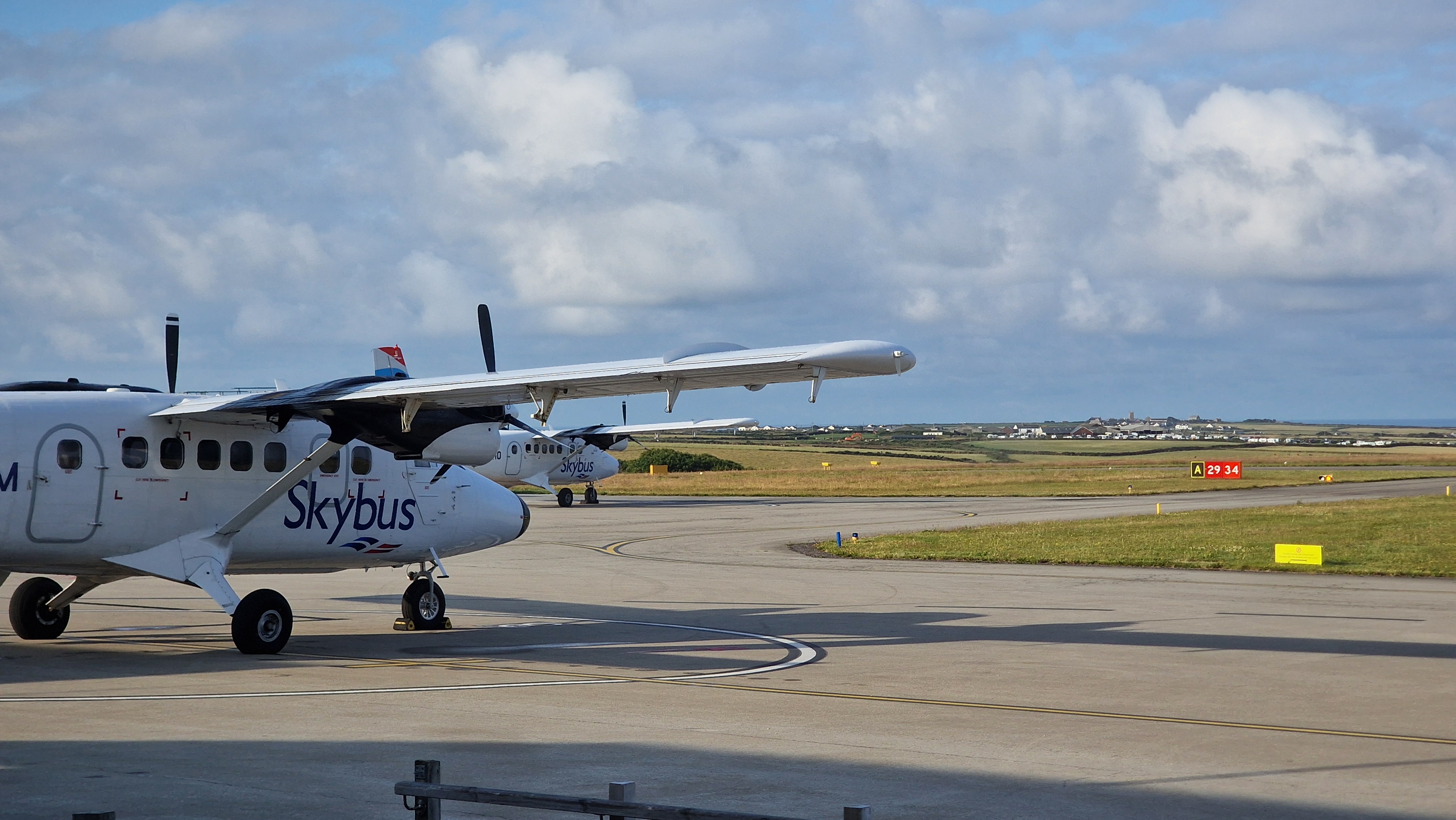
Planes getting ready in the morning for the short flight to St Mary's

Airlines	Destinations
Isles of Scilly Skybus	St Mary's

=== Other operations ===
Skybus provides scenic flights around south west Cornwall using Britten Norman Islander aircraft. Trinity House also have a depot at the airfield.

== Statistics ==
=== Passengers and aircraft movements ===
Land's End Airport Passenger totals 2015–2024 (thousands)

Traffic statistics at Land's End Airport
Year	Passengers		Aircraft		Freight	
Year	Numbers (Note: The number of domestic passengers handled)	% change	Numbers (Note: The number of all aircraft takeoffs and landings at the airport)	% change	Tonnes	% change
2015	54,169	Steady	10,425	Steady	69	Steady
2016	64,804	▲19.6	11,189	▲7.3	71	▲2.9
2017	59,386	▼8.4	10,062	▼10.1	70	▼1.4
2018	64,216	▲8.1	11,511	▲14.4	65	▼7.1
2019	64,056	▼0.2	11,177	▼2.9	71	▲9.2
2020	34,673	▼45.9	6,297	▼43.7	83	▲16.9
2021	53,211	▲53.5	7,539	▲19.7	94	▲13.3
2022	63,737	▲19.8	9,169	▲21.6	98	▲4.3
2023	54,517	▼14.4	7,475	▼18.5	83	▼15.3
2024	49,671	▼8.9	7,500	▲0.3	53	▼36.1

=== Routes ===
Busiest routes to and from Land's End (2023)
Rank	Airport	Total passengers	Change 2022/23
1	St Mary's	n/a	Steady
2	Exeter	99	▲106.3%
3	Newquay	52	▲550.0%

== Transport connections ==
Skybus operate a shuttle bus from Penzance railway station to the airport. It is possible to book combined rail and air tickets.
