= British Airways Helicopters Flight 5918 =

Accident in the southern Celtic Sea

- Oscar November being recovered from the sea

Accident
- Date: 16 July 1983
- Summary: Pilot error in poor visibility
- Site: Sea near St Mary's Aerodrome, Isles of Scilly; 49°55.4′N 6°14.9′W

Aircraft
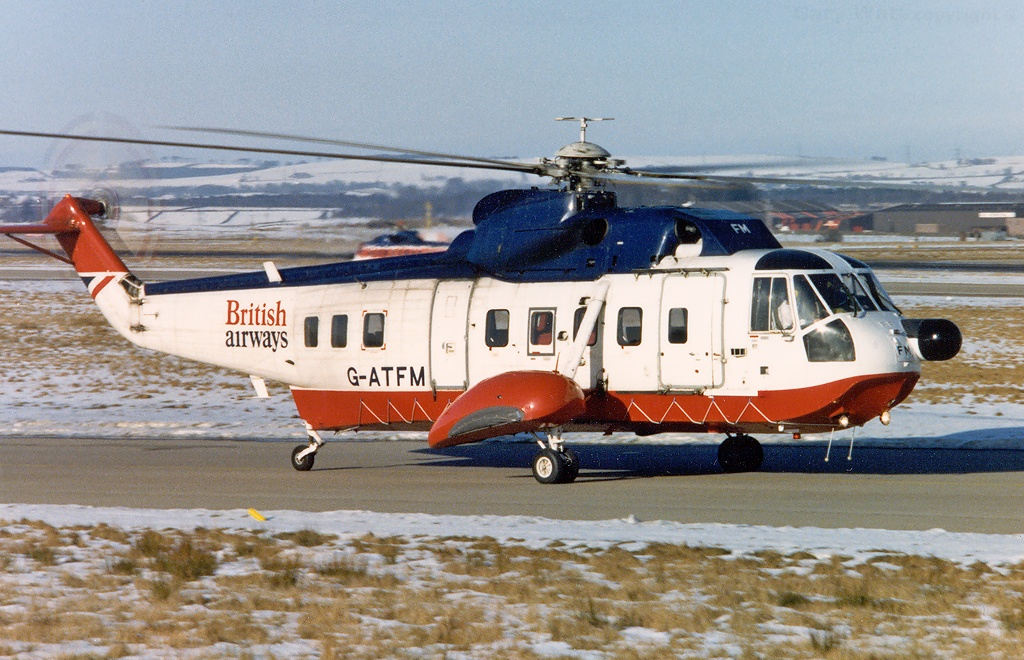
- A British Airways Helicopters Sikorsky S-61N similar to the aircraft involved
- Aircraft type: Sikorsky S-61N
- Operator: British Airways Helicopters
- Registration: G-BEON
- Flight origin: Penzance Heliport
- Destination: St Mary's Aerodrome, Isles of Scilly
- Occupants: 26
- Passengers: 23
- Crew: 3
- Fatalities: 20
- Survivors: 6

On 16 July 1983, British Airways Helicopters Flight 5918, a British Airways Helicopters commercial Sikorsky S-61 helicopter, Oscar November (G-BEON), crashed in the southern Celtic Sea, in the Atlantic Ocean, while en route from Penzance to St Mary's, Isles of Scilly in poor visibility. Only six of the twenty-six people on board survived. It was Britain's worst civil aviation helicopter accident at the time.

An investigation was promptly carried out by the Accidents Investigation Branch (AIB), though calls for a public inquiry were dismissed. The AIB found that the accident was caused by pilot error, in failing to notice and correct an unintentional descent when attempting to fly at low altitude in poor visibility. Other contributory factors were found to be a failure to monitor flight instruments adequately, and a lack of audio height warning equipment.

The crash sparked a review of helicopter safety, and eight recommendations were made by the AIB. Of these, seven were adopted, most notably that it was mandatory for there to be audible height warnings on passenger helicopters operating off-shore. It remained the worst British civilian helicopter accident until 1986, when the Boeing 234LR Chinook helicopter G-BWFC crashed in the North Sea, with 45 fatalities.

== Background ==
The Sikorsky S-61N helicopter Oscar November (registered G-BEON) was owned by British Airways Helicopters, configured to seat 24 passengers, and typically operated between Aberdeen and the oil platforms of the North Sea. On 24 June 1983, Oscar November was assigned to act as a replacement for the British Airways Helicopters commercial passenger service between Penzance and the Isles of Scilly. The helicopter that usually operated the service, a Sikorsky S-61NM fitted with 32 passenger seats, was out of action while it was being repaired. On 3 July 1983, Oscar November received its annual certificate of airworthiness. Manufactured in 1977, Oscar November's airframe had flown a total of 7,904 hours, 49 of which had been since the last certificate of airworthiness.

The crew consisted of pilots Captain Dominic Lawlor (37 years old) and Captain Neil Charleton (30), along with cabin attendant Robin Lander (22). Lawlor was designated as the commander for the flight, while Charleton acted as co-pilot. Lawlor had flown a total of 3,970 pilot hours prior to the flight, of which 2,820 had been in an S-61N helicopter, and although he was based in Aberdeen, he had flown the Penzance–St Mary's route over 50 times before. Charleton was based in Beccles, but had also flown the route before, over 100 times. He had a total of 3,737 pilot hours, of which 2,280 had been in an S-61N. The 20-minute Penzance–St Mary's route was flown regularly during the summer; with 12 scheduled return flights running six days a week.

== Flight ==
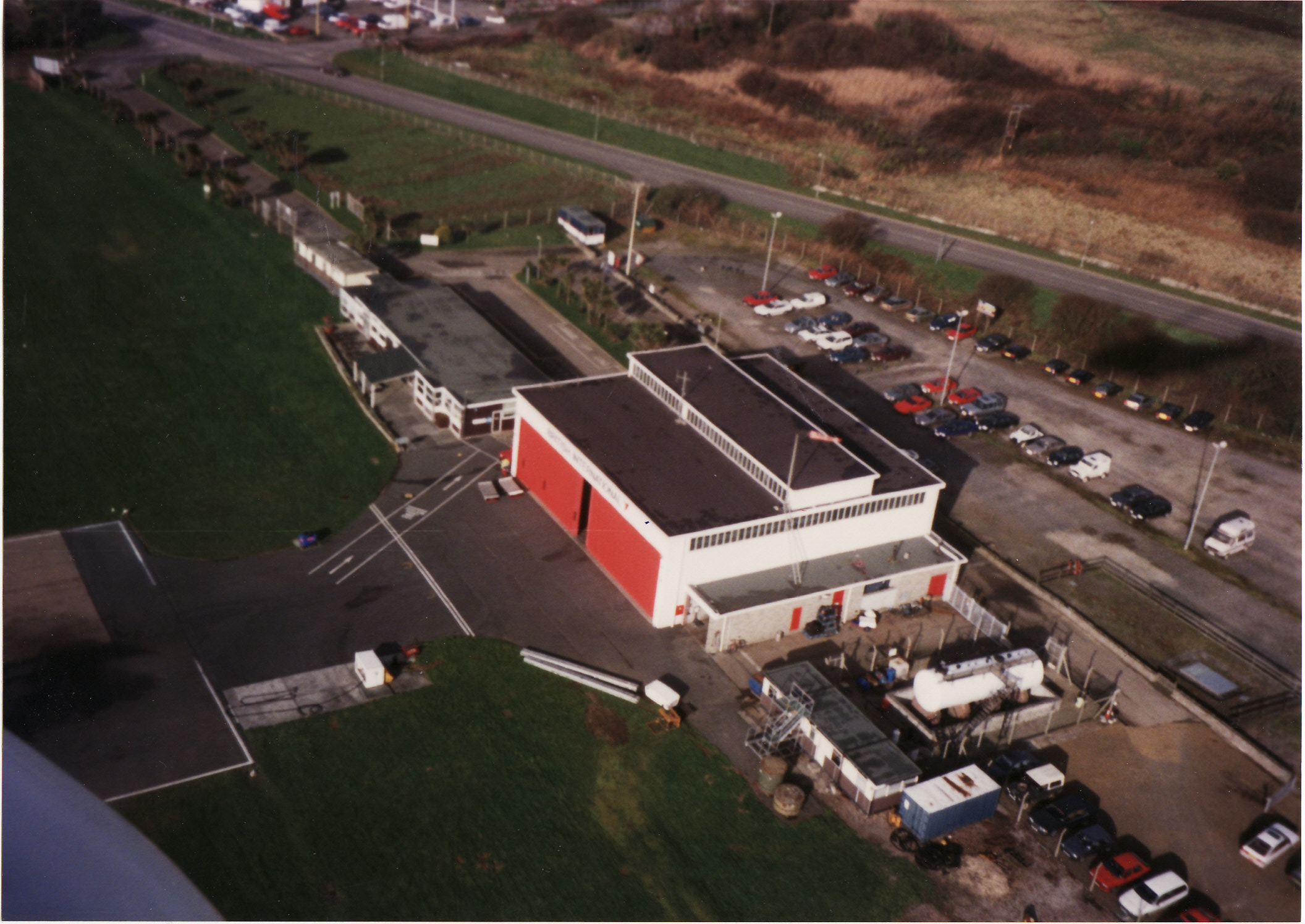
Penzance Heliport, from which the flight departed.

Oscar November was one of two flights scheduled to fly from Penzance Heliport to St Mary's Airport on the Isles of Scilly on the morning of 16 July; the other was G-BDDA (Delta Alpha), another S-61 helicopter. Delta Alpha had been scheduled to depart at 7:50 am (GMT), (Note: All times given are in Greenwich Mean Time (GMT).) while Oscar November was due to leave at 8:15 am, but both flights were delayed by poor visibility. The weather forecast from the Plymouth Meteorological Office that morning warned of fog from 7:00 am until 5:00 pm, with visibility typically between 1–4 kilometres (0.62–2.49 mi), but as low as 100 metres (330 ft) in fog banks. The actual visibility recorded at St Mary's Aerodrome increased from 1.2 kilometres (0.75 mi) at 9:30 am to 2.2 kilometres (1.4 mi) by 11:30 am. Delta Alpha departed at 10:46 am, and landed at St Mary's at 11:06 am. With the possibility of the weather worsening, Lawlor waited for confirmation that Delta Alpha had landed and flown the entire journey according to visual flight rules (VFR). The minimum requirements to conduct a VFR flight were 900 metres (3,000 ft) of visibility, with a cloud ceiling of 200 feet (61 m). Having received confirmation, Oscar November departed Penzance at roughly 11:10 am, with 23 passengers on board, on flight BA 5918.

Oscar November climbed to a height of 2,000 feet (610 m), and as they passed by Longships Lighthouse, about 1.25 miles (2.0 km) off the coast of Land's End, the visibility was recorded as being between 0.5 and 0.75 nautical miles (0.93 and 1.39 km; 0.58 and 0.86 mi). During the investigation into the crash, Lawlor and Charleton reported that they received a verbal weather report from the crew of Delta Alpha, who were passing on their return flight. According to the pair, they were told that visibility was 0.5 to 0.75 nautical miles (0.93 to 1.39 km; 0.58 to 0.86 mi) at 300 feet (91 m). However, the crew of Delta Alpha did not recall talking to the Oscar November crew at any time during their flight. Based on this information, which he interpreted to mean that the cloud base was at 300 feet, Lawlor descended to 500 feet (150 m), to be able to analyse the situation better on their approach. For his part, Charleton had interpreted the message differently, believing that 300 feet had referred to the height at which Delta Alpha had been when they made the observations, but the pair did not discuss the report.

At 11:30 am, Charleton communicated with St Mary's, indicating that they were level at 500 feet, and were halfway through their crossing. They maintained good visibility with the sea below them, and although haze limited their forward visibility so that they could not see the horizon, they were confident it was in excess of the VFR minimum of 900 metres. Roughly 6 nautical miles (11 km; 6.9 mi) from St Mary's, Lawlor began to descend to 250 feet (76 m), the minimum height permitted, as he expected the cloud base to be at 300 feet. Both pilots confirmed with their instruments when that height had been attained, and thereafter Charleton concentrated on his radar and communicating with St Mary's. Lawlor then reduced speed, during which the vertical gyro indicator gave a brief warning of an attitude failure; however Lawlor checked the instruments, which appeared normal. Confident that the weather had improved, Lawlor stopped monitoring his instruments, and flew by visual aids only.

=== Crash ===
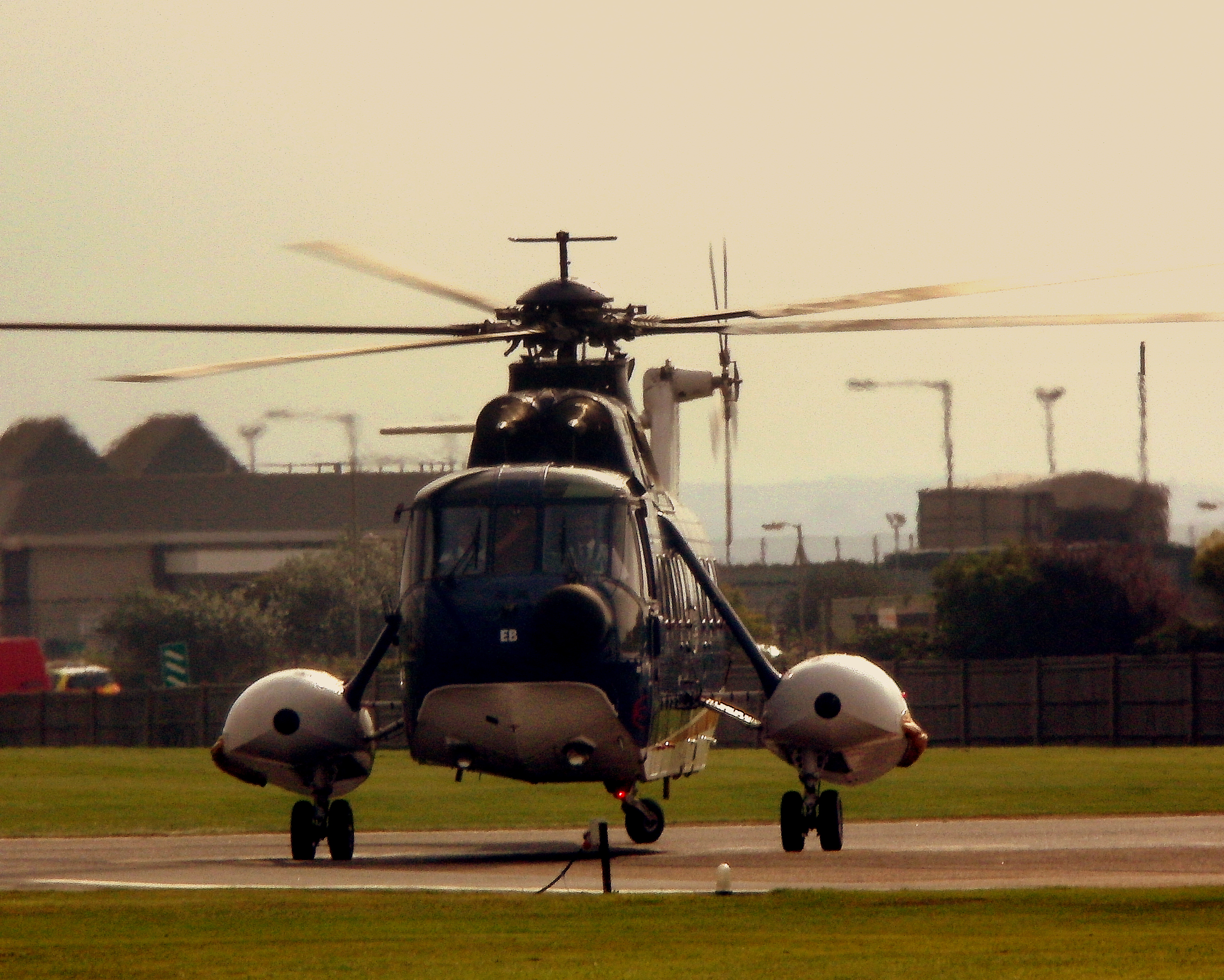
A Sikorsky S-61 helicopter, with the sponsons clearly visible on either side. During Oscar November's crash, these were broken off.

At roughly 11:35 am, following a string of communication between Charleton and St Mary's, the last message was sent from the aerodrome; "Oscar November is clear to land 300 degrees at 5 knots." When Oscar November was roughly 1.5 nautical miles (2.8 km; 1.7 mi) from the coast, the helicopter crashed, hitting the sea three successive times. Both Lawlor and Charleton thought that the aircraft was still at 250 feet, though one of the passengers, Lucille Langley-Williams, said that the cabin attendant had told her they were flying at around 100 feet (30 m) shortly before the crash. The Sikorsky S-61 was fitted with floats on either side, known as "sponsons", and the base was designed to be like the hull of a boat, so that the helicopter could float. However, the heavy impact broke both sponsons off and broke the floor, letting water into the helicopter. Lacking the stability that the sponsons would provide, the fuselage rolled over, letting water in even quicker, and sank.

Only 6 of the 26 people on board escaped from the helicopter; Lawlor exited through the emergency exit window by his seat, while Charleton and a child got out through the forward freight bay. Another child managed to escape via the rear freight bay, and two adults exited through the starboard airstairs door. In addition to the two pilots, the survivors were Howard Goddard (age 12), Ellen Hanslow (15), Lucille Langley-Williams and Megan Smith (both 60). Ellen spotted Goddard struggling in the water, and she swam to help him. None of the six had managed to retrieve a life jacket, and so the two pilots gathered the survivors together, and helped keep them afloat, using suitcases as flotation aids. The incident was the worst civilian helicopter crash in the United Kingdom since 1981, when eleven oil workers and both pilots died in the 1981 Bristow Helicopters Westland Wessex crash.

=== Rescue ===
Roughly ten minutes after the last communication between Oscar November and air traffic control at St Mary's, air traffic control requested that the St Mary's lifeboat be launched. Shortly thereafter, they also contacted RNAS Culdrose that Oscar November was overdue, and requested that the search and rescue helicopters be put on stand-by. The lifeboat, RNLB Robert Edgar, launched around midday, around the same time as the search and rescue helicopter was scrambled from Culdrose. The Navy's Westland Wessex helicopter arrived at the accident site first, but lacking sufficient information to pinpoint the crash location, and with fog banks still around, the pilot landed at St Mary's for more information. Langley-Williams said that at one point, the helicopter had been right above them, but unable to see them in the fog.

Around this time, the Robert Edgar arrived at the accident site, which it was able to identify by the smell of aircraft fuel. The lifeboat crew spotted and rescued the six survivors, who had been in the water for around an hour, and began looking for any others. A second Navy helicopter, a Westland Sea King, arrived around 1:00 pm and was directed to the crash site by flares from the lifeboat, which returned to St Mary's with the survivors not long after. The crew of the Sea King helicopter spotted the sponsons floating in the water and dispatched a diver, who was later joined by the diver from the Wessex helicopter. The Wessex collected one of the survivors from St Mary's and transported her to Treliske Hospital in Truro. At 3:25 pm, both divers were picked up from the water, and the Navy abandoned their search; the Sea King returned to Culdrose. David Harris, the Member of Parliament (MP) for St Ives, the constituency which contained both Penzance and the Isles of Scilly, praised the rescue, singling out Matt Lethbridge, the coxswain of the St Mary's lifeboat for particular commendation.

== Recovery ==
On the evening of the crash, the MV Seaforth Clansman, a Royal Navy charter in Naval Party 1007, sailed from Falmouth with a crew of divers, arriving at the site that the survivors had been picked up at 10:10 pm. The following morning, two inspectors from the Accidents Investigation Branch arrived with acoustic detectors that would allow them to locate the helicopter wreckage using its underwater locator beacon. It took until 6:00 pm that evening to get an accurate position for the helicopter, but sea conditions meant that they could not commence diving until early the following morning. The divers located the helicopter fuselage at 9:10 pm. The fuselage was lying on its side on the seabed, 200 ft (60 m) below the surface on a steep dune.

At around 12:00 pm on 19 July, the helicopter was lifted out of the sea and onto Seaforth Clansman's deck. Bodies of only 17 of the 20 missing people were found in the wreckage; 2 passengers and Lander, the cabin attendant, were not recovered. The Seaforth Clansman and the Penlee lifeboat RNLB Mabel Alice brought the wreckage and the bodies to Penzance.

The aircraft had lost its nose-cone and sponsons. The starboard sponson was damaged but retained its capacity to float; the port was undamaged and failed to float. Three of the five main blades had been sheared off, along with the rear rotor blades. The cabin was badly damaged. The port-side escape windows were missing.

== Investigation ==
Two days after the incident, during a discussion in Parliament, Robert Hughes, Labour MP for Aberdeen North, called for a public inquiry into the safety record of Sikorsky helicopters, citing that there had been over 400 "notifiable occurrences" involving the Sikorsky S-61. The Secretary of State for Transport, Tom King, referred to the previous excellent safety record of the helicopter, which had not been involved in a fatal incident in the United Kingdom for ten years, and said that he had full confidence in the Accidents Investigation Branch investigation. From Penzance, the fuselage was transported by road to the Accidents Investigation Branch at Farnborough, Hampshire for investigation. An article in The Times initial speculated that the helicopter could have flown into a flock of seagulls, after mutilated bird corpses were found near the scene, or suffered a mechanical failure. Lynda King Taylor, a reporter who flew over to the Isles of Scilly around the same time as the crash reported that on her British Airways Helicopters flight there had been a number of safety shortcomings; her passenger ticket did not have her name on it, the safety announcement was inaudible amid the noise generated by the helicopter, there was no safety leaflet at her seat, passengers were allowed to walk around the helicopter even when the seatbelt sign was illuminated, and the locations of the emergency exits were not highlighted to passengers. These issues were contested by British Airways Helicopters, and along with the theories about the seagulls and a mechanical failure, none were found to have caused the crash or the high loss of life in the Accidents Investigation Branch report. The preliminary report was published by the AIB on 4 August 1983, and the final report was released in March 1985.

=== Cause ===
The AIB investigation was carried out by one of their investigators, D. A. Cooper. He concluded that the helicopter was mechanically fine, and that the accident had been a collision during "controlled flight", rather than a ditching. (Note: Ditching is the term given to a deliberate crash-landing of an aeroplane or helicopter on the sea.) He found that the cause was pilot error, specifically that Lawlor did not notice and remedy an "unintentional descent" while intending to fly at 250 feet (76 m). The report noted that Lawlor was attempting to fly by visual reference while the visibility was both "poor and deceptive", though within the relevant guidelines. Cooper noted that the weather conditions were unsuitable for visual flight, and listed the minimum guidelines for visual flight in the operating procedures as a contributory factor in the crash, along with too little monitoring of flight instruments and a lack of an audio altitude warning. During the coroner's inquest, Lawlor admitted that he was partly to blame for the crash, admitting that his piloting "undoubtedly did play a part in the accident".

Twenty months before the flight, the British Airline Pilots' Association had recommended to the Civil Aviation Authority that weather minima for visual flights were unsatisfactory, but the recommendations were still being reviewed at the time of the flight. The minima listed in the British Airways Helicopters operating manual were similar to other helicopter operators, though Cooper noted that too much discretion was allowed to the flight crew regarding how much they monitored flight instruments during a visual flight.

== Legacy ==
The Accident Investigation Branch made eight recommendations. The main recommendation from the report was for an audible height warning on passenger helicopters operating off-shore and for the altimeter to be moved nearer to the pilot's 'head-up field of vision'. Ground proximity warning systems had been made compulsory on passenger planes in 1977. The United Kingdom Civil Aviation Authority made it mandatory that audible ground proximity warning systems had to be installed in all passenger helicopters by August 1985. It was also recommended that the strength of both the passenger and attendant seats should be improved. All of the twin seats inside Oscar November sheared off, while the single seats remained fixed. The report suggested the weather minima for visual flight, and the related crew instrument monitoring procedures should be reviewed for helicopter flight, along with the specific altimeter and minimum runway visual range (distance a pilot can see while approaching a runway) rules for the Penzance–St Mary's route. In order to aid rescue efforts, it was further recommended that helicopters being used for public transport should be fitted with an automatically deployable survival radio beacon, and the pilots should wear lifejackets with dual frequency personal locator beacons.

The crash remained the deadliest helicopter incident in the United Kingdom until 1986, when a British International Helicopters Chinook crashed on approach to land at Sumburgh Airport in the Shetland Islands, killing 43 passengers and two crew members.

== See also ==
- 1986 British International Helicopters Chinook crash
- Aviation accidents and incidents

== Bibliography ==
- Cooper, DA (30 January 1985). Report on the accident to British Airways Helicopters Sikorsky S-61N, G-BEON in the sea near St Mary's aerodrome, Isles of Scilly (PDF) (Report). London: Air Accidents Investigation Branch, Her Majesty's Stationery Office.
