= Sikorsky S-61 =

Series of civil transport helicopters

S-61L/S-61N
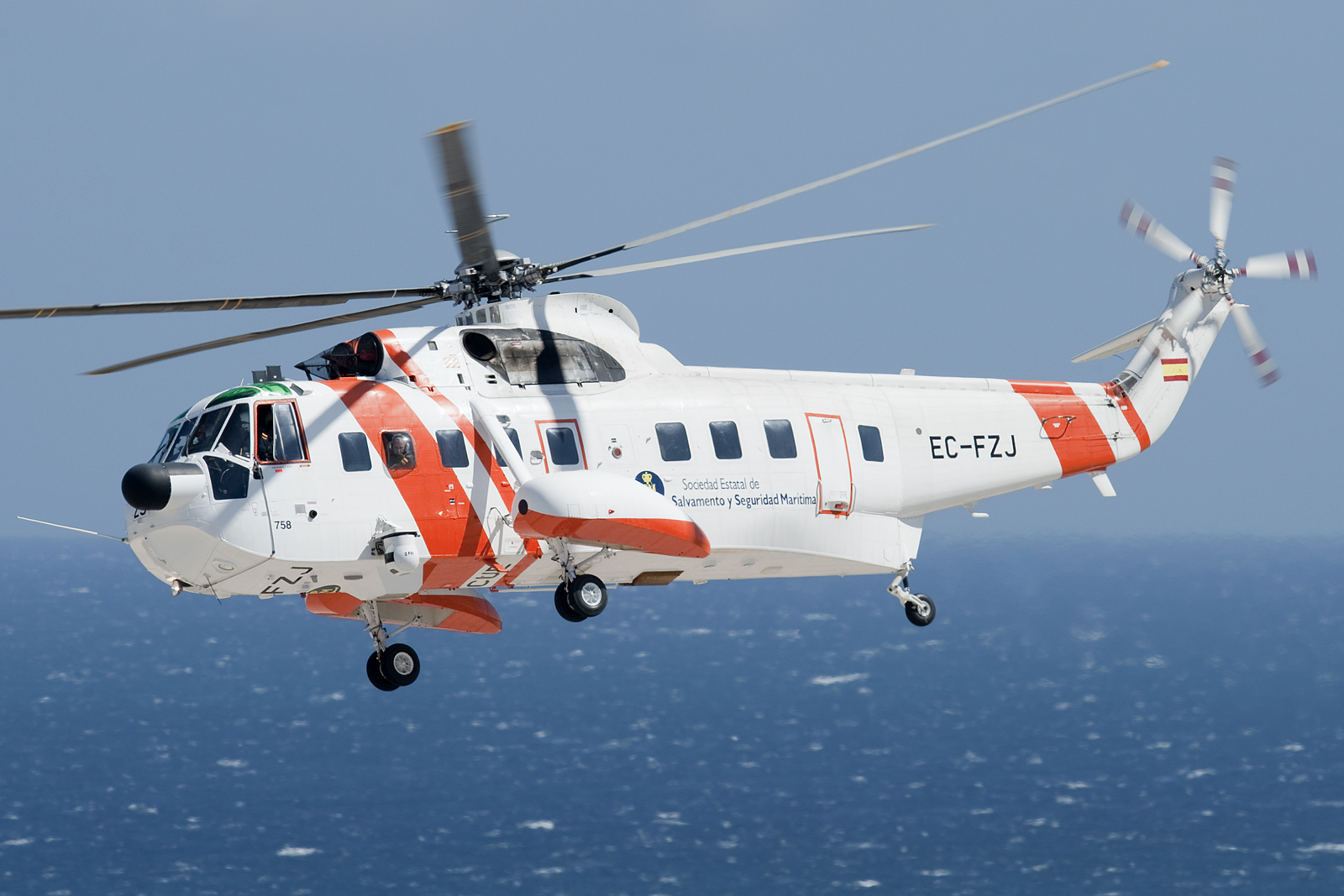
- A S-61N Mk.II operating for Sociedad de Salvamento y Seguridad Marítima in Spain

General information
- Type: Medium-lift transport / airliner helicopter
- Manufacturer: Sikorsky Aircraft
- Status: In active service
- Primary users: CHC Helicopter Bristow Helicopters; AAR Airlift
- Number built: 119

History
- Introduction date: 1962
- First flight: 2 November 1961
- Developed from: Sikorsky SH-3 Sea King

The Sikorsky S-61L and S-61N are civil variants of the SH-3 Sea King military helicopter. They were developed and produced by the American helicopter manufacturer Sikorsky Aircraft.

The commercial version of the Sea King was developed during the late 1950s. Two versions, the land-based S-61L and the amphibious S-61N, were created. The S-61L had an enlarged cabin and dispensed with some amphibious features, such as its float stabilizers, for greater payload capacity. It was considered attractive to utility operators, while the amphibious S-61N appealed to offshore operators. The first models were delivered to customers in September 1961. By the turn of the century, they had become two of the most widely used airliners and oil rig support helicopters built.

Airliners were a key customer for the S-61L. Los Angeles Airways, New York Airways, and Chicago Helicopter Airways were among the first operators. However, operations in this sector proved troublesome, with profits elusive and service often subject to noise complaints and accidents. S-61s also saw service in various search and rescue (SAR) sectors. Third-party companies have often converted individual airframes by shortening the fuselage to bolster their lift capacity. Governmental organizations have procured the S-61: the United States Department of State was a prominent operator of the type into the twenty-first century.

== Design and development ==
=== Background ===
In September 1957, Sikorsky was awarded a United States Navy development contract for an amphibious anti-submarine warfare (ASW) helicopter capable of detecting and attacking submarines. On 11 March 1959, the XHSS-2 Sea King prototype made its maiden flight. Production deliveries of the HSS-2 (later designated SH-3A) commenced during September 1961. The initial production aircraft was powered by a pair of General Electric T58-GE-8B turboshaft engines, each capable of providing up to 1,250 shp (930 kW).

Sikorsky quickly decided to pursue the development of a dedicated commercial model of the Sea King. Two prime models were produced: the land-based S-61L and the amphibious S-61N. On 2 November 1961, the S-61L conducted its maiden flight; it was 4 ft 3 in (1.30 m) longer than the HSS-2 to facilitate the carriage of a substantial payload of freight or passengers. Initial production S-61Ls were powered by two 1,350 shp (1,010 kW) GE CT58-110 turboshafts, the civil version of the T58. The S-61L features a modified landing gear that eliminates the float stabilisers.

On 7 August 1962, the S-61N performed its first flight. Being otherwise identical to the S-61L, this version is optimized for overwater operations, particularly oil rig support, by retaining the SH-3's floats. Both the S-61L and S-61N were subsequently updated to the Mk II standard, which was outfitted with more powerful CT58-140 engines that provided superior performance in hot and high conditions, along with incorporating measures to dampen vibration and various other refinements.

=== Further development ===
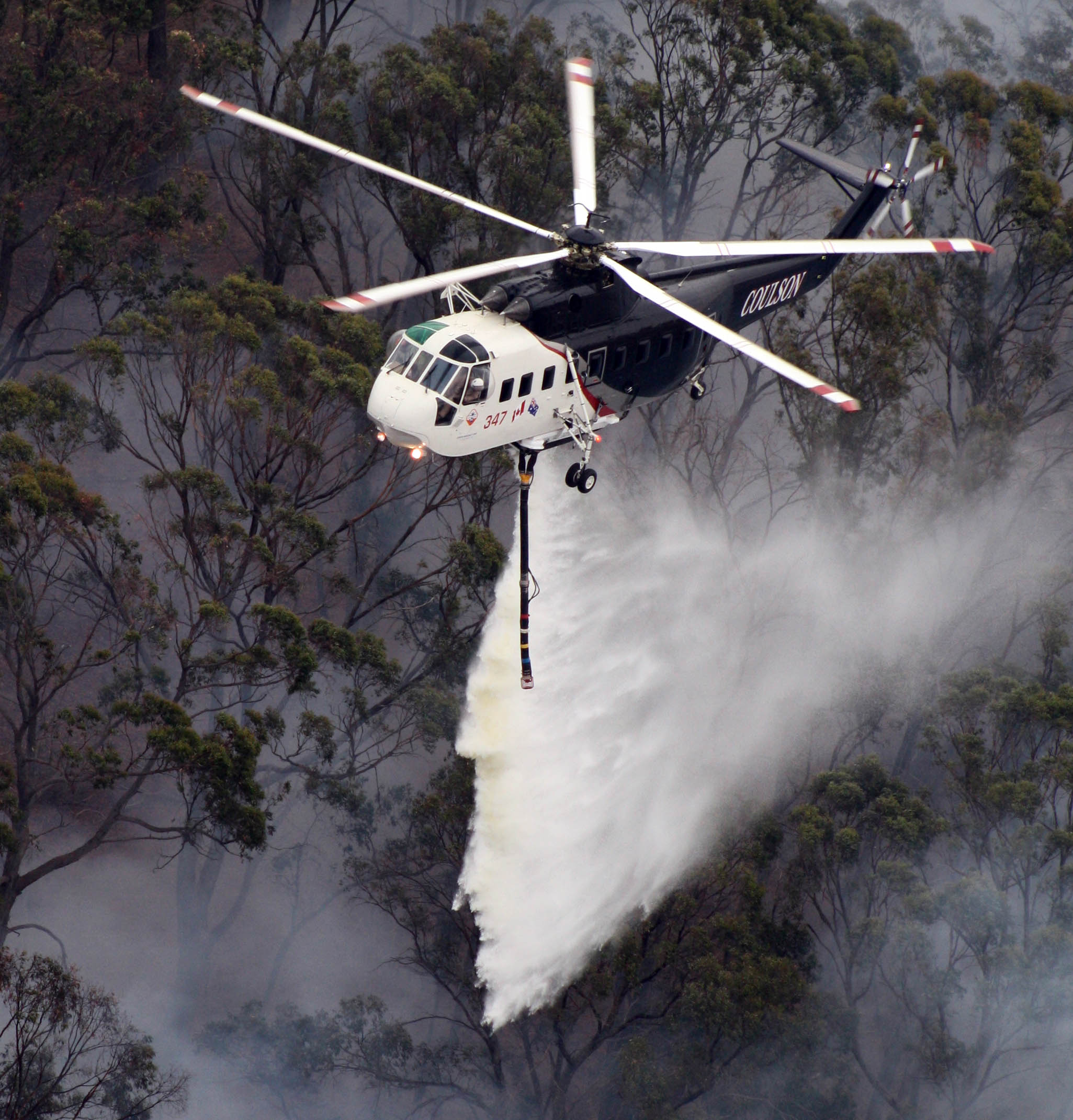
A Coulson Aircrane S-61L dropping water during the Australian bushfire season.

Additional civil models of the S-61 would soon be developed. The Payloader, a stripped-down version optimized for aerial crane work, was the third civil model of the S-61 produced. The Payloader features the fixed undercarriage of the S-61L, but with an empty weight almost 2,000 lb (910 kg) less than the standard S-61N.

Carson Helicopters was the first company to shorten a commercial S-61. The fuselage is shortened by 50 in (1.3 m) to increase its single-engine performance and external payload. The improved lift performance lent itself to utility operations, particularly in the construction market.

A unique version is the S-61 Shortsky, a conversion of S-61Ls and S-61Ns performed by Helipro International. VIH Logging was the launch customer for HeliPro's Shortsky, which conducted its first flight during February 1996.

One modification for the S-61 is the Carson Composite Main Rotor Blade. These blades replace the original Sikorsky metal blades, which are prone to fatigue, and permit a modified aircraft to carry an additional 2,000 lb (910 kg) load, fly 15 kn (28 km/h) faster and increase range 61 nmi (113 km).

During the 2000s, the S-61T modernisation emerged. This model includes composite main rotor blades, a modular wiring harness, and (optionally) a glass cockpit; these changes reportedly boost the helicopter's lift capability and increase its speed. In June 2010, the United States Department of State signed a purchase agreement for 110 modernized S-61Ts, which will perform passenger and cargo transport missions to support its worldwide operations.

== Operational history ==
Newsreel of an S-61N performing an emergency water landing

The first civil operator to adopt the S-61 was Los Angeles Airways, which introduced the type to service on 11 March 1962. The company had reportedly bought them from Sikorsky at a unit price of $650,000 each. Sikorsky's foremost competitor in sales was Boeing Vertol, which had a Vertol 107 twin-rotor helicopter, which arrived on the market shortly after the S-61. While regarded as one of the most successful American scheduled helicopter airlines even by the 21st century, following several accidents involving its S-61s, including the crash of the prototype S-61 N300Y, Los Angeles Airways ceased operations in 1971.

Even before the receipt of approval from the Federal Aviation Administration (FAA), the S-61 had been purchased by several airliners, including Los Angeles Airways, New York Airways, and Chicago Helicopter Airways. It was promoted as the first U.S. helicopter explicitly designed as a commercial airliner. The S-61 seated 25 passengers with an estimated direct operating cost of 8¢ per seat mile. The operating costs of civil helicopters were considered crucial, even before the S-61's introduction, as airlines had typically been unable to achieve profitable helicopter routes and became dependent on government subsidies to operate, reportedly due to the limited capacity and high operating expense of the available helicopters. It was hoped that the S-61 would noticeably improve on economics compared to its predecessors.

New York Airways ordered a batch of ten S-61s to serve its helicopter routes. Perhaps most prominently, it started operating flights from a heliport on the 59-story Pan Am Building, and at one point planned to perform as many as 360 helicopter flights per day. Launched on 21 December 1965, the operation soon proved unprofitable, carrying an average of only eight passengers, leading to the heliport's closure in 1968. While flights were resumed during February 1977, an accident three months later involving an S-61 helicopter that collapsed and flipped onto its side, killing five people, led to the heliport being closed indefinitely. Two years later, New York Airlines ended helicopter operations.

From 1962 to 1966, Pakistan International Airlines (PIA) operated its Sikorsky S-61 helicopters for services within East Pakistan Helicopter Service (present day Bangladesh) using four S-61s. The helicopter route to Khulna reduced the 21-hour journey overland to 37 minutes by air. 20 towns and cities covered by the network, including Bogra, Sirajganj, Chittagong, Mongla, Kushtia, Barisal, Chandpur, Sandwip and Hatiya Upazila. The average price of a ticket was 25 rupees. It was the world's largest commercial helicopter network at the time.

Between 1978 and 1986, an S-61 was used for an Airlink service between the London airports of Heathrow and Gatwick over a distance of 42 miles (68 km); it was operated jointly by British Caledonian Airways and British Airways Helicopters in partnership with the British Airports Authority (BAA). While the operation proved valuable before the opening of the M25 motorway, its noise led to it being controversial, the route overflying several densely populated areas of London. Initially, the Civil Aviation Authority banned flights between 9:15 pm and 6:30 am to limit its impact, but the whole service came to an end after its licence to operate was revoked by the Transport Secretary on 6 February 1986. Numerous S-61s were also operated on other routes in Britain, often between the mainland and offshore locations such as the Channel Islands, the Scilly Islands, and various oil rigs in the North Sea.

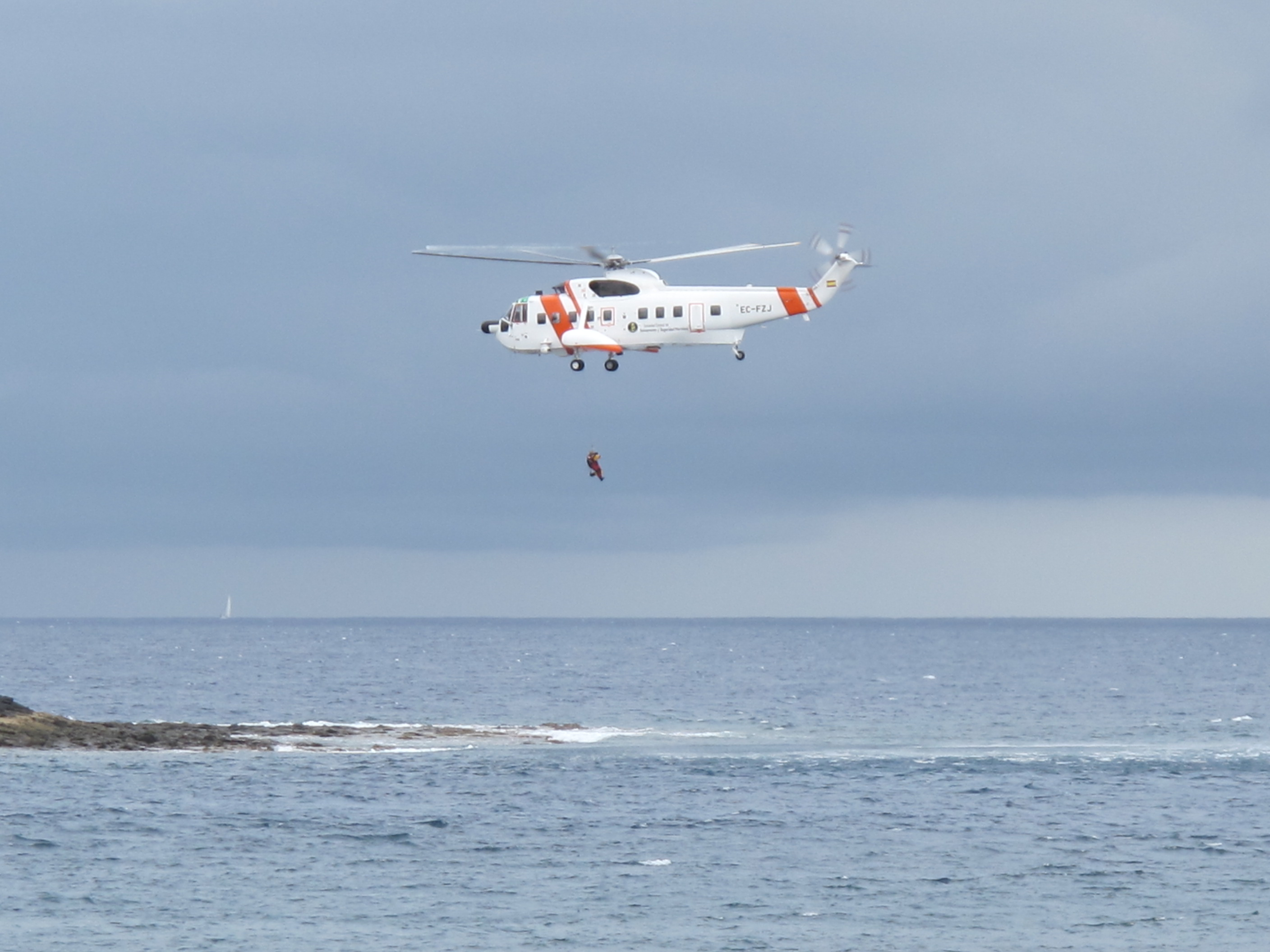
S-61N during a SAR operation

The British operator Bristow Helicopters operated several S-61s; they performed search and rescue (SAR) operations from civilian bases at Stornoway, Sumburgh, Lee-on-Solent, and Portland between 1983 and 2007. Between 1991 and 2013, the Irish Coast Guard operated its own S-61s for SAR operations.

Various government organisations have also adopted the S-61. During the 2010s, the United States Department of State procured in excess of 100 S-61Ts in support of its worldwide operations. These rotorcraft have been operated in Iraq and Afghanistan, amongst other locations.

== Variants ==
S-61L
Non-amphibious civil transport version. It seats up to 30 passengers.
S-61L Mk II
Improved version of the S-61L, cabin equipped with cargo bins.
S-61N
Amphibious civil transport version.
S-61N Mk II
Improved version of the S-61N.
S-61NM
An L model in an N configuration.
S-61T Triton
A modernized upgrade was performed by Sikorsky and Carson Helicopters. Upgrades include composite main rotor blades, full airframe structural refurbishment, conversion of folding rotor head to non-folding, new modular wiring harness, and Cobham-supplied glass cockpit avionics. Initial models converted were S-61N.
AS-61N-1 Silver
A license-built model of the S-61N by Agusta, with a shortened cabin.

== Operators ==
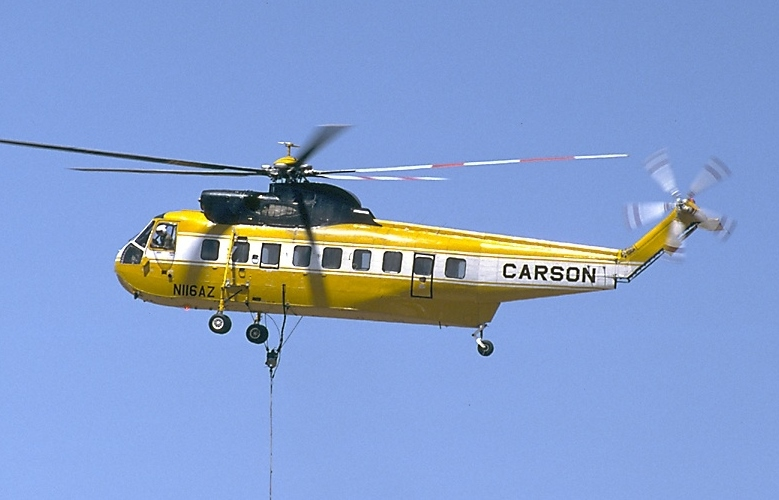
A Carson Helicopters Sikorsky S-61N

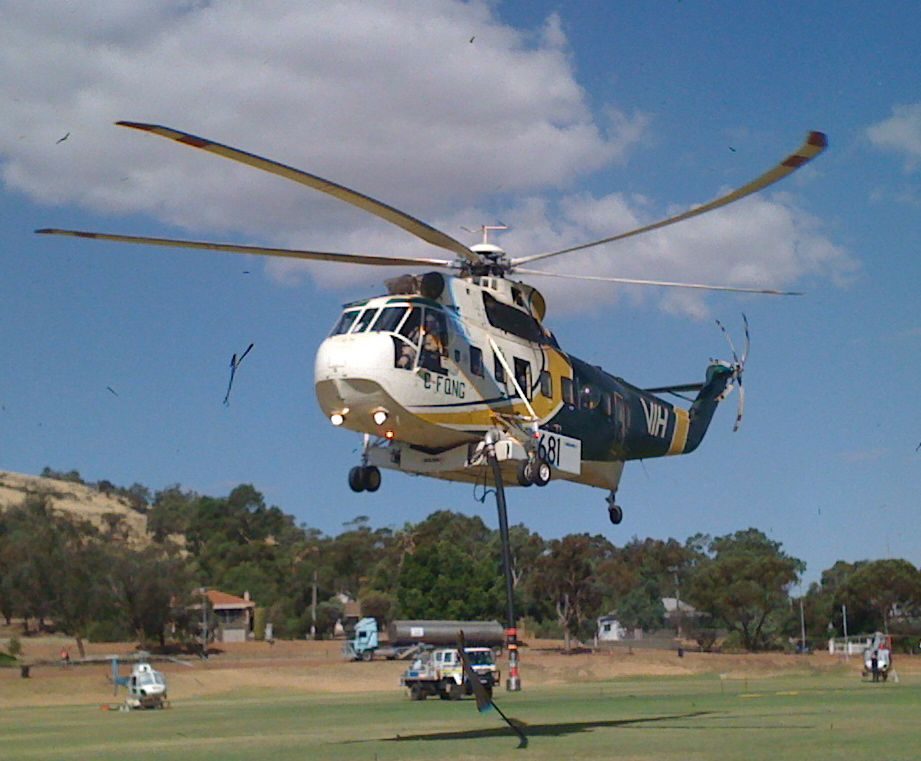
A Helitanker S-61N, December 2009

Canada

- CHC Helicopter
- Cougar Helicopters

Greenland

- Air Greenland
- Bristow Helicopters

Spain

- Sociedad de Salvamento y Seguridad Marítima

Indonesia

- National Agency for Disaster Countermeasure

United States

- AAR Corp
- Carson Helicopters
- CHI Aviation
- Helimax Aviation
- Croman Corporation
- Helicopter Transport Services
- United States Department of State

=== Former operators ===
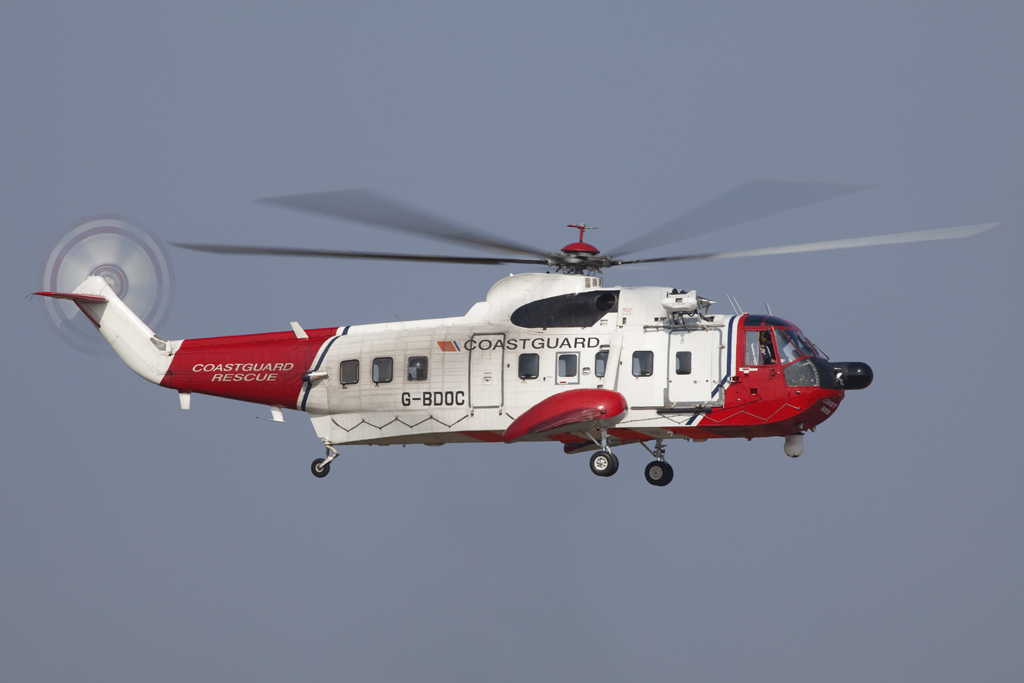
A Netherlands Coastguard S-61N operated by Bristow Helicopters

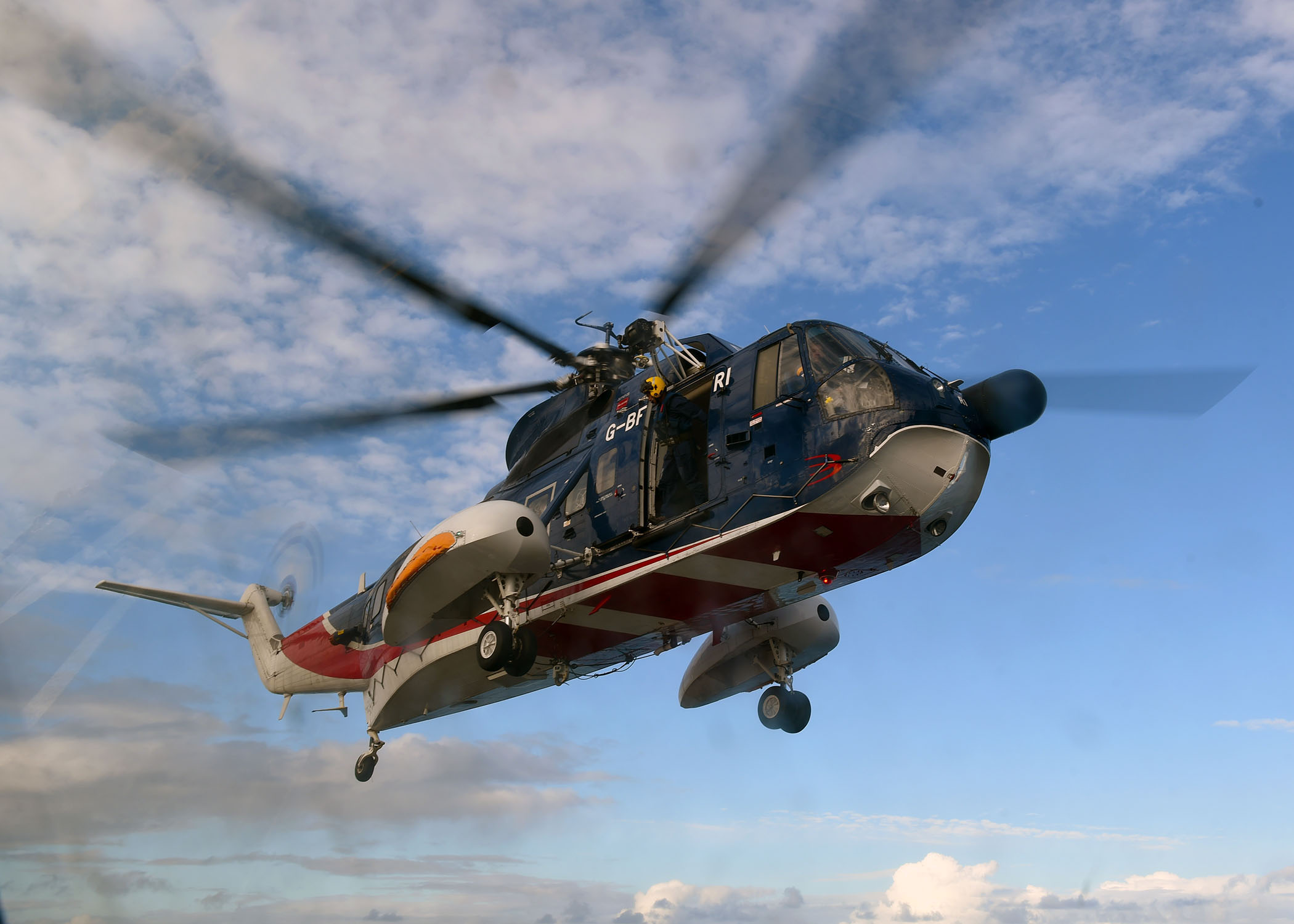
A British International Helicopter S-61N lands aboard the USS Vicksburg

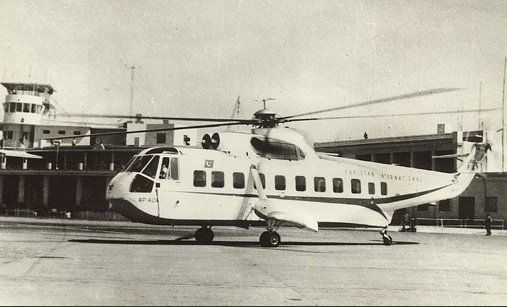
Pakistan International Airlines S-61 in Karachi.

Argentina

- Argentine Air Force

Brunei

- Brunei Shell Petroleum

Canada

- Canadian Coast Guard

Indonesia

- Indonesian Air Force - S-61V

Ireland

- Irish Air Corps
- Irish Coast Guard

Lebanon

- Lebanese Air Force

Netherlands

- KLM Helikopters

Norway

- Helikopter Service A/S

Pakistan

- Pakistan International Airlines

United Kingdom

- British Airways Helicopters
- British Caledonian Helicopters
- British International Helicopters
- Her Majesty's Coastguard

United States

- Los Angeles Airways
- New York Airways
- San Francisco and Oakland Helicopter Airlines

== Notable accidents ==
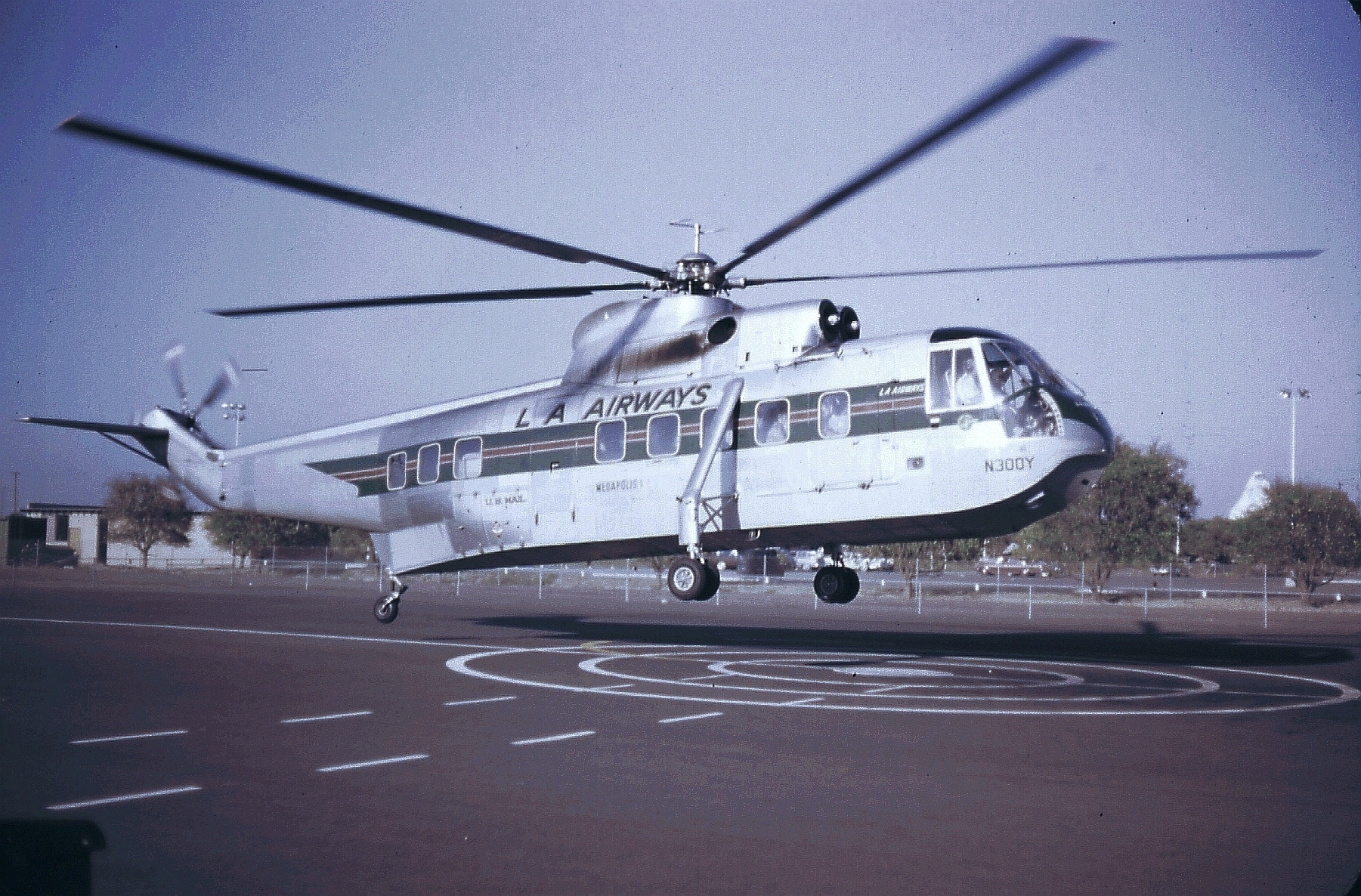
N300Y, the Los Angeles Airways prototype of the Sikorsky S-61L Helicopter, lifting off from the Disneyland Heliport

1960s

- On 2 February 1966, Pakistan International Airlines Flight 17, operated by a Sikorsky S-61 helicopter registration AP-AOC, crashed on a scheduled domestic flight in Faridpur Division, East Pakistan after the main gearbox failed, killing 23 of the 24 passengers and crew on board.
- On 10 December 1966, a Pakistan International Airlines Sikorsky S-61 helicopter registration AP-AOA crashed on a scheduled domestic flight in Dhaka, East Pakistan.
- On 22 May 1968, Los Angeles Airways Flight 841 crashed near Paramount, California, resulting in the loss of 23 lives. The accident aircraft, N303Y, serial number 61060, was a Sikorsky S-61L en route to Los Angeles International Airport from the Disneyland Heliport in Anaheim, California.
- On 14 August 1968, Los Angeles Airways Flight 417 crashed in Compton, California, while en route to the Disneyland Heliport in Anaheim, California from Los Angeles International Airport, resulting in the loss of 21 lives. The accident aircraft, N300Y, serial number 61031, was the prototype of the Sikorsky S-61L.

1970s

- On 25 October 1973, a Greenlandair S-61N, OY-HAI "Akigssek" ("Grouse") crashed about 25 mi (40 km) south of Nuuk, resulting in the loss of 15 lives. It was en route to Paamiut from Nuuk. The same aircraft had an emergency landing on the Kangerlussuaq fjord two years earlier, due to flameout on both engines because of ice in the intake.
- On 10 May 1974 a KLM Helikopters S-61N, registration PH-NZC, crashed en route to an oil rig in the North Sea. None of the six people on board (two crew and four passengers) survived. The probable cause was a failure in one of five rotor blades due to metal fatigue. The resulting imbalance caused the motor mounts to fail and caused a fire. The uncontrollable aircraft landed hard in the water, capsized and sank. Investigation indicated that the metal fatigue crack must have spread rapidly in less than four hours. The rotor blades are pressurized with nitrogen gas at 10 psi (69 kPa) to indicate the onset of a metal fatigue failure, yet no pressure loss was indicated during the preflight inspection. As a result of the accident, it was recommended to shorten inspection intervals. The aircraft was recovered from the North Sea floor. It was sold to Carson Helicopter in the U.S. and re-registered as N87580.
- On 16 May 1977, a New York Airways commercial S-61-L, N619PA, suffered a static rollover onto its starboard side at the heliport on top of the Pan Am Building while boarding passengers. The accident killed four boarding passengers, including filmmaker Michael Findlay, and one woman on the street. Seventeen additional passengers and the three flight crew members were uninjured. The landing gear collapse resulted from metal fatigue in the helicopter's main landing gear shock-absorbing strut assembly, which caused the helicopter to tip over without warning. The accident resulted in the permanent closure of the Pan Am Building heliport. As the heliport was closed, the wreckage was removed by disassembling it and taking the assemblies down to street level using the building's freight elevators. The airframe was taken to Cape Town, South Africa, where it was rebuilt, certified and returned to service for the Ship-Service Role off the shores of the Western Cape by the company "Court Helicopter" which was later amalgamated with CHC.

1980s

- On 16 July 1983, British Airways Helicopters' commercial S-61 G-BEON crashed in the southern Celtic Sea, in the Atlantic Ocean, en route from Penzance to St Mary's, Isles of Scilly, in thick fog. Only 6 of the 26 on board survived. It sparked a review of helicopter safety and was the worst civilian helicopter disaster in the UK until 1986.
- On 20 March 1985, an Okanagan Helicopters S-61N (C-GOKZ) ditched in the Atlantic Ocean off Owls Head, Nova Scotia. The aircraft was en route from the MODU Sedco 709 offshore Nova Scotia to the Halifax International Airport (YHZ) when the main gearbox suffered a total loss of transmission fluid. There were 15 passengers and 2 crew on board. There were no injuries during the ditching; however, several passengers suffered varying degrees of hypothermia. As a result of this incident, improved thermal protection and other advancements in helicopter transportation suits were instituted for offshore workers on Canada's east coast.
- On 13 July 1988, a British International Helicopters S-61N, registration G-BEID, suffered an engine failure and fire and ditched into the North Sea. There were no injuries.

1990s

- On 25 July 1990, a British International Helicopters S-61, registration G-BEWL, from Sumburgh Airport crashed onto the Brent Spar oil storage platform as the pilots attempted to land. The aircraft fell into the North Sea, where 6 of the 13 passengers and crew on board died.

2000s

- On 8 July 2006, a Sociedad de Salvamento y Seguridad Marítima S-61N Mk.II search and rescue helicopter, crashed into the Atlantic Ocean while flying from Tenerife to La Palma. There were no survivors among the six people on board.
- On 5 August 2008, two pilots and seven firefighters assigned to the Iron Complex fire in California's Shasta–Trinity National Forest, were killed when Carson Helicopters' S-61N N612AZ crashed on takeoff. Of the thirteen people reportedly on board, one other pilot and three firefighters survived the crash with serious or critical injuries. The NTSB determined that the probable causes were the following actions by Carson Helicopters: 1) the intentional understatement of the helicopter's empty weight, 2) the alteration of the power available chart to exaggerate lift capability, and 3) the use of unapproved above-minimum specification torque in performance calculations that, collectively, resulted in the pilots’ relying on performance calculations that significantly overestimated load-carrying capacity and without an adequate performance margin for a successful takeoff; and insufficient oversight by the U.S. Forest Service and the Federal Aviation Administration. Contributing factors were the flight crew's failure to address the fact that the helicopter had approached its maximum performance capability on two prior departures from the accident site, as they were accustomed to operating at its performance limit. Contributing to the fatalities were the immediate, intense fire due to a fuel spillage upon impact from the fuel tanks that were not crash-resistant, the separation from the floor of the cabin seats that were not crash-resistant, and the use of an inappropriate release mechanism on the seat restraints.

2020s

- On 22 February 2022, an S-61N being flown by Croman Corporation in support of a training operation, crashed and killed the four occupants, at the Pacific Missile Range Facility on the Hawaiian island of Kauai.

== Specifications (S-61N Mk II) ==
Orthographically projected diagram

Data from International Directiory of Civil Aircraft

General characteristics

- Crew: 2
- Capacity: up to 30 passengers
- Length: 58 ft 11 in (17.96 m)
- Height: 17 ft 6 in (5.33 m)
- Empty weight: 12,336 lb (5,596 kg)
- Gross weight: 16,164 lb (7,332 kg)
- Max takeoff weight: 19,000 lb (8,618 kg)
- Powerplant: 2 × General Electric CT58-140 turboshaft engines, 1,500 shp (1,100 kW) each
- Main rotor diameter: 62 ft (19 m)
- Main rotor area: 3,019 sq ft (280.5 m^{2})
- Blade section: NACA 0012

Performance

- Maximum speed: 144 kn (166 mph, 267 km/h)
- Cruise speed: 120 kn (140 mph, 220 km/h)
- Range: 450 nmi (520 mi, 830 km)
- Service ceiling: 12,500 ft (3,800 m)
- Rate of climb: 1,310–2,220 ft/min (6.7–11.3 m/s)

== See also ==
Related development

- Sikorsky SH-3 Sea King
- Sikorsky S-62
- Sikorsky S-61R
- Sikorsky CH-124 Sea King
- Westland Sea King

Aircraft of comparable role, configuration, and era

- Mil Mi-14
