= Bristow Helicopters fleet =

Bristow Helicopters operate a large fleet of 490 helicopters and fixed-wing aircraft. In 2015 it operated 24 helicopter types, however as a result of their restructure due to previous financial difficulties it now operates approximately six types, a significant reduction. The fleet includes unconsolidated affiliates and joint venture partners.

== Current fleet ==
Bristow current helicopter fleet
| Size | Aircraft | Total | Notes |
|---|---|---|---|
| Small | Bell 407 | | Used to carry 4 to 6 passengers for smaller production facilities, daytime flights and shorter routes. |
| Small | Bell 206b | 1 | Operated purely on/for training of Bristow pilots. |
| Medium | Sikorsky S-76C+/C++ | 44 | |
| Super Medium-lift | AgustaWestland AW189 | 2? | Under contract to the Ministry of Defence (MoD) in the Falkland Islands in SAR role since the acquisition of British International Helicopters in 2022. |
| Large | Sikorsky S-92 | 19 | Six of which are based at Scatsta in the Shetland Islands. Also operated from Bristow Gulf of Mexico, Norway, Nigeria and Brazil. Newest to Aberdeen, the 200th S92 off the production line, G-GALC, registered with respect to the Royal Baby - George Alexander Louis Cambridge. With its acquisition of British International Helicopters, two Sikorsky S-92 helicopters are also operated in the Falkland Islands on contract to the MoD. |
| Large | Mil Mi-8 | 8 | |
| Large | Eurocopter EC225 Super Puma Mk II+ | 12 | Used in North Sea operations supporting the oil & gas industry, Bristow in Australia also operate 7. |
| | Total | 84 + unknown number of Bell 407 aircraft | |

=== Training ===
Training helicopters are used for initial pilot training, typically carrying up to 4 passengers and crew. Many of Bristow's aircraft are part of a technologically advanced fleet from an avionics perspective. This has allowed pilots from the academy to transition more smoothly into various roles including aerial tours, utility, and various other operations. While the majority of Bristow's training helicopters are operated by Bristow Academy in Titusville, Florida, a small number of aircraft operate out of a secondary training base located in New Iberia, Florida.

Training helicopters
| Aircraft | Total | Notes |
|---|---|---|
| Schweizer 300 CB/Cbi | 32 | |
| Robinson R22 | 9 | |
| Robinson R44 | 6 | |
| Bell 206 | 11 | |
| Total | Approx. 58 | |

== Fixed-wing aircraft ==
Bristow's Fixed Wing Service provides a range of fixed-wing transportation services for crew transport to helicopter bases around the world. Bristow operates jet and turbo prop aircraft to meet the needs of the global oil and gas industry. For subsidiary Eastern Airways fixed wing jet and turboprop aircraft, see Eastern Airways.

Fixed-wing aircraft
| Aircraft | Total | Notes |
|---|---|---|
| Embraer ERJ 135ER | 2 | Bristow Helicopters Nigeria |
| Embraer ERJ 145LU | 1 | Bristow Helicopters Nigeria |
| British Aerospace BAe-125-700B, -800 and 1000B | ? | |
| Beech 200 Super King Air | ? | |
| Piper PA-34-220T Seneca III | ? | |
| Total number of aircraft | 15 | |

== Former fleet ==
- Westland Widgeon - Offshore support operations initially the Persian Gulf and then in Nigeria. Three abandoned in Nigeria as a result of the Nigeria-Biafra Conflict. Five operated from 1957 to 1968.
- Westland Wessex - 15 Wessex Mk.60s built at Yeovil, based on the RAF HC.2 but with improved avionics and seating for 10, and one conversion from an ex-Ghana Air Force Wessex Mk.53 by Bristow at Redhill. 16 operated from 1965 to 1981.
- Westland Whirlwind
- Westland AB-47G-4A
- Aerospatiale SA-330J Puma
- AS332L Super Puma - Branded by Bristow as "Tiger", were used for North West Shelf hydrocarbon personnel transfer operations & North Sea Oil and Gas. No longer operated.
- Eurocopter AS350
- Eurocopter EC 135
- Eurocopter EC 155 - Six were in service for Shell Nigeria, aircraft also have external life rafts and are equipped for SAR duties.
- Sikorsky S-61 - Were used for SAR out of Den Helder. No longer operated.
- Sikorsky S-76A
- Bell 206L
- Bell 212
- Bell 214ST
- Bell 412
- BO-105
- BK-117
- Britten-Norman BN-2A-20 Islander
- Twin Otter
- Hiller UH-12C - Purchased in 1964 and operated at their Redhill and Middle Wallop flying schools.
- Scottish Aviation Twin Pioneer Srs1 - Crashed on 4 April 1967 in Nigeria after stalling and during a single engine approach.
