= 1988 British International Helicopters Sikorsky S-61N crash =

Helicopter crash with no fatalities

Coordinates: 60°17′N 0°44′W

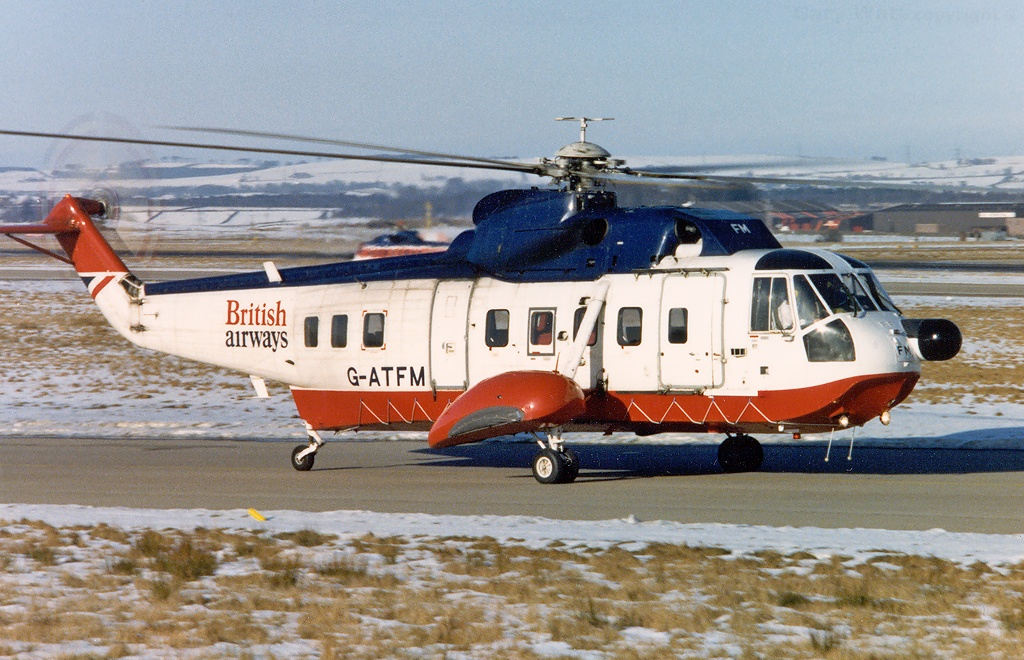
- A British Airways Helicopters Sikorsky S-61N similar to the aircraft involved

Accident
- Date: 13 July 1988
- Summary: Forced water landing due to uncontrolled engine fire
- Site: 29 nmi (54 km; 33 mi) northeast of Sumburgh, Scotland

Aircraft
- Aircraft type: Sikorsky S-61N
- Operator: British International Helicopters
- Registration: G-BEID
- Flight origin: Safe Felicia accommodation vessel
- Destination: Sumburgh Airport, Shetland Islands
- Passengers: 19
- Crew: 2
- Fatalities: 0
- Injuries: 0
- Survivors: 21

G-BEID was a Sikorsky S-61N helicopter of British International Helicopters which made a controlled ditching in the sea 29 nmi (54 km; 33 mi) northeast of Sumburgh on 13 July 1988 following an engine fire. There were no fatalities.

== Accident ==
The helicopter left the Safe Felicia semi-submersible oil platform in the Forties oilfield at 13:45 with 2 pilots and a full load of 19 passengers for the one hour flight to Sumburgh Airport on the Mainland of Shetland.

At 14:28 the co-pilot (who was flying) reported hearing a muffled bang which was also heard by some of the passengers, from the area of the No. 2 engine transmission. Shortly after, the No. 2 engine's fire warning lights came on. The pilot immediately began a descent and transmitted a distress call.

About 48 seconds after the noise, the No. 2 engine was shut down and the fire extinguisher triggered. The No. 1 engine fire warning then also illuminated, while passengers saw oil leaking from the cabin ceiling.

The pilot advised the passengers to prepare for an emergency ditching and took control of the aircraft. The floats were deployed and a gentle ditching was made about 3 minutes after the initial noise had been heard, by which time the helicopter's cabin had filled with smoke. All 21 occupants evacuated on to liferafts and were then winched up into a Search and Rescue helicopter. After a strong fire consumed most of the floating helicopter, the remains broke up and sank.

== Investigation ==
A recovery operation was mounted using the DSV (diving support vessel) Stena Marianos which arrived on site on 16 July 1988. The aft fuselage section was raised the following day and the forward section shortly after. The recovery operation had to be ended on 19 July before finding the engines or transmission components due to the Stena Marianos having other commitments.

The recovery continued on 2 August using the DSV Norskald, and the engines, main rotor, and transmission were located and raised on 5 August.

=== Cause ===
It was concluded that the fire had occurred in the helicopter's main gearbox, probably resulting from the effects of a bearing failure in the No. 2 engine. A further factor was the lack of fire detection or suppression capability within the gearbox bay. The cause of the bearing failure could not be definitely established.

=== Safety recommendations ===
The AAIB made a list of 27 safety recommendations to the CAA. These addressed improvements in maintenance, early detection of problems, emergency escape equipment, documentation and training provisions, and firewall integrity. Most of these were accepted by the CAA.
