= Chinook helicopter crash =

Chinook helicopter crash may refer to:

- the 1986 British International Helicopters Chinook crash in Shetland, killing oil workers
- the 1994 Scotland RAF Chinook crash, killing British intelligence officers
- the 2011 Chinook shootdown in Afghanistan, killing American special forces
