= British International Helicopters =

British helicopter operator

IATA	ICAO	Call sign
BS	BIH	BRINTEL
- Founded: 2000
- Hubs: Coventry Airport, Newquay Airport, RAF Mount Pleasant
- Subsidiaries: BIH (Onshore); British International Helicopter Services; Patriot Aviation
- Fleet size: 10
- Parent company: Bristow Group
- Headquarters: Coventry Airport, Warwickshire, United Kingdom
- Website: britishinternationalhelicopters.com

British International Helicopter Services (BIH), owned by Bristow Group, is a British-owned helicopter operator. It operates a fleet of ten helicopters covering search and rescue, offshore, defence, charter and flying training activities from its bases at Newquay Airport, Coventry Airport and RAF Mount Pleasant in the Falkland Islands.

It operates from Newquay using two Eurocopter AS 365N2 Dauphin helicopters on behalf of the Royal Navy Flag Officer Sea Training (FOST) based at HMS Drake in HMNB Devonport. A Sikorsky S-61 helicopter is also used on occasions for FOST duties.

In 2015, BIH as part of a wider group won a £180 million ten-year contract to operate from RAF Mount Pleasant with the contract commencing in 2016. Two Sikorsky S-61 helicopters were used for everyday military transport and land logistic support around the islands (until replaced by the Sikorsky S-92 in 2023), where there are few roads and a 12-mile (19 km) strip of sea separates the two main islands. Search and rescue is conducted using two AW189 helicopters.

Coventry Airport operator BIH (Onshore) functions as BIH's utilities division, servicing an operational workload that includes police and air ambulance capability, commercial helicopter support including surveying, pipeline patrols, TV mast calibration, load lifting, forestry and national park services and film work. BIH (Onshore) also maintains BIH's VIP and commercial charter business, flight training for both commercial and private pilots and helicopter engineering across a wide range of helicopter and aeroplane types.

== History ==
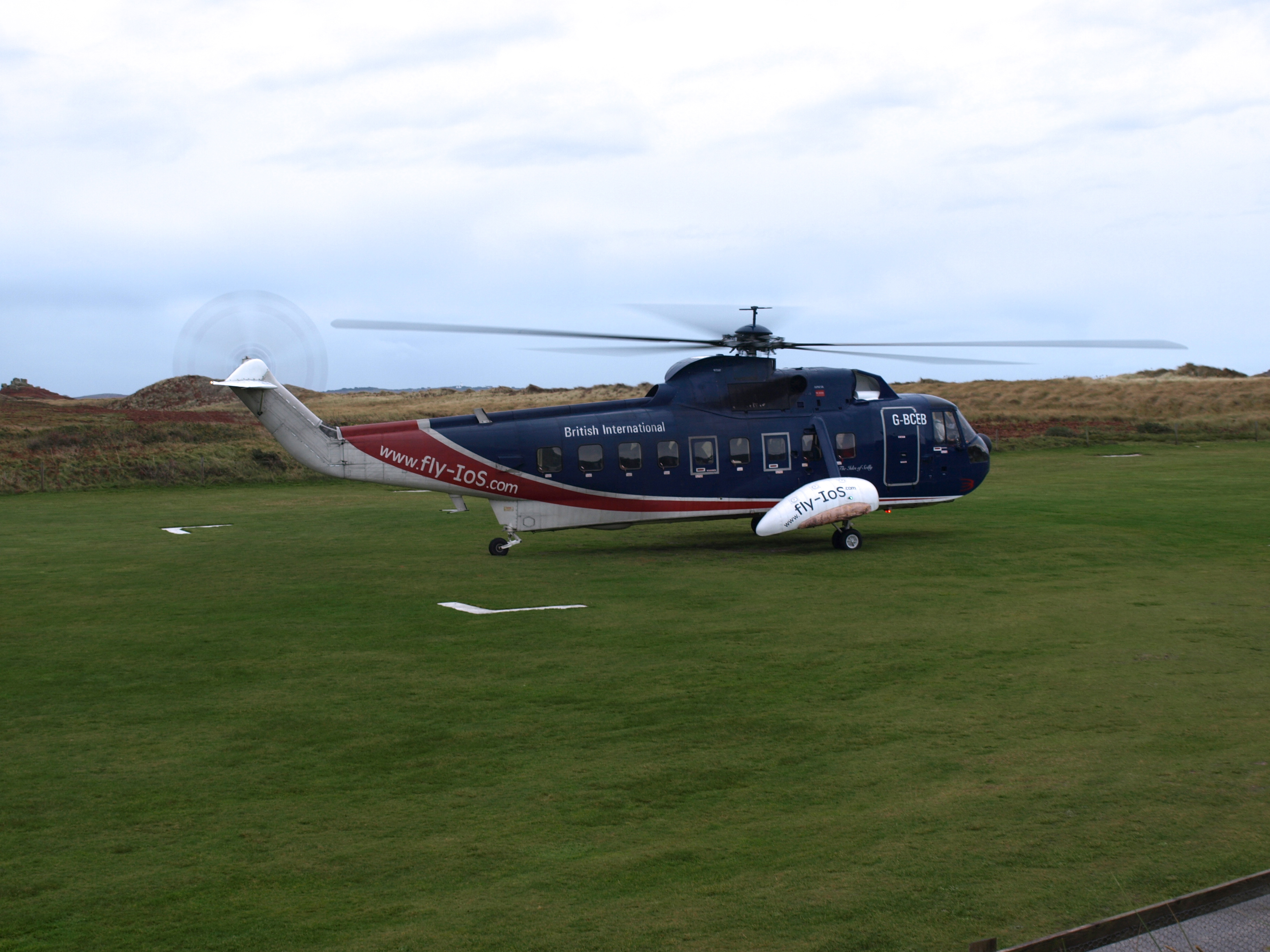
BIH Sikorsky S-61N at Tresco Heliport, 2008

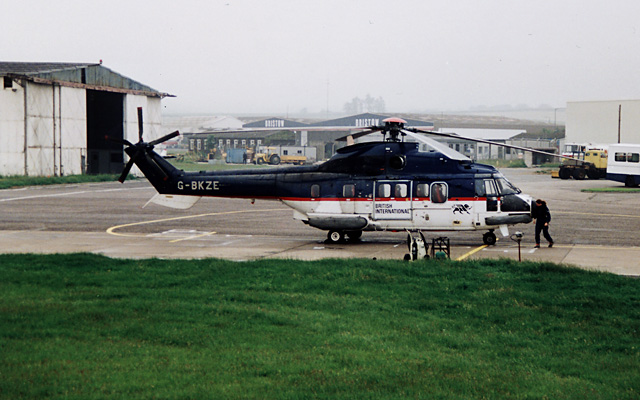
BIH AS332L Super Puma at Aberdeen Airport, 1991

The company was originally British Airways Helicopters until its privatisation in September 1986, when it was sold to publisher Robert Maxwell and subsequently renamed British International Helicopters.

In 1993, CHC Helicopter acquired 40% of BIH's voting shares, and raised their shareholding to 90% within a year. BIH became the UK subsidiary of CHC, as Brintel Helicopters. In October 1996, Brintel acquired the Cardiff-based Veritair.

The current incarnation of the company was formed in 2000, with the backing of 3i Group and the Bank of Scotland, through a management buy in of the non-oil related operations of Scotia Helicopters and CHC Helicopter, with the Bank of Scotland providing funding of £22 million.

In 2006, BIH finalised a secondary management buy-out financed by a syndicate of investors led by Matrix Private Equity Partners, with the backing of Finance Cornwall and Chrysalis Venture Capital Trust.

As a result of the loss of a South Wales Police helicopter air support contract, the business of British International at Cardiff was sold in May 2008 to the management team led by Captain Julian Verity. The new company Heli Charter Wales is trading as Veritair Aviation.

Veritair changed its name to British International Helicopter Services in October 2008.

In June 2013, the company was acquired by The Rigby Group subsidiary Patriot Aerospace to supplement its existing aviation activities.

It was announced in April 2022 that Bristow Group was to acquire BIH in an all cash transaction. The sale was completed on 2 August 2022. The purchase included all of BIH's aircraft, employees and existing contracts. The BIH name and branding will be phased out and replaced by that of the wider Bristow Group.

=== Cessation of passenger flights ===
On 1 August 2012, it was announced that the service between Cornwall and the Isles of Scilly would be withdrawn from November. A Judicial Review triggered by the Tesco supermarket group over the sale of Penzance Heliport to Sainsburys created a period of delay which affected the finance to replace the fleet of helicopters.

BIH flew seasonal and year-round domestic scheduled services from its main base at Penzance Heliport (EGHK/PZE), with services to St. Mary's Airport (EGHE/ISC), and Tresco Heliport (EGHT/TSO), Isles of Scilly. It used two Sikorsky S-61 helicopters from a pool of nine of the type that it owned. The flights ceased on 31 October 2012.

== Fleet ==
- British International Helicopter Services:
  - G-ATBJ Sikorsky S-61N 1965
  - G-ATFM Sikorsky S-61N 1965
  - G-BCEB Sikorsky S-61N 1965
  - G-BFRI Sikorsky S-61N 1978
  - G-FSAR Agusta AW189 2015
  - G-SAAR Agusta AW189 2015
  - ZJ164 Airbus Helicopters AS365N2 1991
  - ZJ165 Airbus Helicopters AS365N2 1990
- BIH (Onshore):
  - G-CHKW - Robinson R44 (Raven)
  - G-NWPS – Eurocopter EC135 T.1 1998
  - G-SCHZ – Eurocopter AS355 Ecureuil 2 1999

== Accidents and incidents ==
Although British International Helicopter Services (including its time under the Veritair banner) has suffered no accidents since its inception in May 2000, the following events were experienced by its predecessors:

- 16 July 1983 – A British Airways Helicopters Sikorsky S-61N G-BEON crashed into the southern Celtic Sea en route from Penzance to St. Mary's Airport in low visibility. The crash killed 20 of the 26 passengers and crew (see 1983 British Airways Sikorsky S-61 crash), making it the worst UK Helicopter accident until the 1986 British International Helicopters Chinook crash.
- 6 November 1986 – A British International Helicopters Boeing 234LR Chinook crashed on approach to Sumburgh Airport, Shetland Islands, killing 45 (see 1986 British International Helicopters Chinook crash).
- 13 July 1988 – A Sikorsky S-61N ditched into the North Sea, no injuries (see 1988 British International Helicopters Sikorsky S-61N crash).
- 1 February 2018 A Sikorsky S61N G-ATBJ Struck the Ground at Marchwood sea port after being ship transferred from the Falkland Islands. After a hover check the Aircraft pitched forward and struck the ground nose first. (See AAIB investigation to Sikorsky S-61N Sea King, G-ATBJ - GOV.UK
- 21 April 2000 – A Veritair Eurocopter AS355 operating for South Wales Police crashed into a house in Cardiff when the tail rotor drive failed.
