= British Airways Helicopters =

Helicopter airline in Britain

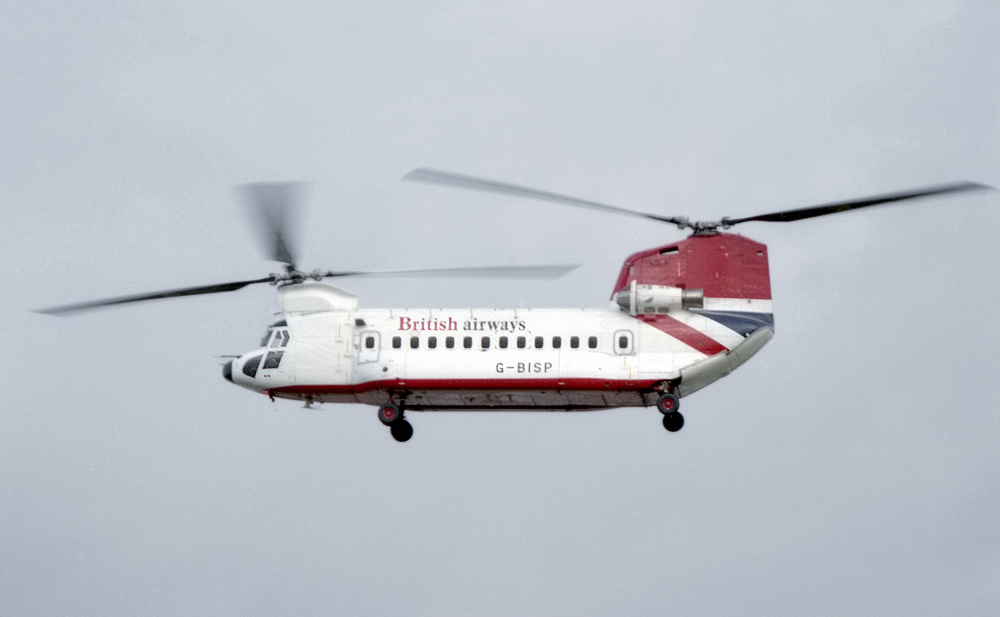
- Boeing-Vertol 234
IATA	ICAO	Call sign
BA	BAB	—
- Founded: 1964 (as BEAH)
- Commenced operations: 1964
- Ceased operations: September 1986 (changed name to British International Helicopters)
- Headquarters: Aberdeen Airport

British Airways Helicopters, previously operating as British European Airways Helicopters Ltd, was an airline operating helicopters in the United Kingdom from 1964 to 1986. It was mainly known for providing a passenger service connecting Penzance to the Isles of Scilly, and for flights servicing North Sea oil and gas platforms.

In 1986, British Airways sold this helicopter division to Robert Maxwell, and it was renamed British International Helicopters.

== History ==
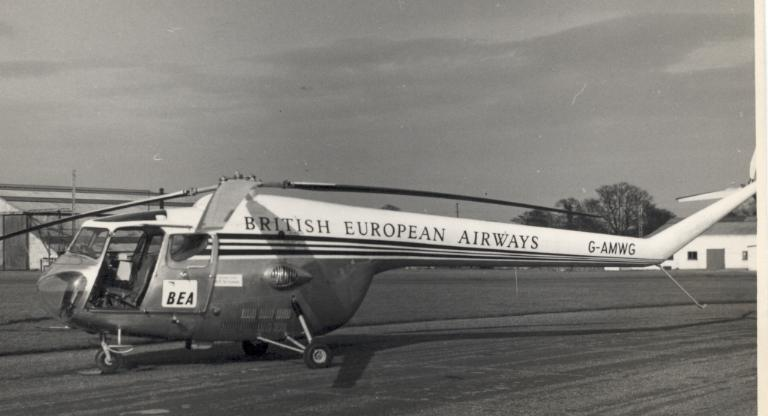
Bristol 171 Sycamore G-AMWG "Sir Gawain" at Gatwick Airport in April 1955 operating the passenger service from Birmingham

Helicopter Experimental Unit

Established in July 1947 and starting in early 1948, British European Airways (BEA) had operated a Helicopter Experimental Unit. It initially operated a fleet of five helicopters sourced from the United States - three Sikorsky S-51s and two Bell 47s.

The unit operated timetabled mail services in East Anglia during 1948 using their Westland-Sikorsky S51s. A scheduled passenger service was operated during 1950 between Cardiff (Pengam Moors), Wrexham and Liverpool (Speke), also utilising the S-51s. In June 1951, BEA introduced helicopter services between Northolt Aerodrome, Hay Mills Rotor Station in Birmingham and London Heathrow, operated by a pair of S-51s. These services were followed in June 1954 by a passenger service between Southampton Eastleigh Airport, Heathrow and Northolt, operated by Westland Whirlwind helicopters. The 1955 passenger service was flown between Birmingham, Heathrow and Gatwick Airport, with leased Bristol 171s.

British European Airways Helicopters Ltd. and British Airways Helicopters Ltd.

A separate company was formed in early 1964 and operated the first service between Penzance and the Scilly Islands on 1 May 1964 with a Sikorsky S-61. The airline expanded into offshore oil & gas support flights from July 1965, from an operating base at Beccles Airfield, in Suffolk. Operations from Aberdeen Airport started in July 1967 and in 1971 from Sumburgh Airport.

The company was involved in setting up the Airlink high-frequency helicopter shuttle service between Gatwick and Heathrow airports in 1978. It was responsible for engineering and maintenance of the BAA-owned helicopter and for providing the flight crew. Cabin crew were from British Caledonian as was passenger handling at Gatwick. Heathrow handling was by British Airways.

With the change of name of the parent on 31 March 1974 the airline was renamed British Airways Helicopters Ltd. In 1981, the airline bought six Boeing Vertol BV-234 Chinooks for use on the offshore oil support flights.

In 1986, the airline was sold by British Airways to Robert Maxwell's Maxwell Aviation and renamed British International Helicopters on September, 23. The successor company still operated the Penzance-Isles of Scilly route forty years after it was first scheduled, until it was cancelled on October 31, 2012.

== Fleet ==
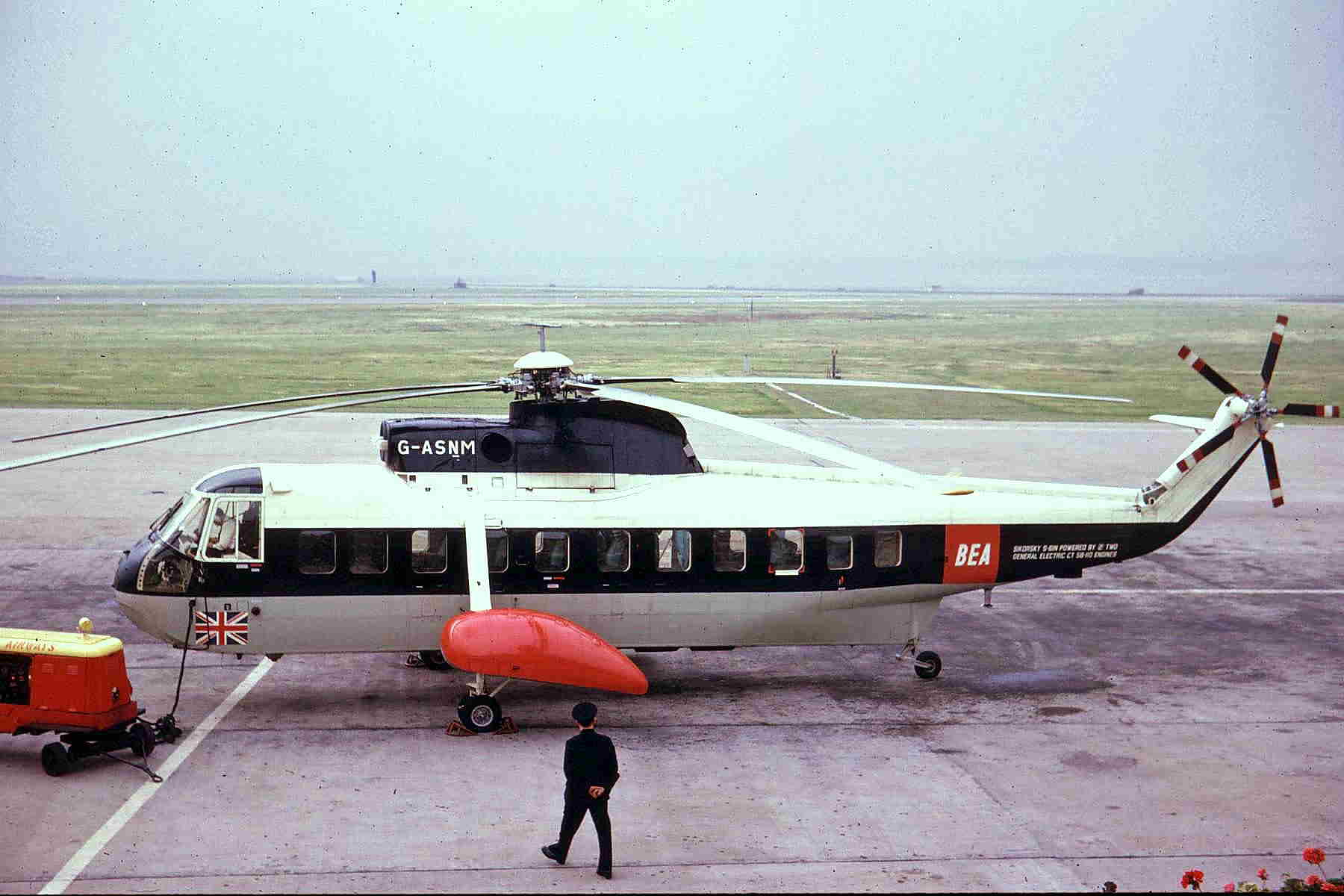
Sikorsky S-61

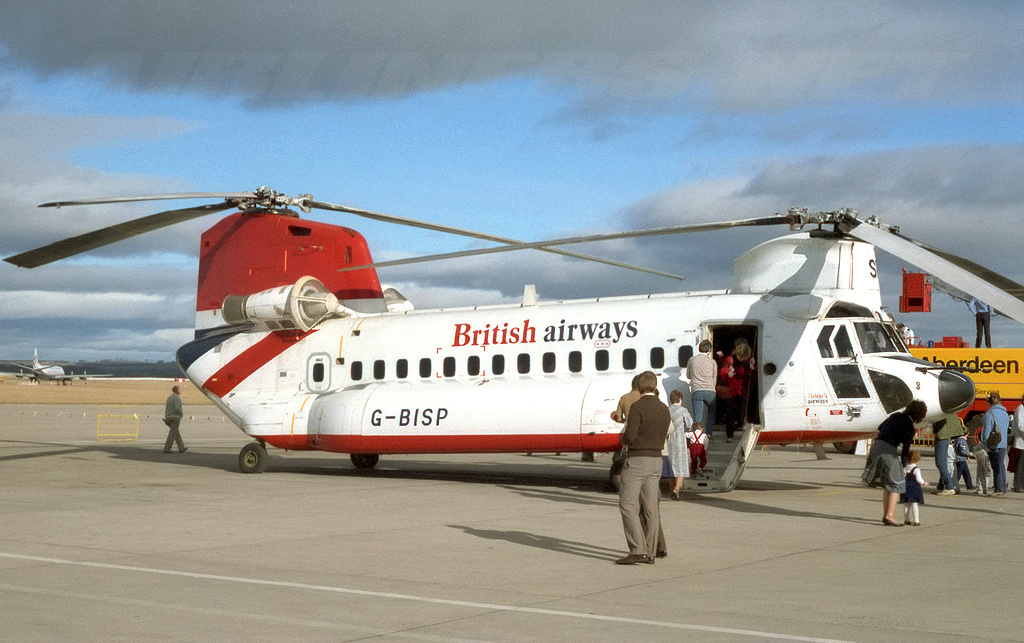
Boeing Vertol BV-234

- 1964–86 Sikorsky S-61
- 1968–84 Agusta-Bell 206 JetRanger
- 1974–81 Sikorsky S-58T
- 1978–83 Bell 212
- 1980–86 Boeing Vertol BV-234
- 1979–86 Sikorsky S-76
- 1982–86 Westland 30
- 1983–86 Aerospatiale AS.332L Super Puma

=== Helicopter Experimental Unit fleet ===
- Bell 47
- Bristol 171
- Sikorsky S-51
- Sikorsky S-61
- Westland Sikorsky WS-55

== Accidents and incidents ==
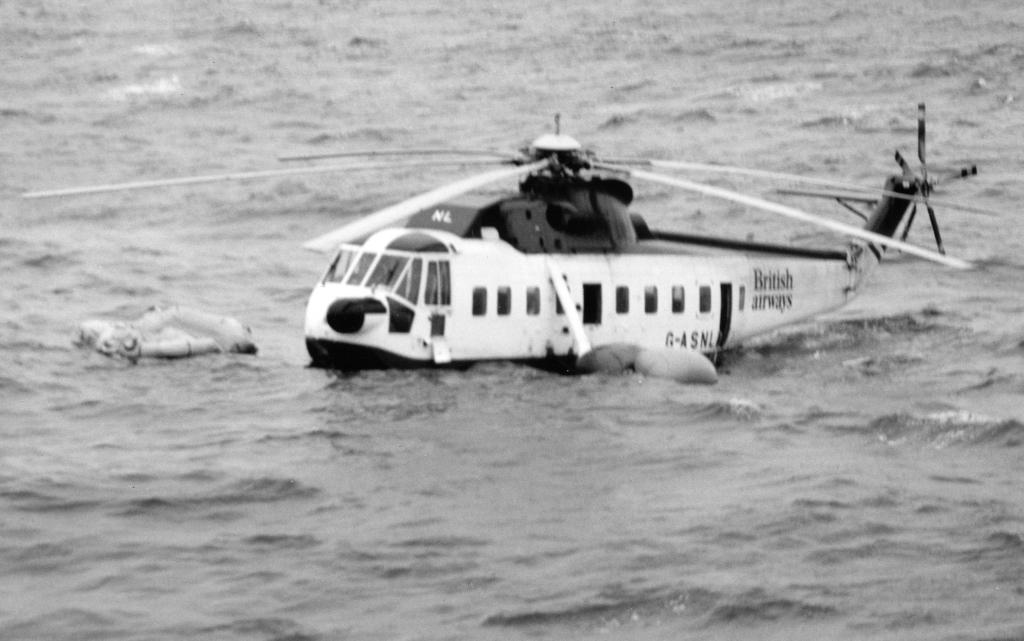
Sikorsky S-61N (G-ASNL) crashed in the North Sea 1983

1. On 11 March 1983 a Sikorsky S-61N (registration G-ASNL) crashed in the North Sea, 75 nautical miles (139 km) north east of Aberdeen. All crew and passengers were rescued but the helicopter sank and had to be recovered from the sea bed.
2. On 16 July 1983 a Sikorsky S-61N (registered G-BEON) crashed on approach to St Mary's Airport, Isles of Scilly with the loss of 19 passengers and one crew member.
3. On 2 May 1984 a Boeing 234 (registered G-BISO) crashed in the East Shetland Basin of the North Sea, 8 miles (13 km) north west of the Cormorant Alpha platform. Crew and all passengers were rescued by other helicopters and boats. Although not damaged in the accident the helicopter sank after 85 minutes. The aircraft was recovered for post accident investigation and later refurbished to fly again.

== In popular culture ==
In the Beatles first film, A Hard Day's Night, the group is seen flying away from the concert venue at the end of the film in the BEA Westland Whirlwind, G-ANFH. The same aircraft appeared in the 1960 film, The Murderers and the 1963 Oliver Reed film, The Damned.

== See also ==
- List of defunct airlines of the United Kingdom
- Lo Bao, P. (1985). A history of British Airways Helicopters and its predecessors since 1947. Air-Britain Historians Ltd.
