= Penzance Heliport =

Heliport in Cornwall, England

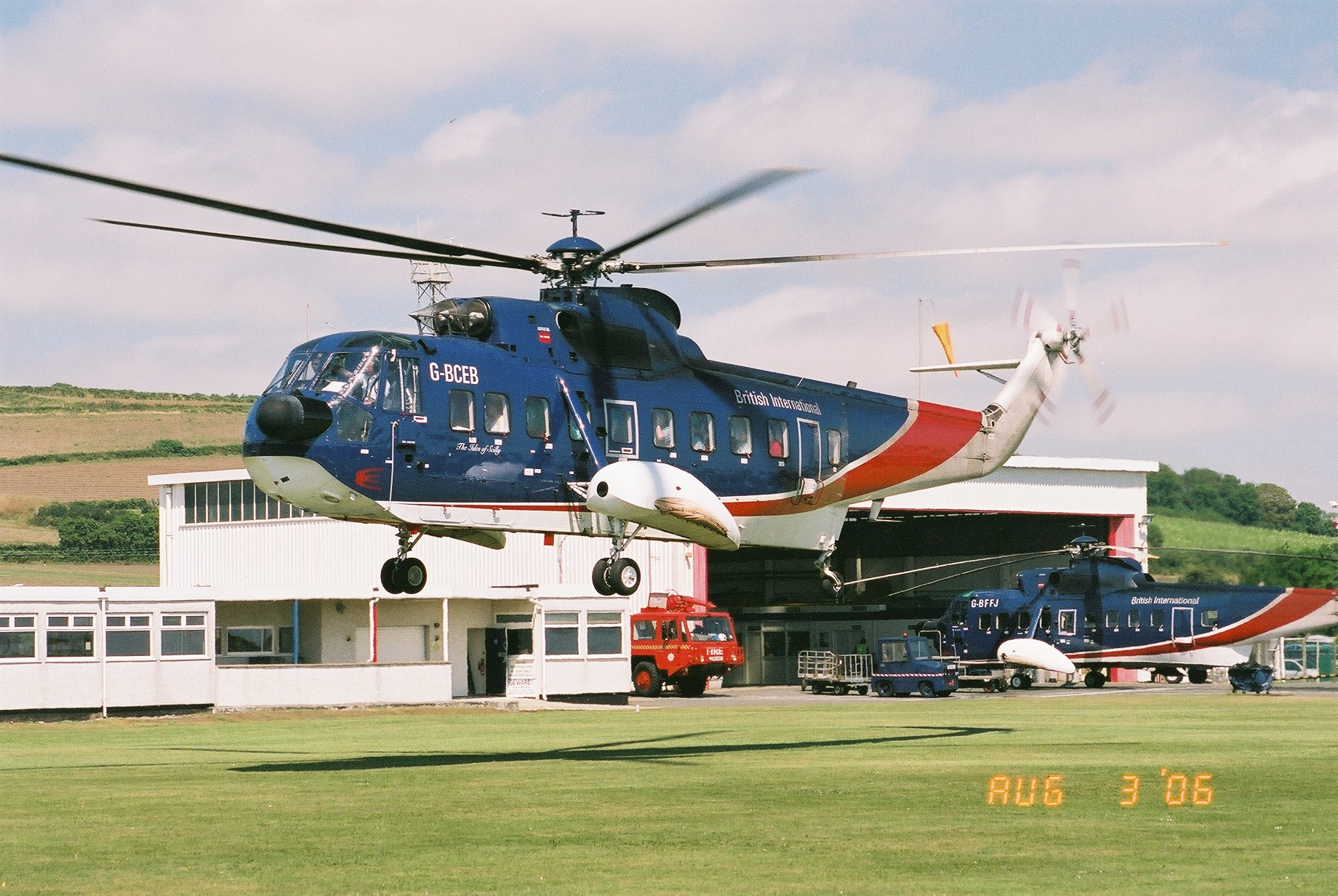
- IATA: PZE; ICAO: EGHK

Summary
- Airport type: Private
- Owner: Penzance Heliport Ltd
- Operator: Penzance Helicopters
- Location: Penzance, Cornwall, England
- Elevation AMSL: 21 ft (6.4 m)
- Coordinates: 50.1304°N 5.5139°W
- Website: penzanceheliport.co.uk

Map
- Location in Cornwall

Runways
Direction	Length		Surface
Direction	ft	m	Surface
08/26		385	Grass
			Concrete pad
- Sources: UK AIP at NATS; Penzance Heliport- Visiting Pilots Information

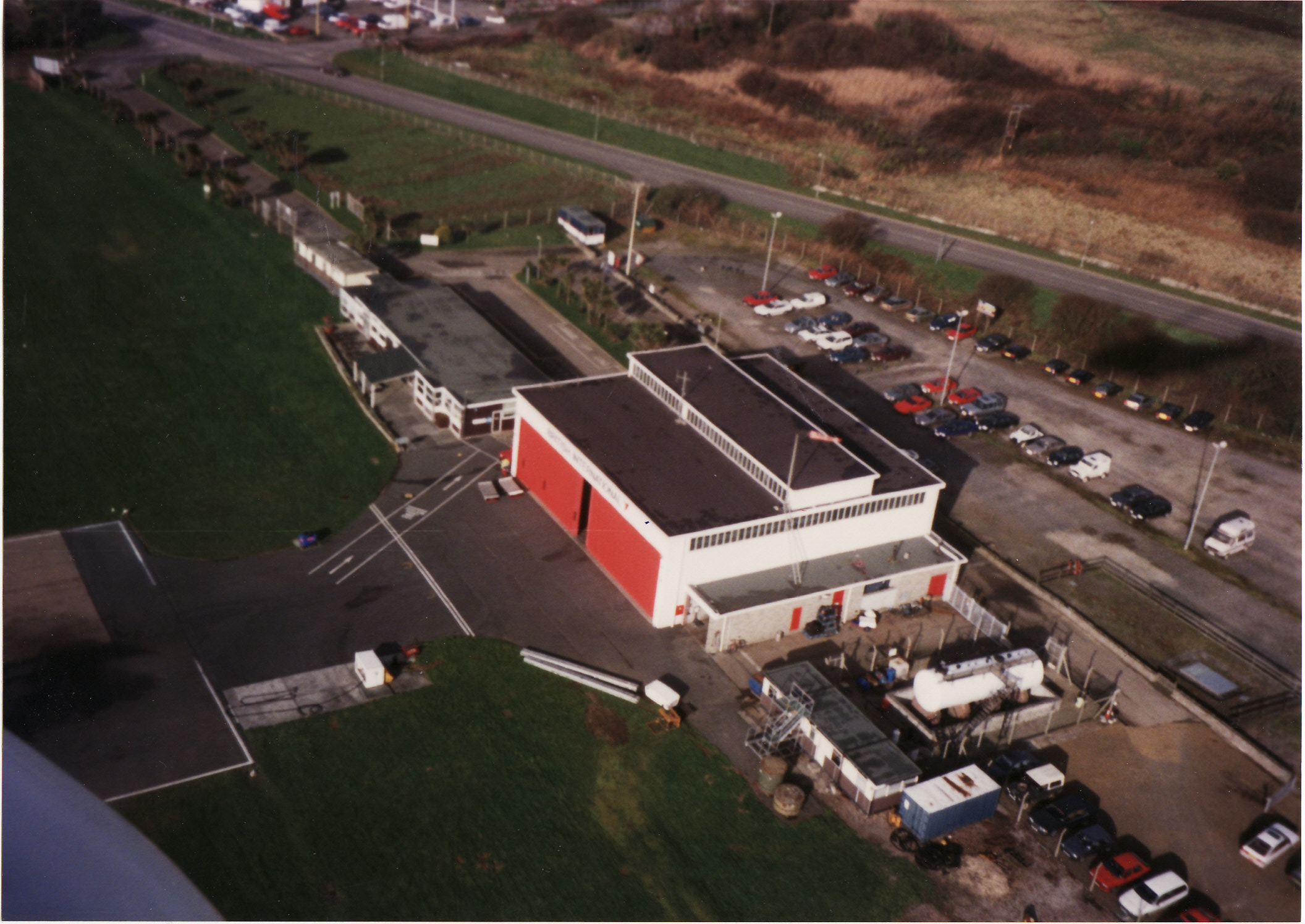
Penzance Heliport from the air, 2015

Penzance Heliport (IATA: PZE, ICAO: EGHK) is located 1 mile (1.6 km) northeast of Penzance, Cornwall, England. The heliport hosts scheduled flights to the Isles of Scilly, with a connection to the railway network at Penzance railway station by a special bus service.

Penzance Heliport has existed at two separate locations at different times. The newer heliport was built during 2018 and 2019 on the north side of Jelbert Way and the A30 and is the base for a helicopter service to the islands of Tresco and St Mary's.

The original heliport, on the south side of Jelbert Way and a few hundred metres closer to Penzance, was opened in 1964, and operated for 48 years before closing in 2012.

== Original heliport (1964–2012) ==
Services started on 1 May 1964 when British European Airways (BEA) Helicopters operated the first service between Penzance and the Isles of Scilly with a Sikorsky S-61.

The original heliport was formally opened five months later on 1 September 1964 by Councillor Alfred Beckerleg, the Mayor of Penzance with the Lady Mayoress, and cost £88,000 (equivalent to £1,600,000 in 2025). This heliport had a single concrete landing pad, which was 30 m × 30 m (98 ft × 98 ft), adjacent to a 373 m × 45 m (1,224 ft × 148 ft) grass strip, aligned 08/26.

With the merger of BEA and BOAC to form British Airways in 1974 the helicopter division was renamed British Airways Helicopters. In 1986, the helicopter division was sold to Robert Maxwell's Maxwell Aviation and renamed British International Helicopters, who continued to operate the Penzance to Isles of Scilly route until it was withdrawn in 2012, forty-eight years after it was first scheduled.

In early April 2013, demolition work on the main terminal buildings began, and by September 2013, nothing remained of the former heliport (at 50.1280°N 5.5183°W), with a supermarket chain now dominating the site.

== New heliport (2020–present) ==
In 2016 plans were announced for a new helicopter service between Penzance and the Isles of Scilly, serving both St Mary's and Tresco. The proposals include building a new heliport on Jelbert Way, Penzance, near to the location of the old one. The planning application received the highest level of support Cornwall Council had ever received for a planning application.

Planning consent for the new heliport was first granted in a unanimous decision by Cornwall Council's Strategic Planning Committee in February 2017. The decision was later challenged by the Isles of Scilly Steamship Company in a judicial review. A petition against the Judicial Review gained more than 11,000 signatures and an amended planning application was submitted.

The amended application was granted planning consent in a second unanimous decision by Cornwall Council in August 2018.

The new heliport was built during 2018 and 2019, with services commencing in March 2020, flying to the islands of St Mary's and Tresco.

== Airlines and destinations ==
Airlines	Destinations
Starspeed	Tresco, St Mary’s
