= KLM Helikopters =

Netherlands helicopter airline

| IATA | ICAO | Call sign |
|---|---|---|
| KL | AMS | KLM HELI |
- Founded: October 1965
- Ceased operations: 1998
- Hubs: Amsterdam Airport Schiphol
- Secondary hubs: Den Helder Airport
- Fleet size: 11
- Destinations: North Sea oil rigs
- Parent company: KLM
- Headquarters: Amsterdam, Netherlands
- Key people: M. S. Kamminga (manager); H. Zeedijk (chief pilot)

KLM Helikopters N.V. was a Dutch civil helicopter operator founded in 1965, and was wholly owned subsidiary of KLM.

== History ==
Also known as KLM Noordzee Helikopters the company provided offshore support flights, charters, and search and rescue. Their fleet consisted of seven Sikorsky S-61N's, four Sikorsky S-76B's, two Sikorsky S-58T's and two MBB Bo 105's. In 1991 the company expanded when Era Helicopters a division of Era Aviation acquire a 49% of KLM, and provided them with growth in Alaska region. until the company was sold to Schreiner Airways in 1998.

== Fleet ==
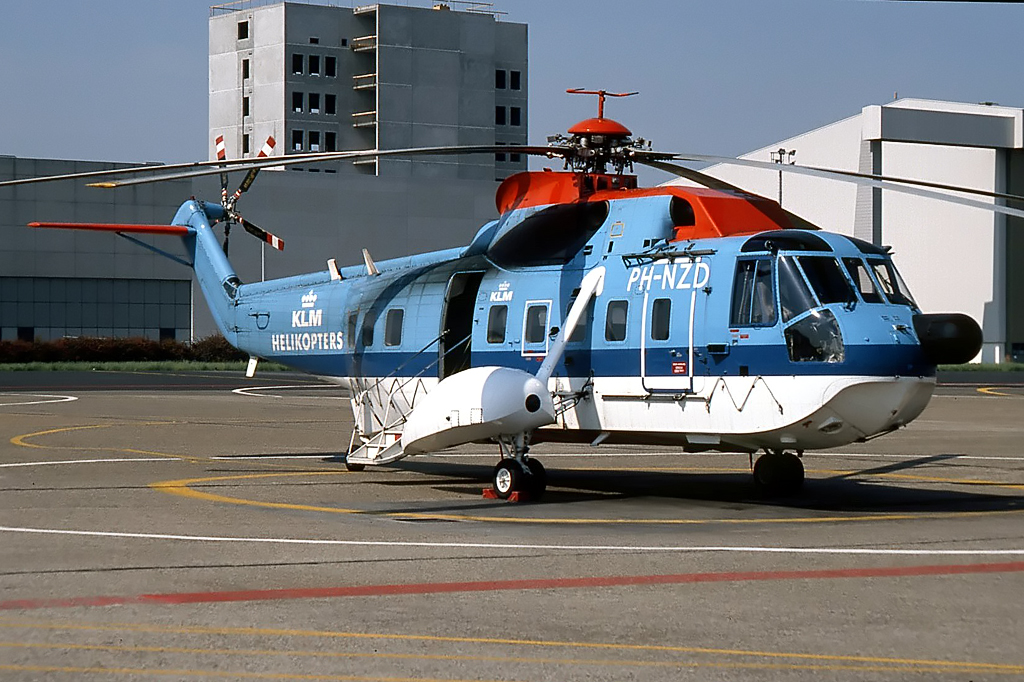
KLM Helikopters Sikorsky S-61N

KLM Helikopters operated the following helicopter types:

KLM Helikopters fleet
| Aircraft | Total | Introduced | Retired | Notes |
|---|---|---|---|---|
| MBB Bo 105C | 1 | 1976 | 1982 | |
| MBB Bo 105Cbs-4 | 2 | 1993 | 1994 | |
| Sikorsky S-58 | 2 | 1975 | 1980 | |
| Sikorsky S-61N | 9 | 1969 | 1998 | |
| Sikorsky S-62 | 1 | 1967 | 1972 | |
| Sikorsky S-76B | 8 | 1986 | 1998 | |

== Accidents ==
- On May 10, 1974 KLM Noordzee Helikopters Sikorsky S-61N PH-NZC crashed en route to an oil rig in the North Sea. None of the two crew and four passengers survived. The probable cause was a failure in one of five rotor blades due to metal fatigue.
- On December 29, 1990, a Sikorsky S-61N was in a hover when serious vibrations were experienced. After touchdown one of the main rotor blades struck the fuselage and detached before the engines were shut down, no injuries were reported.

== See also ==
- List of defunct airlines of the Netherlands
