= Croman Corporation =

- Type: Private
- Industry: Aviation
- Founded: 1976
- Headquarters: White City, Oregon, U.S.
- Website: Croman.net

Croman Corporation is a helicopter operating company based in White City, Oregon, United States. The company provides aviation services including heli-logging, aerial fire suppression, helicopter flight support, heavy-lift construction, external cargo delivery and charter operations. In addition the company operates an FAA-approved 14 CFR Part 145 Repair Station.

== Heliport ==
Croman Heliport (FAA LID: 39OR) is a private heliport located 1 mile east of White City in Jackson County, Oregon, USA.

== Fleet ==
Croman operates a fleet of Sikorsky S-61 and SH-3 helicopters. The company has also operated Bell 206BIII Jet Ranger, Lama 315B, and Hiller 12E Soloy helicopters.

== See also ==
- List of companies based in Oregon
