= Tresco Heliport =

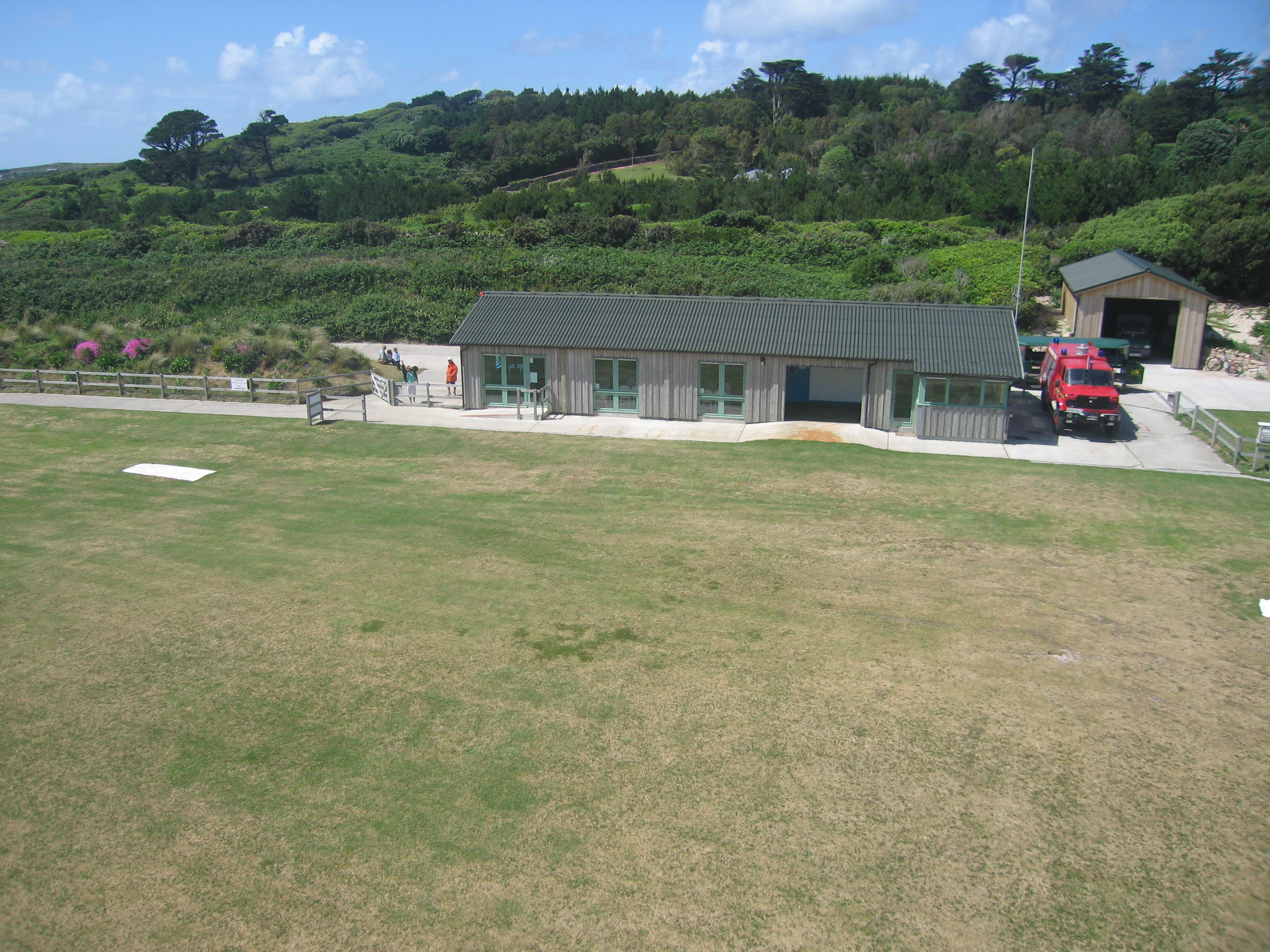
- IATA: TSO; ICAO: EGHT

Summary
- Airport type: Public
- Operator: Tresco Estates
- Location: Tresco, Isles of Scilly
- Elevation AMSL: 20 ft (6.1 m)
- Coordinates: 49°56′44″N 006°19′53″W

Map
- Location on Isles of Scilly

Helipads
Number	Length		Surface
Number	m	ft	Surface
07/25	30 × 30	98 × 98	Grass
- Sources: UK AIP at NATS

Tresco Heliport (ICAO: EGHT) is a heliport located on the island of Tresco, in the Isles of Scilly off the southwest coast of the United Kingdom. The heliport was served by a scheduled helicopter service from 1983 to 2012, and since 2020 a new scheduled service now operates from the new Penzance Heliport. Currently, Tresco Heliport offers a landing site for private and charter helicopters by private arrangement.

== History ==
Tresco Heliport had a CAA Ordinary Licence (Number P677) that allowed flights for the public transport of passengers for flying instruction as authorised by the licensee. The aerodrome was not licensed for night use.

The heliport was owned and operated by Tresco Estate, who lease the island from the Duchy of Cornwall. Tresco Heliport was opened by John King, Baron King of Wartnaby, Chairman of British Airways, on 26 April 1983.

Tresco's principal industry is tourism, and the heliport supported this by enabling a scheduled helicopter service to and from the mainland. This scheduled service came to an end in 2012.

On summer weekdays the heliport received up to six flights a day from Penzance Heliport on the mainland, with two services a day in winter. Passengers were conveyed from the heliport to their resort or destination on a passenger carrying trailer drawn by a farm tractor. A footpath from one of the main landing beaches, at Carn Near, to the Abbey Gardens crosses the heliport landing field; it was closed by warning lights and bells a few minutes before a helicopter was due to land at the heliport, and opened again after the helicopter had taken off.

The heliport was officially closed on 31 October 2012 and all commercial flights ceased operations. Private and charter helicopter flights to Tresco were still welcomed by the owner, by prior arrangement.

In 2016, plans were announced for a new helicopter service between a new Penzance Heliport and the Isles of Scilly. The service launched in March 2020 and flights now operate into both St Mary's Airport and Tresco Heliport under the name of Penzance Helicopters, operated by Sloane Helicopters.

== Airlines and destinations ==
Airlines	Destinations
Starspeed	Penzance

== See also ==
- St Mary's Airport (Isles of Scilly)
