= Sumburgh =

Coordinates: 59.867°N 1.283°W

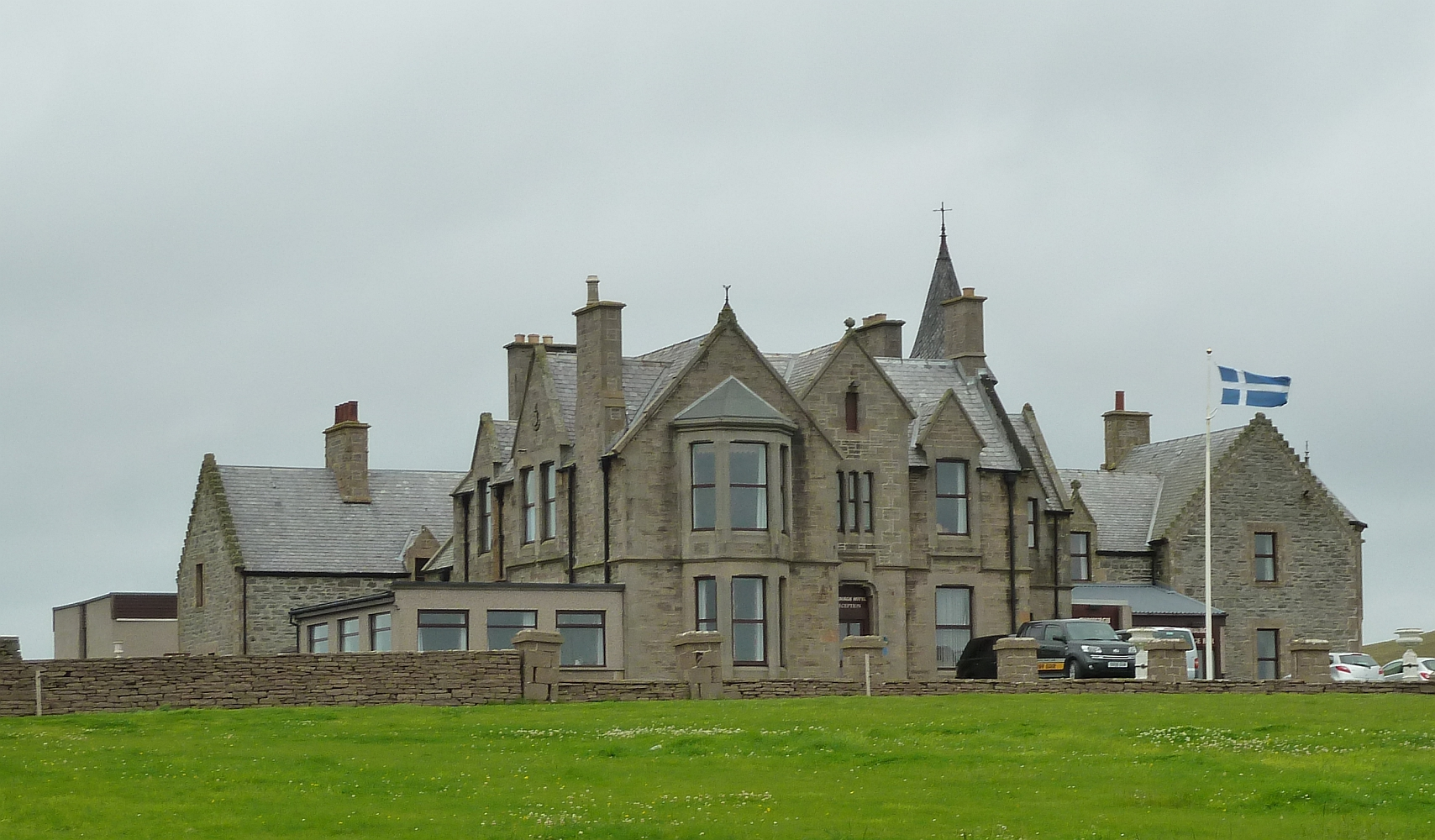
- Sumburgh Hotel

- Location within Shetland
- OS grid reference: HU401092
- Civil parish: Dunrossness
- Council area: Shetland
- Lieutenancy area: Shetland
- Country: Scotland
- Sovereign state: United Kingdom
- Post town: SHETLAND
- Postcode district: ZE3
- Dialling code: 01950
- Police: Scotland
- Fire: Scottish
- Ambulance: Scottish
- UK Parliament: Orkney and Shetland
- Scottish Parliament: Shetland

Sumburgh (Shaetlan pronunciation: [ˈsɔmbrə] SUM-brə) is a small settlement in the Shetland Islands, Scotland, within the parish of Dunrossness.

Sumburgh is located at the south end of the Mainland on Sumburgh Head. Shetland's commercial airport, Sumburgh Airport is located just outside the village to the north. The settlement has a population of approximately 100.

The archaeological site of Jarlshof is situated to the west of Sumburgh, adjacent to Sumburgh Hotel.
