= 1986 British International Helicopters Chinook crash =

Fatal aviation disaster in the Shetland Islands

Sumburgh disaster
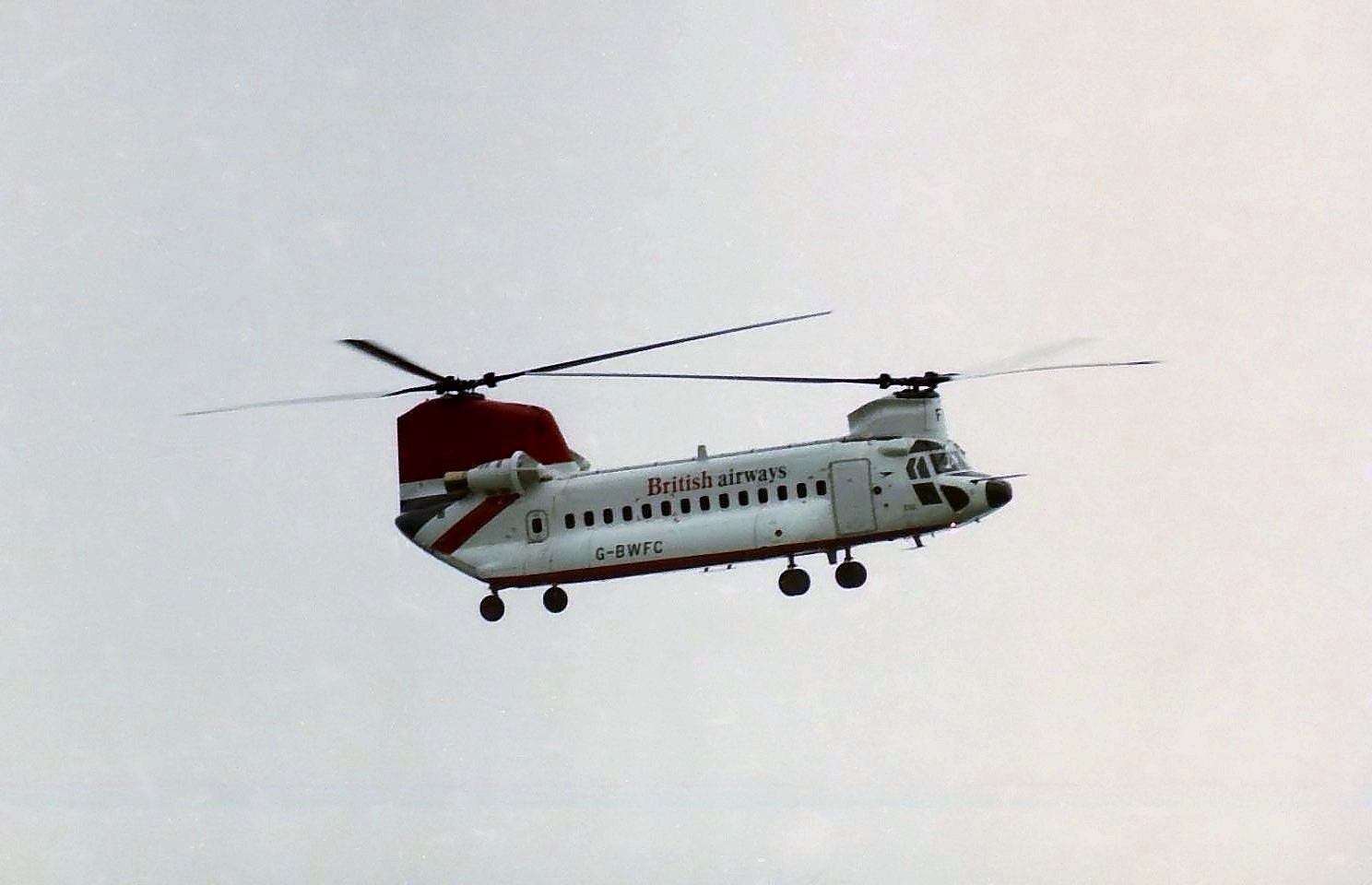
- G-BWFC, the helicopter involved in the accident, photographed in 1982

Accident
- Date: 6 November 1986
- Summary: Mechanical failure
- Site: 2.5 miles east of Sumburgh Airport; 59°53.5′N 1°12′W

Aircraft
- Aircraft type: Boeing-Vertol 234LR Chinook
- Operator: British International Helicopters
- Registration: G-BWFC
- Flight origin: Brent Platform 'C'
- Destination: Sumburgh Airport
- Occupants: 47
- Passengers: 44
- Crew: 3
- Fatalities: 45
- Injuries: 2
- Survivors: 2

On 6 November 1986, a Boeing-Vertol Model 234LR Chinook helicopter returning workers from the Brent oilfield crashed on approach to land at Sumburgh Airport in the Shetland Islands. At 2.5 mi (4.0 km) from the runway the helicopter had a catastrophic forward transmission failure which caused the tandem rotor blades to collide. The helicopter crashed into the sea and sank. Forty-three passengers and two crew members were killed in the crash; one passenger and one crew member survived with injuries.

== Crew ==
The flight crew of the Chinook consisted of Captain Pushp Vaid (45), a former Indian Air Force pilot who joined British International Helicopters in 1975 and started to fly the Chinook in 1982. His co-pilot was First Officer Neville Nixon (43), who left Bristow Helicopters in order to help his wife run a chemist's shop and returned to flying after helping his wife, albeit now working in British International Helicopters. Captain Vaid survived while First Officer Nixon did not.

== Background ==
The helicopter was normally based at Aberdeen Airport but had been based at Sumburgh Airport since 3 November 1986 to operate a shuttle service from the Brent oilfield in the East Shetland Basin. On 6 November the first flight was delayed due to an oil leak from an engine gearbox that was soon rectified and the aircraft left Sumburgh at 08:58 with 40 passengers for the Brent Field. The aircraft visited three platforms with exchanges of freight and passengers then departed Brent Platform C at 10:22 with 44 passengers on board for return to Sumburgh Airport. It transited at a height of 2,500 feet (800 m), and as it approached Sumburgh it was cleared to descend to 1,000 feet (300 m). Reporting 4.5 miles (7.2 km) from the airfield, the controller cleared it to land on helicopter runway 24. Nothing else was heard.

== Accident ==
The voice recorder indicated that the crew noticed an increased noise level in the flightdeck followed by a bang. Despite applying full cyclic pitch control, the aircraft did not respond and fell towards the sea from a height of 150 feet (50 m). The helicopter was largely broken up by the clashing rotor blades in mid air, hit the sea and quickly sank. A Coastguard search and rescue Sikorsky S-61 helicopter which had just departed Sumburgh Airport on a training flight reported liferafts in the sea. It then observed a survivor clinging to a substantial piece of wreckage. While they winched the man on board another survivor was noted among the floating bodies. With no signs of other survivors the Coastguard helicopter flew the survivors to Lerwick for transfer to hospital. An air and sea search failed to find any more survivors but all the floating bodies were recovered and brought to the airport. One of the flight crew and the flight attendant were among the dead.

== Recovery ==
A diving support vessel, the MSV Deepwater 1 (now named Rockwater 1), started a search for the sunken wreckage at 09:00 the following morning. Sea conditions were rough with strong tidal currents and a water depth around 90 metres but the wreckage was located. The monohulled Deepwater 1 struggled to maintain position in the building sea and current conditions. Shell Expro's Multi Services Vessel, the MSV Stadive, arrived and assumed the role of primary recovery vessel and, being a semi-submersible, was able to quickly recover the major components of interest. By the evening of 10 November the cockpit voice recorder, the cockpit section of the fuselage, the rotors and rotor heads, and the gearboxes and associated control systems had been recovered and transferred to the Deepwater 1, which departed for Aberdeen to pass her cargo onwards for analysis by the Air Accidents Investigation Branch (AAIB). The Stadive remained on site and recovered much of the remainder of the fuselage and the bodies of the victims. In all, 44 of the 45 victims' bodies were recovered.

== Cause ==
The accident was caused by the failure of a modified bevel ring gear in the forward transmission which allowed the twin rotors to collide when synchronisation was lost. The AAIB stated that the underlying causes were the inadequacy of a previously accepted test programme and the failure of a stringent inspection programme.

== Safety recommendations ==
The board made three recommendations:

- Certification procedures be reviewed so that all modifications to vital components are adequately scrutinised and tested before approval and more closely monitored after their introduction into service.
- The Civil Aviation Authority should report on the progress that has been made towards the early incorporation of a specification for suitable condition monitoring systems into airworthiness requirements for helicopters and indicate the time scale and scope of likely developments.
- Requirements relating to the ADELT (Automatically Deployable Location Transmitter) equipment, including location, crashworthiness, protection and power supplied, be reviewed in the light of the accident. (The beacon did not operate due to impact damage to the aft part of the aircraft.)

== Aftermath ==
The oil industry decided that the Chinook was too big for the offshore support task and the remaining Chinooks were withdrawn and sold. All surviving aircraft now operate with Columbia Helicopters in heavy lift, non-passenger capabilities.

== See also ==
Other North Sea helicopter incidents:

- Bristow Helicopters Flight 56C (1995)
- Helikopter Service Flight 451 (1997)
- Bond Offshore Helicopters Flight 85N (2009)
- CHC Helikopter Service Flight 241 (2016)

== Sources ==
- World airline accident summary, Cheltenham: UK Civil Aviation Authority, OCLC 7154980, CAA 429
