= HMS Argus =

Nine ships of the Royal Navy and one of the Royal Fleet Auxiliary have been named Argus, after Argus, the hundred-eyed giant of mythology:

- HMS Argus (1799) was a 10-gun sloop, originally a French privateer, captured in 1799 and broken up in 1811.
- HMS Argus was to have been a 36-gun fifth rate. She was ordered in 1812, but cancelled that same year.
- HMS Argus (1813) was an 18-gun Cruizer-class brig-sloop launched in 1813 and sold in 1827. The sale was subsequently cancelled and she was resold in 1828.
- HMS Argus was to have been an 18-gun sloop. She was laid down in 1831, but cancelled later that year.
- HMS Argus (1849) was a wooden-hulled paddle sloop launched in 1849 and broken up in 1881.
- HMS Argus (1851) was a coastguard vessel launched in 1851, renamed HMS Amelia in 1872, and HMS Fanny in 1889. She was hulked in 1899, used as a boom defence vessel from 1902 and was sold in 1907.
- HMS Argus was a coastguard vessel launched in 1864 as HMS Imogene. She was renamed HMS Argus in 1884 and was sold in 1903.
- HMS Argus (1904) was a coastguard vessel launched in 1904, renamed HMS Argon in 1918 and sold in 1920. Renamed Peninnis and operated by the Isles of Scilly Steamship Company from 1920 to 1926. Renamed Riduna and sold to the Alderney Steam Packet Company in 1926. Sent for break-up at Plymouth in 1931.
- HMS Argus (I49) was an aircraft carrier, originally laid down as the Italian liner Conte Rosso. She was purchased in 1916 and launched in 1917. She was on harbour service from 1944 and was sold for breaking up in 1946
- RFA Argus (A135) is a Royal Fleet Auxiliary aviation training and primary casualty receiving ship, previously the container ship MV Contender Bezant, launched in 1981. She was purchased in 1984 and renamed RFA Argus in 1987. She is currently in service.

== See also ==
- HM hired armed lugger Argus was a 14-gun lugger hired in 1794 and captured by a French privateer in the Atlantic in 1799. Argus was at Plymouth on 20 January 1795 and so shared in the proceeds of the detention of the Dutch naval vessels, East Indiamen, and other merchant vessels that were in port on the outbreak of war between Britain and the Netherlands.

== Battle honours ==
- Groix Island 1795
- Ashantee 1873–74
- Arctic 1941
- Atlantic 1941–42
- Malta Convoys 1942
- North Africa 1942
- Kuwait 1991
