= Scillonian IV =

LO-LO PAX Ferry

History
- Name: Scillonian IV
- Owner: Isles of Scilly Steamship Company
- Operator: Isles of Scilly Steamship Company
- Port of registry: St Mary's
- Builder: Piriou Shipyard, Vietnam
- Laid down: 6 November 2024
- Launched: 28 March 2026
- In service: March 2027 (scheduled)
- Identification: IMO number: 1056355
- Status: Under construction

General characteristics
- Type: Passenger ferry
- Tonnage: 2,200 GT
- Length: 74.85 m (245 ft 7 in)
- Beam: 12.80 m (42 ft 0 in)
- Draught: 3.00 m (9 ft 10 in)
- Speed: 18 kn (33 km/h)
- Capacity: 600 passengers
- Crew: 20

Scillonian IV is an under construction passenger ship to be based at Penzance in Cornwall, England, operated by the Isles of Scilly Steamship Company for the principal ferry service to the Isles of Scilly.

== History ==
In September 2023 the Scillonian IV was ordered as a replacement for Scillonian III. The new vessel, designed by BMT, will be 72 metres (236 ft 3 in) long and carry 600 passengers. It will be able to travel at 18 knots (33 km/h; 21 mph) and is designed specifically to improve passenger comfort.

The Isles of Scilly Steamship Group signed contracts with Piriou in January 2024 for the construction of both Scillonian IV and cargo ship Menawethan in Vietnam. It was laid down on 6 November 2024 and launched on 28 March 2026. It is scheduled to enter service in 2027.

== See also ==
- Scillonian (1925)
- Scillonian (1955)
