= Motor launch (naval) =

Type of small Royal Navy vessel used by British Coastal Forces

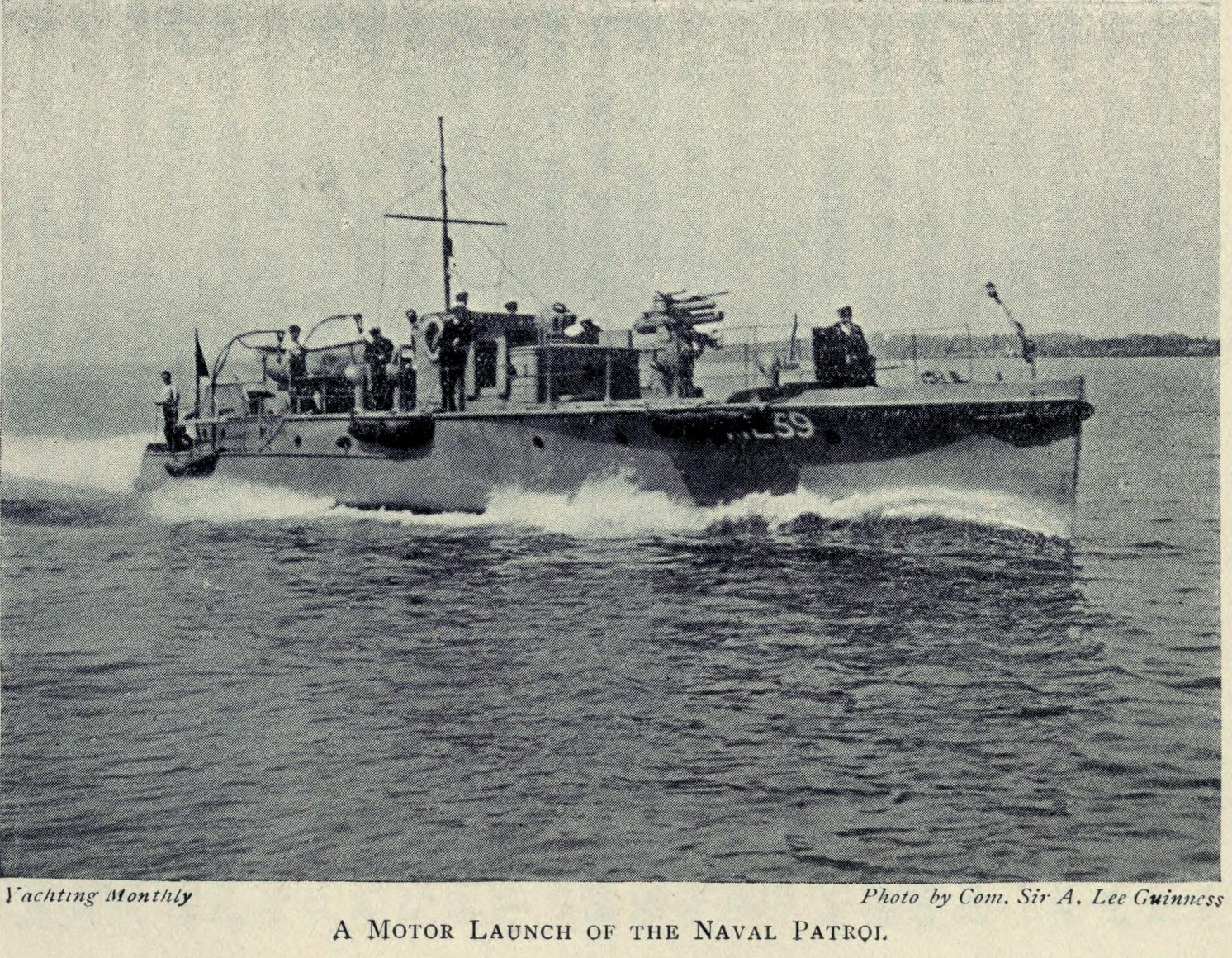
- A WW I motor launch - ML 59

Class overview
- Builders: Elco
- Operators: Royal Navy
- Built: 1915–1918
- In commission: 1915–1920s
- Completed: 580

General characteristics ML.1–50 series
- Type: Motor launch
- Displacement: 34 t
- Length: 75 ft (23 m)
- Propulsion: Petrol engine
- Speed: 19 kn (35 km/h)
- Complement: 8
- Armament: 1 × 13-pdr; later replaced with 1 × 3-pdr; depth charges

General characteristics ML.51–550 series
- Type: Motor launch
- Displacement: 37 t
- Length: 86 ft (26 m)
- Propulsion: Petrol engine
- Speed: 19 kn (35 km/h)
- Complement: 6
- Armament: 1 × 13-pdr; later replaced with 1 × 3-pdr; depth charges

General characteristics ML.551–580
- Type: Motor launch
- Displacement: 37 t
- Length: 80 ft (24 m)
- Speed: 19 kn (35 km/h)
- Complement: 8
- Armament: 1 × 13-pdr gun; later replaced with 1 × 3-pdr

A motor launch (ML) is a small military vessel in Royal Navy service. It was designed for harbour defence and submarine chasing. Similar vessels were used by the Royal Air Force for armed high-speed air-sea rescue. Some vessels for water police service are also known as motor launches. Motor launches were slower than motor torpedo boats and motor gun boats.

== World War I service ==
Although small by naval standards, it was larger than the preceding steam or diesel-engined harbour launches of 56 ft and coastal motor boats of 40 and 55 ft length. The first motor launches entered service in the First World War. These were five hundred and eighty 80-foot-long (24 m) vessels built by the US Elco company for the Admiralty, receiving the numbers ML-1 to ML-580. They served with the Royal Navy between 1916 and the end of the war, defending the British coast from German submarines. Some of the earliest examples, including ML 1, also served in the Persian Gulf from June 1916. After the Armistice of 11 November 1918 a flotilla of 12 Royal Navy motor launches travelled down the Rhine performing duty as the Rhine Patrol Flotilla. The only known surviving example of a World War I era motor launch is ML-286, which now lies in a poor condition on the banks of the River Thames.

== World War II types ==
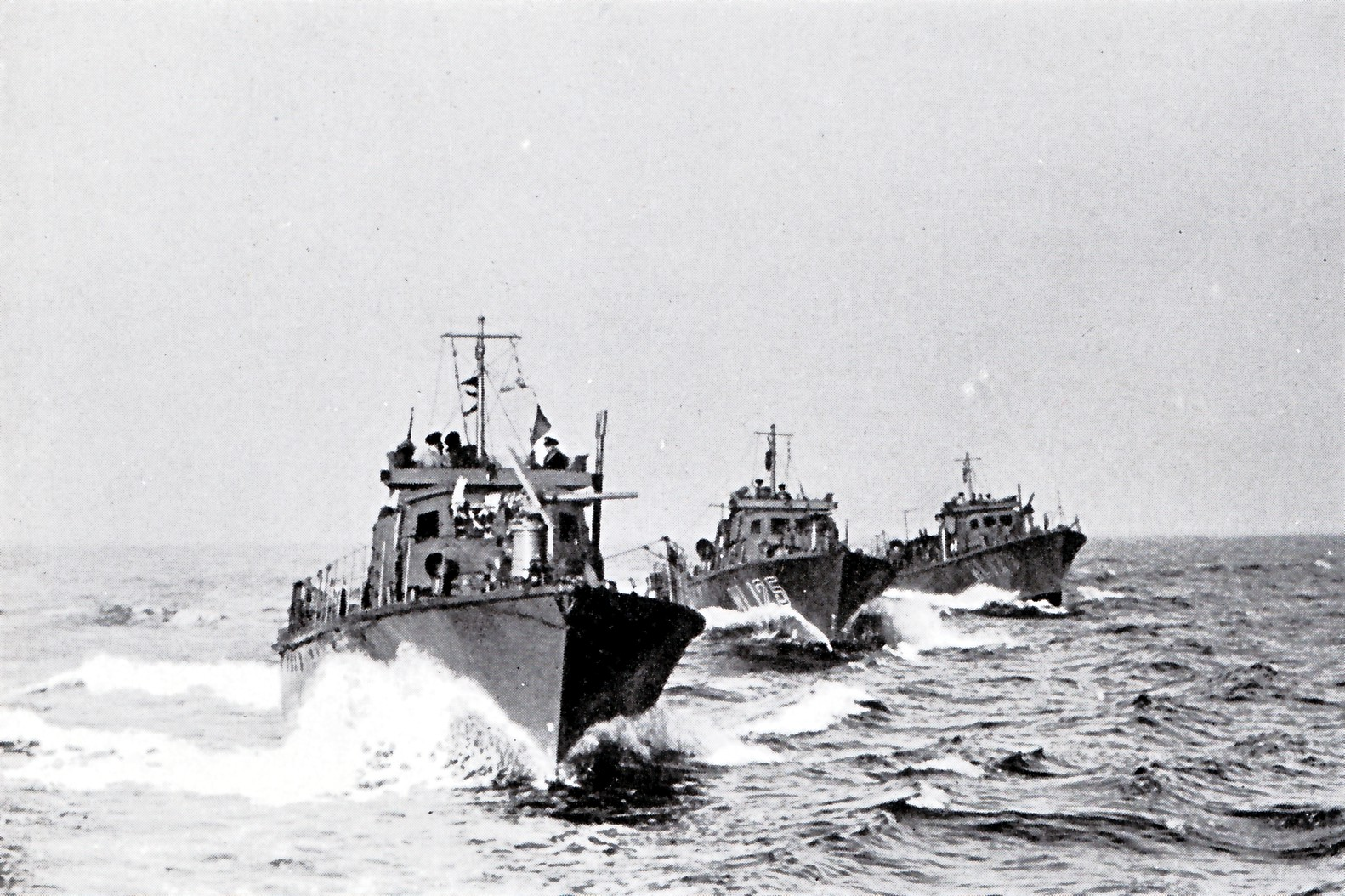
Royal Norwegian Navy Fairmile B motor launches off Dover 1940–1941.

Examples
Type	Length	Weight	Speed	Built	Total	Lost	Designed for
Fairmile A motor launch	110 ft (34 m)	57 tons	25 kn (46 km/h; 29 mph)	1939	12		Submarine chasing, later minelaying
Fairmile B motor launch	112 ft (34 m)	85 tons	20 kn (37 km/h; 23 mph)	1940–45	1,284		Submarine chasing, many later roles including air-sea rescue
Harbour defence motor launch	72 ft (22 m)	54 tons	12 kn (22 km/h; 14 mph)	1940–45	486	47	Defending harbours; anti-submarine
BPBC Type Two 63 ft high speed launch "Whaleback"	63 ft (19 m)	21.5 tons	36 kn (67 km/h; 41 mph)	1940–1942	70		RAF air-sea rescue downed aircrew, particularly in the English Channel

The BPBC Type Two was succeeded by the Type Three 68 ft "Hants and Dorset".

Post-war, many motor launches were taken on as pleasure boats. A number of them are on the National Register of Historic Vessels.

== See also ==
- Harbour launch
- High-speed launch
- Motor gunboat
- Motor torpedo boat
- Coastal Forces of the Royal Navy
- R boat – German World War II equivalent
- Dark-class fast patrol boat
