= Motor ship =

Ship propelled by an internal combustion engine

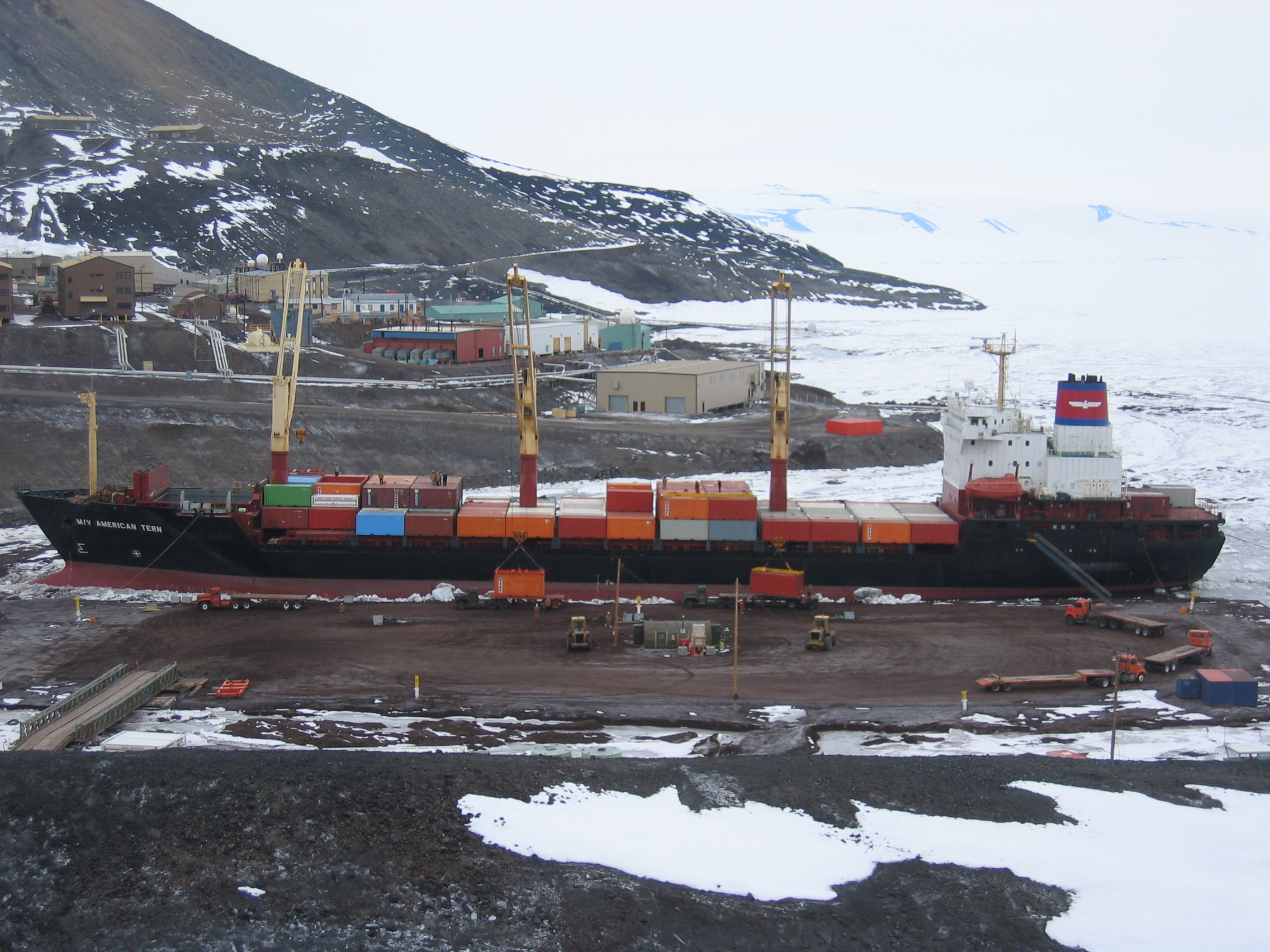
The supply ship MV American Tern during cargo operations at McMurdo Station in Antarctica in 2007

A motor ship or motor vessel is a ship that is propelled by an internal combustion engine, usually a diesel engine. The names of motor ships are often prefixed with MS, M/S, MV or M/V.

Engines for motorships were developed during the 1890s, and by the early 20th century, motorships began to cross the waters.

== History ==
The first diesel-powered motorships were launched in 1903: the Russian Vandal (the first equipped with diesel-electric transmission) and French Petite-Pierre. There is disagreement over which of the two was the first.

Although merchant, commercial and private vessels have been inconsistently designated, the general official practice in the British Realm and former British colonies (whether today part of the Commonwealth or not) has been to designate the very largest (ocean going) vessels as "ships", the very smallest as "boats", and those intermediate steamers and other types too large to be considered boats and too small to be seen as ships, as "vessels". This is particularly true with naval vessels, where those large enough to be rated ships (the Royal Navy designation for a commissioned ship, regardless of propulsion, being "HMS" for "His/Her Majesty's Ship") are generally under the command of a ranked Captain (for a destroyer or above), or a Commander, while the smallest warships and intermediate vessels (such as trawlers and drifters) and large "boats" (such as Motor Torpedo Boats prefixed MTB and Motor Gun Boats prefixed MGB), and smaller launches (such as the Harbour Defence Motor Launch prefixed HDML, and Motor Launches like the Fairmile Type B prefixed ML) might be commanded by a Commander, Lieutenant-Commander, Lieutenant, or Skipper (still smaller boats, such as the Harbour Launch, prefixed HL, might be commanded by a Warrant Officer, Petty Officer, or a senior rating). Although intermediate commercial and research vessels are generally prefixed MV (with internal combustion motors), RV (such as the FRV Scotia of the Fisheries Research Services), or similar, the Royal Navy has generally avoided using the word vessel (rare examples being Steam Tank Vessels and Water Tank Vessels), instead prefixing such vessels based on the application they were designed for (not necessarily the application the Royal Navy used them for), such as Admiralty Trawlers, prefixed HMT ("His Majesty's Trawler"), Admiralty Drifters, and Admiralty tugs, all often designated as Auxiliary Craft.

== See also ==
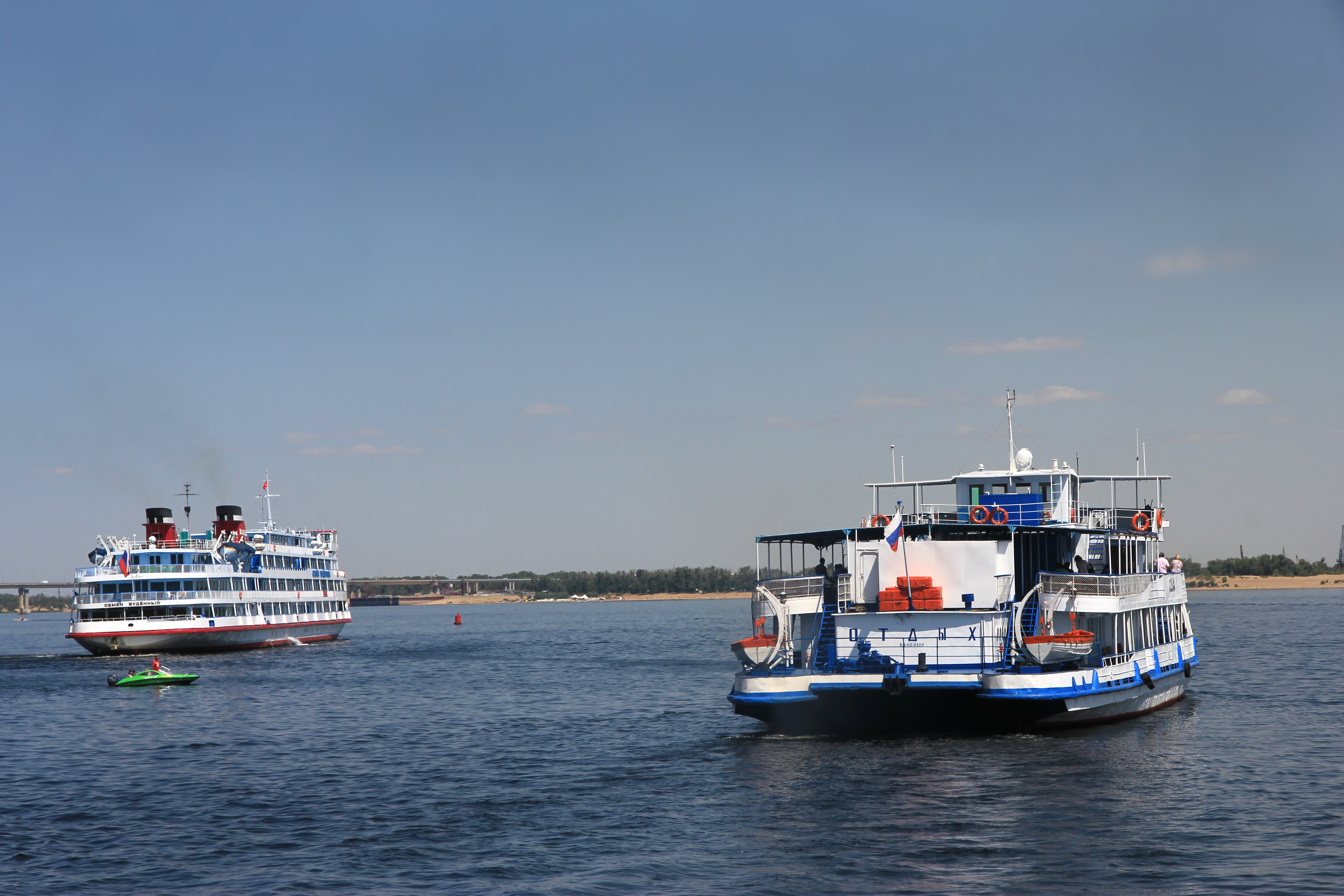
Cruise ships on the Volga River, Russia

- Gas turbine ship (GTS) – prefix for a jet-engine/turbine-propelled ship
- Steamship (SS) – a steamship is a ship propelled by a steam engine or steam turbine. The name of steam ships are often prefixed with SS or S/S
- Royal Mail Ship (RMS) – Royal Mail Ship
