= Motor Launch ML-286 =

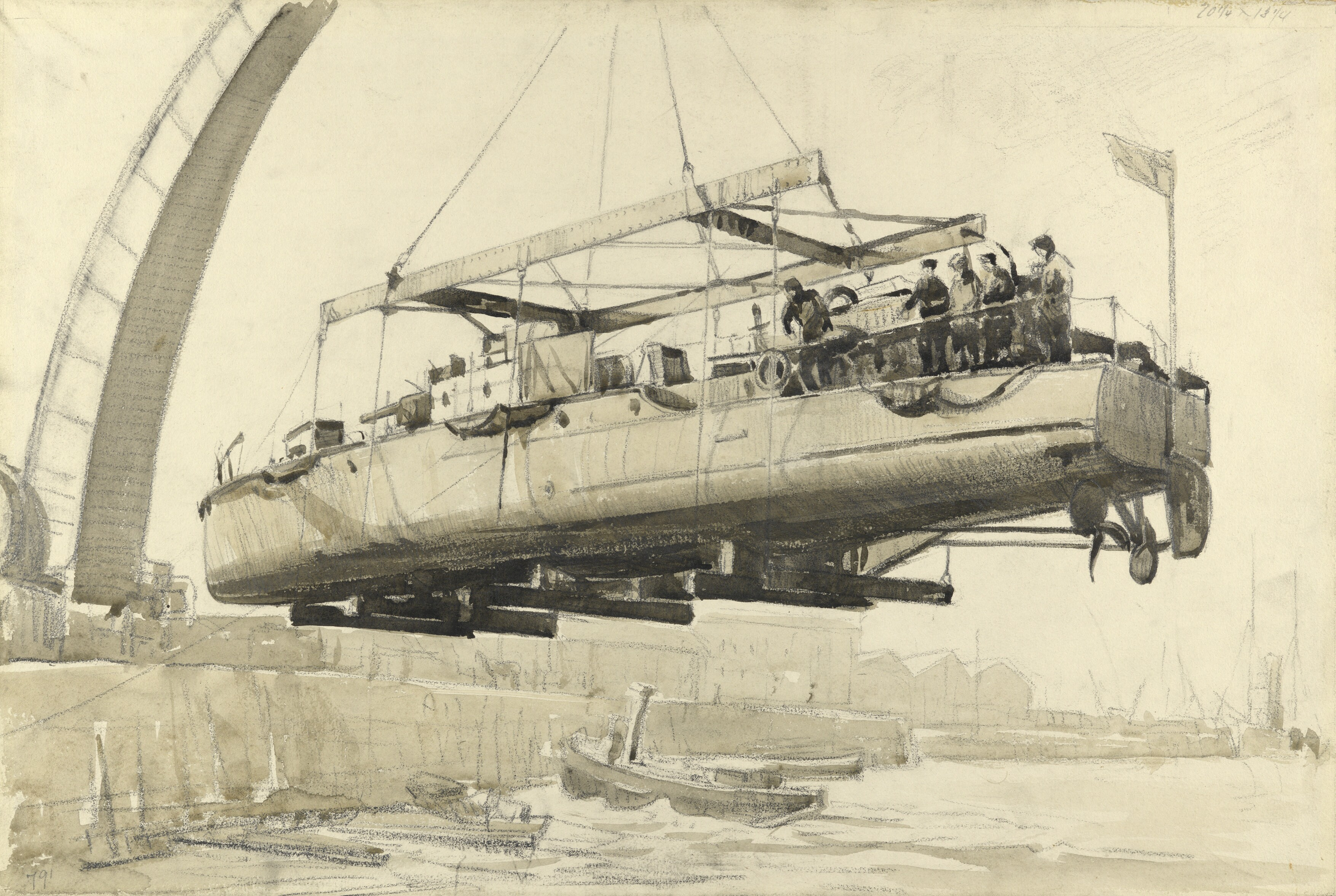
- Motor Launch of the same type drawn by Lieutenant Geoffrey Allfree

General characteristics ML.1–50 series
- Type: Motor Launch
- Displacement: 37 tons
- Length: 80 ft (24 m)
- Draught: 4 ft (1.2 m)
- Propulsion: 2 × 220hp 4cyl petrol engine
- Speed: 19 kn (35 km/h)
- Complement: 8
- Sensors & processing systems: Hydrophone
- Armament: 1 × 13-pounder; later replaced with 1 × 3-pounder; depth charges

Motor Launch ML-286 is a First World War submarine chaser built by Elco, that saw action with Royal Navy. It is also listed as one of the Little Ships that were in the 1940, Dunkirk evacuation. It is in a very poor condition and lies on the banks of the River Thames at Isleworth Ait. ML-286 is the last surviving Royal Naval Motor Launch of the more than 550 that served in the First World War.

== World War I service ==
The first motor launches entered service in the First World War. These were 580 80-foot-long (24 m) vessels built by the US Elco company for the Admiralty, receiving the designations ML–1 to ML–580. They served between 1916 and the end of the war with the Royal Navy defending the British coast from German submarines. Her first commander was the War artist, Lieutenant Geoffrey Allfree (1889–1918)

== Dunkirk and post-war ==
After the War ML286 was sold off by the Ministry and was given the name Cordon Rouge and then later, in 1930 she became Eothen which was her name at Dunkirk. She returned to Ramsgate and was towed to Teddington. She was requisitioned for service as an auxiliary patrol vessel in the Thames but found to be unsuitable and later was returned to her owners in August 1940.

== Current condition ==
Eothen (ML-286) lies in a very poor condition on the banks of the River Thames. It is being monitored and recorded by volunteer members of the Thames Discovery Programme (TDP) based at Museum of London Archaeology (MOLA).

== See also ==
- Coastal Motor Boat
- Torpedo boat
- Harbour Defence Motor Launch
- Coastal Forces of the Royal Navy
