= RMV Scillonian III =

LO-LO PAX Ferry

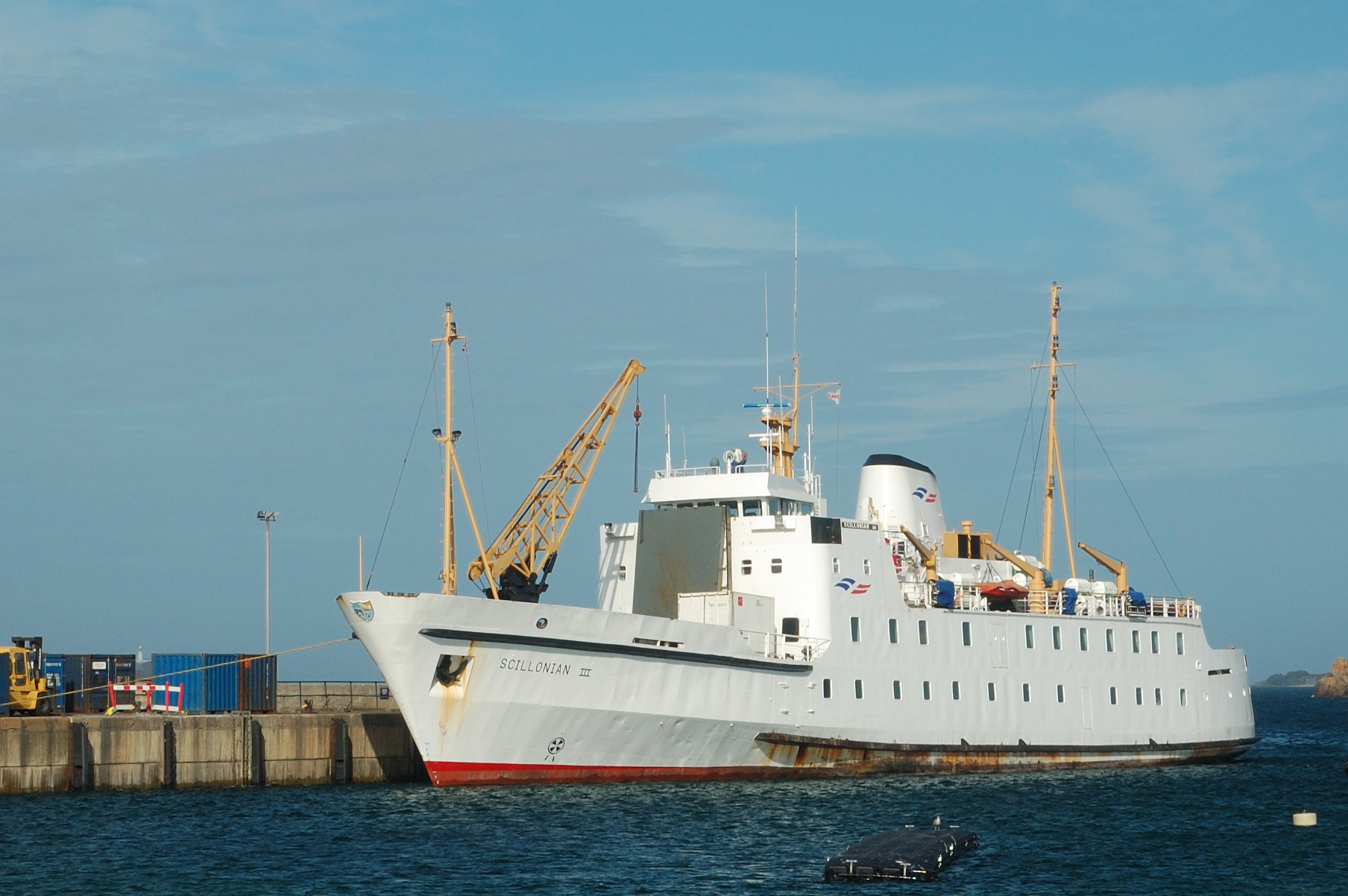
- Scillonian III unloading cargo at St Mary's Harbour

History
- Name: RMV Scillonian III
- Owner: Isles of Scilly Steamship Company
- Operator: Isles of Scilly Steamship Company
- Port of registry: St Mary's
- Builder: Appledore Shipbuilders, England
- Yard number: 421
- Launched: 5 May 1977
- Christened: 17 May 1977
- In service: 19 May 1977
- Out of service: 8 November 2026
- Identification: IMO number: 7527796
- Status: Operating between Penzance and Hugh Town

General characteristics
- Type: Passenger ferry
- Tonnage: 1,255.25 GRT
- Length: 68 m (223 ft 1 in)
- Beam: 11.85 m (38 ft 11 in)
- Draught: 2.89 m (9 ft 6 in)
- Decks: 5
- Propulsion: 2 Blackstone & Co engines driving; 2 fixed pitch 4-blade bronze propellers; 3 Volvo Penta diesel generators; 1 diesel emergency generator
- Speed: 15.15 kn (28.1 km/h)
- Capacity: 485 passengers
- Crew: 18

RMV Scillonian III was a passenger ship based at Penzance in Cornwall, England, operated by the Isles of Scilly Steamship Company. She operated the principal ferry service to the Isles of Scilly and was one of only three ships in the world still carrying the status of Royal Mail Ship (hence RMV – Royal Mail Vessel). She began her service in 1977 and retired on 8 November 2026.

== History ==
RMV Scillonian III was purpose built by Appledore Shipbuilders of Appledore, North Devon and was christened by Prince Charles, Duke of Cornwall on 17 May 1977 and entered service later in the same month. She is the third passenger ship to carry the Scillonian name and made her first trip to Scilly on 19 May 1977, sailing from Bideford to St Mary's. On the arrival of the new ship, critics found it "too big, they will never hold her, not suitable or not as good a sea boat as the old boat" (the same had happened when the first Scillonian went into service in 1926 and again with her replacement in 1956).

Scillonian III has a length of 68 m (223 ft 1 in), a beam of 11.85 m (38 ft 11 in), a draught of 2.89 m (9 ft 6 in), and assessed at 1,255.25 gross tonnage (GT) with a service speed of 15.15 knots (28.06 km/h; 17.43 mph). Due to the number of tidal currents which meet off Land's End, and the need for a shallow draught to allow access to the islands, the sea journey can be rough, causing sea sickness. For this reason, the ship is fitted with a "flume" antiroll stabiliser system. The ship is also designed to have a shallow draft and can sit on the seabed when there is insufficient water.

Scillonian III is currently in service for passengers and cargo eight months of the year, carrying up to 485 passengers (the current licensed limit) for day trips or longer holidays to the islands. As a preferred means of transport between Scilly and the mainland, she is a familiar sight in Penzance and St Mary's, often photographed by tourists and also featured in the BBC series, An Island Parish.

In 1998, faced with the cost of building a new ship, the company decided to give Scillonian III a major refit, during which over 50 tons of steel were used to increase the standard of the ship. The ship also had three new generators and a new bow thruster fitted. The cost was £1.7 million. In early 2007, press reports indicated that Cornwall County Council was expected to approve plans for the construction of a new ro-ro ferry at a cost of £17.5 million. This vessel would be leased to the Isles of Scilly Steamship Company and would replace both Scillonian III and Gry Maritha. The scheme subsequently collapsed.

During the winter of 2012–13 the ship underwent a £2 million overhaul which refurbished the passenger accommodation and also extended the ship's service life to 2018. The ship's 40th anniversary was in May 2017 and during that time she has made more than 9,000 return journeys, travelled more than 648,000 nautical miles (1,200,000 km) and carried more than 1,458,000 passengers.

The ship last sailed from the Isles of Scilly on 8 November 2026, leaving St. Mary's harbour whilst being watched by many teary-eyed islanders.

== Schedule ==
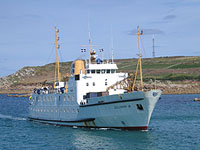
Scillonian III approaching St Mary's harbour

From new in 1977 Scillonian III operated a year-round route through all weather conditions to service the cargo and passenger transport to and from Penzance and the island of St. Mary's, in the Isles of Scilly. At that time she would run a regular single daily service on weekdays leaving at 0915 from Penzance and then returning to Penzance from St. Mary's leaving at 1530. On Saturdays she was scheduled to run a double service leaving earlier in the morning and making a quick turnaround at lunchtime in St. Mary's and then performing a second return voyage in the afternoon. In 1990 it was decided to change the service and only run a seasonal operation. The Isles of Scilly Steamship Company Ltd. later purchased a smaller cargo vessel purely for freight and Scillonian III was put into maintenance and repair during the winter months.

Scillonian III now runs between Penzance and Hugh Town, St. Mary's for about eight months only, from early spring (March/April) until autumn (October/November). Through the winter months, she is laid up in Penzance Harbour and a cargo-only service to the Isles of Scilly is then provided by Gry Maritha. The annual winter period is used to carry out a maintenance programme, during which Scillonian III is painted and undergoes technical inspections as well as surveys for passenger vessel certification by the Maritime & Coastguard Agency. The ferry's season thus largely coincides with the tourist season on the Isles of Scilly, which normally runs from Easter to the first weekend in October. The ferry is in fact so closely associated with the summer season on Scilly that for many people, "the sight of the ship Scillonian III [arriving in the Isles of Scilly] is a celebrated indication that spring has sprung."

During her months of operation, Scillonian III follows a regular schedule. The ferry normally sails six days a week from Monday to Saturday, typically leaving Penzance at 09:15 am and arriving in Hugh Town around 12:00 noon, which means a sailing time of approximately 2 hours 40 minutes. This is the vessel's standard schedule, which only sees occasional variations on Saturdays. On most days, when Scillonian III sails from the UK mainland at 09:15, she will stay in Hugh Town until 16:30.

On some occasions, when changing tides or weather forecasts affect her sailings so that she has to leave Penzance at about 10:30, she will leave Hugh Town again around 15:00, and on the few days when she needs to sail from Penzance at about 08:30, she will depart Hugh Town at about 11:15. Times and dates may also change due to school holidays, special occasions and unexpected events. Two sailings a day, Sunday or night sailings are rare and usually only arranged by the Steamship Company when an exceptionally high number of passengers depend on the ferry service. This may be the case on busy weekends at the start of the summer season, around the World Pilot Gig Championships, and more regularly during the year when the air services between the Isles of Scilly and the mainland are grounded due to poor visibility (see "Notable events" below).

Scillonian III was part of the emergency response and civil contingency for incidents occurring on the Isles of Scilly.

== Notable events ==
On 26 March 1997, when the 300-ft container vessel Cita hit rocks off the south coast of the Isles of Scilly, the crew of the stricken vessel were rescued by St Mary's Lifeboat with the support of a helicopter from RNAS Culdrose. They returned to the UK mainland on board Scillonian III later that afternoon. As air traffic to Scilly was suspended for the day due to poor visibility on the mainland, the government authorities chartered the Scillonian III to make a night sailing from Penzance to bring officials, shipwreck specialists and police reinforcements to St Mary's.

On 12 August 2002, Scillonian III could not sail because of a technical fault, leaving hundreds of tourists temporarily stranded on St Mary's. The ferry had to remain docked in Penzance while engineers worked on the fault. Travellers booked in for the sailing were advised to make alternative arrangements; however British International and Skybus services struggled to cope with the massive extra demand for seats, the problem made worse by one of British International's two helicopters being grounded. Cancellation of Scillonian III's sailing mainly affected day trip passengers to Scilly and visitors staying in guesthouses, as in many cases they could not be re-accommodated in the same guesthouse. Freight services to St Mary's were also disrupted by the cancellation, so Gry Maritha had to make a rescheduled Monday night sailing to deliver fruit and vegetables to the Isles of Scilly.

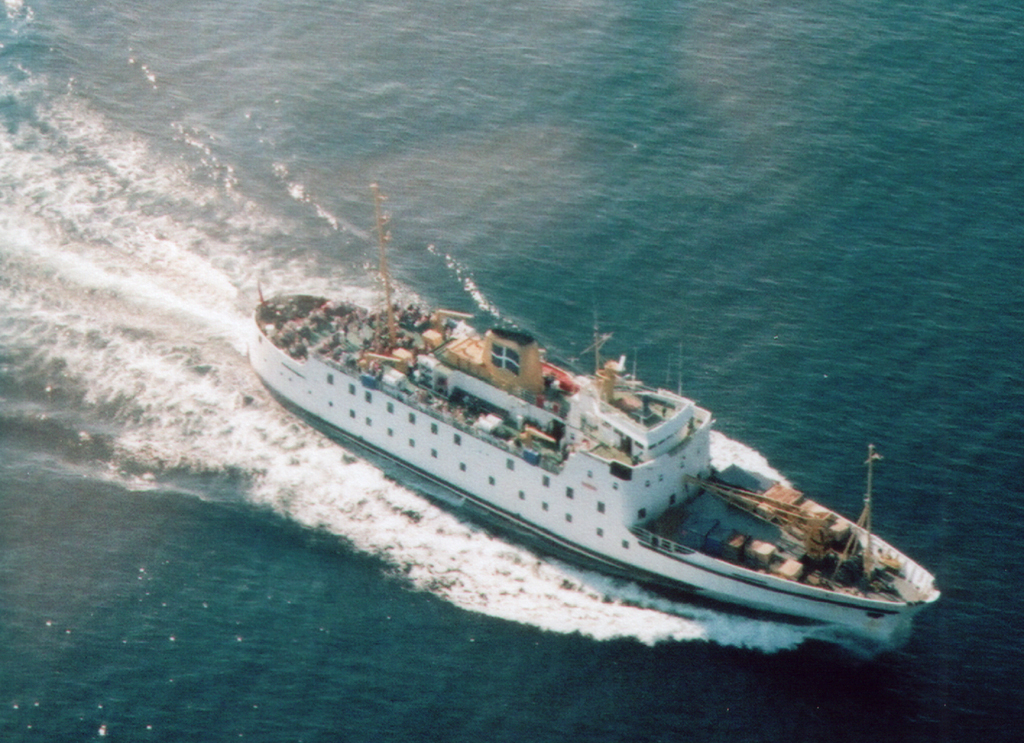
Scillonian III, as seen from the air, halfway between St Mary's and Penzance

On 17 June 2010, a Scilly shrew made headlines on BBC Cornwall when it stowed away from the Isles of Scilly on Scillonian III. The small 51 mm (2 in) mammal was discovered in a corner of the Upper Deck as the ferry was about to arrive in Penzance and staff were clearing the area near the gangway. Paul Semmens, the Isles of Scilly Wildlife Trust's onboard marine guide, identified the animal as a shrew about two months old and looked after it for the night. The next day, the shrew was flown back from Penzance to Scilly on a Skybus plane and released back into its natural environment. Managers at the Isles of Scilly Steamship Company said they thought it could have been the smallest passenger ever to travel on Scillonian III and the Skybus.

On 21 April 2011, Scillonian III was issued with her new certificate by the Maritime & Coastguard Agency so her carrying capacity of 600 passengers could be reinstated. This came in time for the start of the summer season on the Isles of Scilly and the World Pilot Gig Championships. On 2 May, the cancellation of a Scillonian III sailing on the bank holiday after the World Pilot Gig Championships weekend left visitors stranded on St Mary's. Two sailings were scheduled that day to take gig rowers home. Scillonian III departed for the first sailing as planned, but with weather conditions worsening in the strong Easterlies and waves crashing onto the pier in Penzance it became unsafe to berth and she had to spend three hours circling in Mount's Bay, waiting until high tide with 450 passengers on board. When the second sailing was then cancelled, council staff opened up emergency accommodation at their Carn Thomas offices and Town Hall to provide shelter for visitors stranded on St Mary's. On 29 June, a passenger had to be airlifted from Scillonian III by a rescue helicopter from RNAS Culdrose after complaining about severe chest pains. The day trip visitor had become unwell around 30 minutes out of Penzance, so a doctor travelling on board asked for the helicopter. The ferry retreated to a more sheltered part of the coast, near Mousehole, so the patient could be winched up without having to cope with the strong winds.

On 24 May 2013, Scillonian III ran aground in St Mary's Harbour after being caught by a gust of wind, while attempting to berth by normal approach at low tide. The captain was intending to retreat and wait for the tide to rise when wind blew her shoreward and she made contact with the bottom, stranding 203 passengers for more than an hour. Two moorings were lost as a result and a smaller boat received superficial damage, but nobody was hurt and a later inspection by divers revealed that there was no damage to the Scillonian III. She left as scheduled at 4.30pm that afternoon.

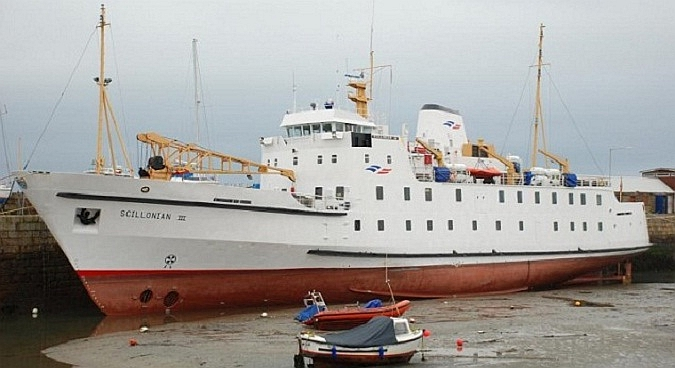
Scillonian III showing shallow draught

On 28 August 2019, Scillonian III had to return to Penzance after she suffered a technical fault mid-crossing which caused the ship to be out of service for four days, leading to significant travel disruption between the islands and mainland. The mechanical issue related to a pump serving both engines' hydraulics and lubrication systems. Engineering teams in Penzance undertook a complex strip down and rebuild process to access and carry out repairs, complicated and further delayed when one of the replacement parts delivered was found to have a hairline fracture and had to be reordered. The Isles of Scilly Steamship Company sought to relieve the situation by using its Skybus service. A total of 52 additional Skybus flights were put on between 28 August and Sunday 1 September, moving approximately 1,100 passengers due to have sailed. However, air capacity was insufficient to move all affected passengers and several hundred people remained on the islands awaiting the resumption of the ferry service. The story of 'stranded passengers' attracted local and national news coverage. The Isles of Scilly Steamship Company issued a statement praising residents and businesses on the islands and its own team members, "for the way they have pulled together in what have been unprecedented circumstances to deal with the issue, support passengers and ensure no one on the islands has been left without proper accommodation." Scillonian III returned to service on 1 September and completed a double sailing on 2 September, clearing the backlog of affected passengers. Normal scheduled sailings resumed on 3 September.

== Replacement ==
Scillonian III is to be replaced by a new vessel, to be named Scillonian IV. The new vessel, designed by BMT, will be 72 m (236 ft 3 in) long and carry 600 passengers. It will be able to travel at 18 knots (33 km/h; 21 mph) and is designed specifically to improve passenger comfort. The Isles of Scilly Steamship Group signed contracts with French shipbuilding company Piriou in January 2024 for the construction of both Scillonian IV and a new freight vessel. The new vessels are expected to enter service in 2027. As of November 2026, the Scillonian IV is on its way from the shipyard in Vietnam.

== Appearance ==
In 1977 Scillonian III went into service with her hull and superstructure painted white, her crane, funnel davits and masts were buff (yellow) without further markings. Some time after Gry Maritha was acquired, Scillonian III's funnel and crane were painted blue to closer match the colours of the other ship, despite the Gry Maritha being a lighter colour blue with a white superstructure. For two seasons after the change of schedule post 1990, the lower half of her hull was painted dark blue with the upper half and superstructure, remaining white. The funnel was painted blue and white striped with a house flag, painted on the sides in the white stripe. The crane, davits and masts were painted blue.

Thereafter the hull was returned to its original white colour with the flag on the side of the funnel becoming a stylized fluttering company house flag without the red lettering. Following customer feedback and comments about the change of colour, the colour scheme was returned to the original white and buff, but with the addition of the fluttering house flag, complete with the red lettering. For much of the first decade of the 21st century, Scillonian III remained in this appearance.

Shortly before the start of the 2010 season, the colours of the ferry's funnel were again changed, this time to white and a black soot ring around the top with a smaller emblem from the marketing material, of the Steamship Company consists of a stylized, flag like, overall shape made up of four quadrant shapes that are not parallel, the left being blue and the right being red. The crane, masts and davits remained in the buff colour.

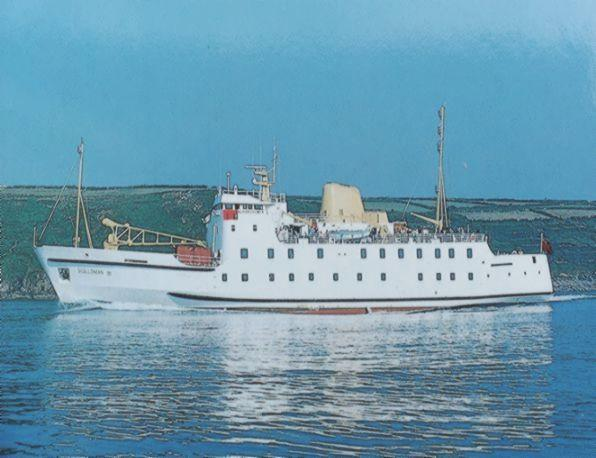
Original funnel

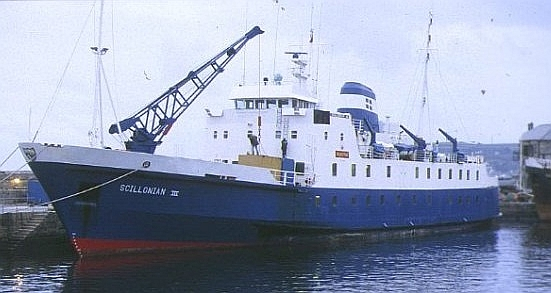
Painted blue

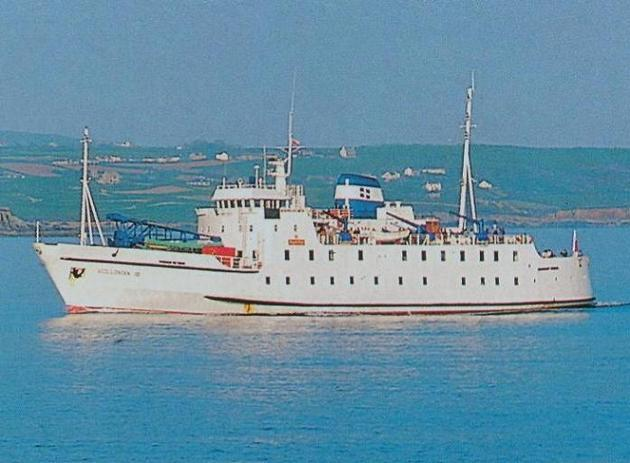
Around 1990

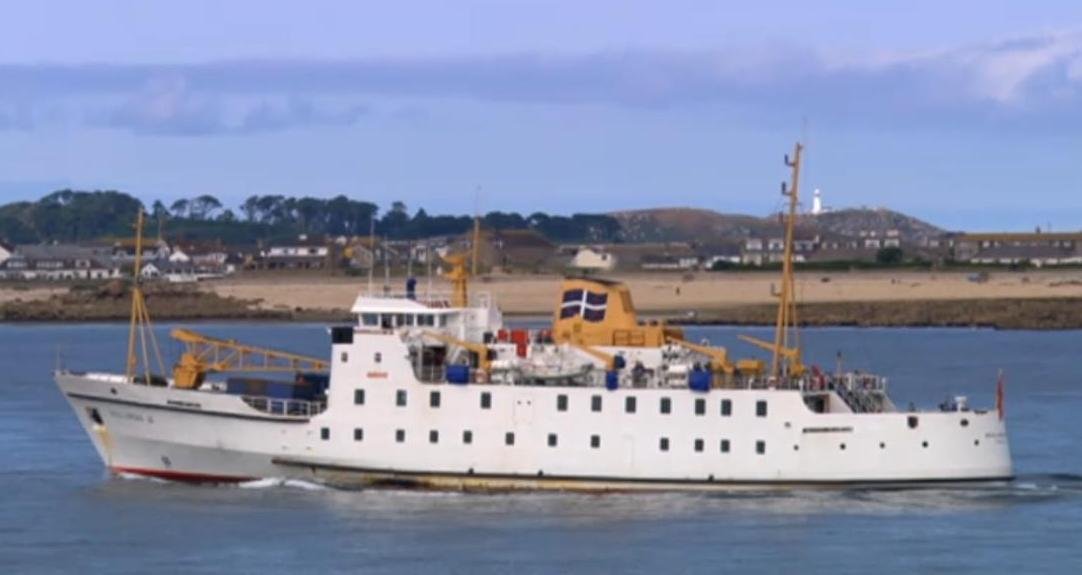
Early 21st century

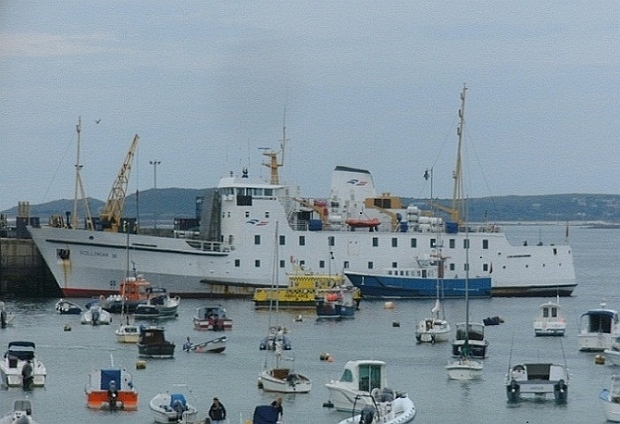
2010 pattern
