= Alderney Steam Packet Company =

Shipping company

- Industry: Shipping
- Founded: 1897
- Defunct: 1931
- Fate: Entered liquidation
- Successor: St. Malo & Binic Steam Ship Company Ltd
- Headquarters: Alderney
- Area served: Alderney, Guernsey, Sark, Cherbourg

The Alderney Steam Packet Company provided shipping services between Alderney and Sark, Guernsey and Cherbourg from 1897 to 1931.

== History ==
=== Courier I and Courier II ===
The origins of the company lie with the construction of the initial vessel Courier I which was launched on 26 February 1876 by the residents of Alderney and Courier II in 1883. Courier II cost £8,000.(equivalent to £841,018 in 2025),. The Couriers were built by Day and Summers, Northam in Southampton.

In 1897 the owners of the two Courier vessels formed the Alderney Steam Packet Company to operate these shipping services.

On 30 April 1906, Courier II struck Les Ânons, a rock south of Jethou. There were 29 survivors and 10 deaths. The ship was salvaged on 1 August 1906 and returned to service after repairs.

In 1913, the Courier I had been sold to Italian owners. She was renamed the Aydon and sailed from Guernsey on 3 February 1913 bound for Naples via Dartmouth. She was then to proceed to Turkey to be used as a passenger steamer in and around Constantinople.

=== Helper ===
In 1920 they purchased Helper, and a regular service to Sark started on 1 April. Helper had been built for the West Cornwall Railway in 1873 by William Allsup of Preston as the Sir Francis Drake. She was renamed Helper in 1908 when a new Sir Francis Drake was introduced. During the First World War she ferried service personnel to Portland Naval Base. In 1919 Helper was sold to Cosens & Co for seasonal excursions out of Weymouth to Lulworth Cove and Lyme Bay. Helper was withdrawn in 1926 and broken up for scrap.

=== RMS Riduna ===
In 1926 they purchased the RMS Peninnis, formerly HMS Argus, from the Isles of Scilly Steamship Company and renamed her the RMS Riduna. Resembling a steam-yacht with a clipper bow, buff funnel and originally a white hull. She was sent for scrap in 1931.

== Closure ==
In 1929 the Alderney Steam Packet Company entered liquidation, but a new company of the same name was registered in Guernsey. However, this new company did not trade for long, as in March 1931 its goodwill and Courier II was acquired by the St. Malo & Binic Steam Ship Company Ltd., which became the Guernsey, Alderney & Sark Steam Ship Company Ltd. to reflect its current trade in May 1933.

== Vessels ==
- Courier I 1883 - 1913 (Sold to Italy and then Turkey)
- Courier II 1883 - 1931 (survived with another company after 1931)
- PS Helper 1920 - 1926
- RMS Riduna 1926 - 1931
