= MV Cita =

German merchant ship wrecked in 1997

Coordinates: 49.911773°N 6.277908°W

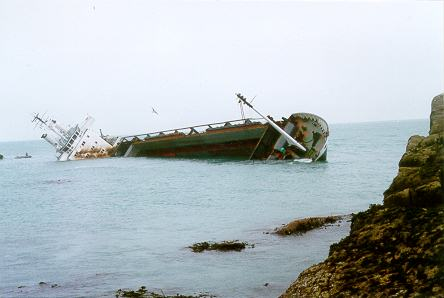
- MV Cita after running aground on Newfoundland Point, Isles of Scilly. This is after the fuel oil and containers were salvaged but before the vessel slid into deeper water.

History
- Name: MV John Wulff
- Builder: Sietas, Neuenfelde, Germany
- Yard number: 767
- Launched: 29 January 1977
- Completed: 1977
- Out of service: 1983
- Identification: IMO number: 7605859
- Fate: Sold
- Name: MV Lagarfoss
- Acquired: 1983
- Out of service: 1996
- Fate: Sold
- Name: MV Cita
- Owner: Martin Shipping Company Ltd
- Operator: Bugsier-Reederei-und Bergungs-Gesellschaft mbH & Co, Hamburg.
- Port of registry: (Antigua and Barbuda) St John's
- Route: Southampton to Belfast
- Acquired: 1996
- Out of service: 1997
- Fate: Wrecked on the Isles of Scilly 26 March 1997.

General characteristics
- Tonnage: 3900
- Length: 93.53 m (306.9 ft)
- Beam: 14.5 m (48 ft)
- Speed: 14 knots (26 km/h)

On 26 March 1997, the 300-ft merchant vessel MV Cita pierced its hull when running aground on rocks off the south coast of the Isles of Scilly in gale-force winds en route from Southampton to Belfast. The incident happened just after 3 am when the German-owned, Antiguan-registered 3,000 tonne vessel hit Newfoundland Point, St Mary's.

== The vessel ==
Of Antiguan and Barbudan registry, the Cita had a gross weight of 3,083 tonnes, 3,900 tonnes deadweight (DWT), and capacity of 241 twenty-foot equivalent units (TEU). Built as a dry cargo vessel in 1976, she was owned and operated by Reederei Gerd A Gorke, Germany and had been converted to a feeder container ship.

== The wreck ==
Approximate position of the wreck

The mainly Polish crew of the stricken vessel were rescued a few hours after the incident by St Mary's Lifeboat, RNLB Robert Edgar (ON 1073) with the support of a Westland Sea King rescue helicopter from RNAS Culdrose. They sailed to the UK mainland on board the Scillonian III later that afternoon.

Many containers were washed up on the rocks and beaches of the Isles of Scilly, and many were found in the Celtic Sea, travelling as far as Cornwall.

Locals were thankful that the wreck was mostly cargo, so the risk of pollution was much less than it could have been, such as in the aftermath of the Torrey Canyon oil spill. The specialist salvage vessel Salvage Chief removed 90 tonnes (98%) of fuel from the Cita before she sank, leaving only a minor oil slick. Oiled sand on Porth Hellick beach, part of the Isles of Scilly SSSI, was removed by excavation. Three tugs were summoned to collect the containers drifting around the Celtic Sea.

The wreck stayed above the surface for several days before sliding off the ledge into the deeper water further from the coast.

=== Salvage and looting ===
The Cita's cargo consisted of 200 containers, twenty of which remained on board. Items such as computer mice, car tyres, tobacco, house doors, plywood, plastic bags, and women's summer shorts were among the contents of containers wrecked around St Mary's. Most locals assisted in the clean-up operation, removing the items from the coastline. Quinnsworth bags, bound for Ireland, were used in shops for months following the wreck of the vessel. A couple of months later, St Mary's Quay had several containers moored alongside by local fisherman, waiting for them to be sold back to the shipping companies or for scrap.

People removing items from the shoreline for their own use could have been faced with prosecution, according to police at the time. Eight extra police were brought over to Scilly from mainland Cornwall to assist, taking notes of who was removing goods. Customs officers said that, under the Merchant Acts of 1894 and 1906, people are obliged to report recovered flotsam to the Receiver of Wreck. There is no known case of police taking up criminal proceedings for the removal of the flotsam.

=== Report ===
According to David Martin-Clark, the reason for the wreck of the ship was "the watch-keeping officer had fallen asleep and the watch alarm had been switched off."

== See also ==
- MSC Napoli - an 4,419 TEU container ship that ran aground in English Channel, Devon, United Kingdom in January 2007. it also sank like the 1997 incident.
