= St. Malo & Binic Steam Ship Company =

St. Malo & Binic Steam Ship Company Ltd
- Industry: Shipping
- Founded: 1897
- Defunct: 1938
- Fate: Entered liquidation
- Successor: Sark Motor Ships Ltd.
- Headquarters: Guernsey
- Area served: Guernsey, Jersey, Binic, St. Malo

The St. Malo & Binic Steamship Company operated shipping services to and from the Channel Islands from 1897 to 1938.

== History ==
In 1897 the Piprell family formed the St. Malo & Binic Steamship Company. They purchased a new steamer Fawn in 1897 to operate their long established freight and passenger service to and from Binic, Brittany, France.

In 1923 they replaced Fawn with a new, larger passenger-cargo vessel, New Fawn, and this gave the company the capability to expand into the summer excursion trade, which was increasing following the end of World War I.

In March 1931 the company acquired the Courier, one of the ships of the recently defunct Alderney Steam Packet Company and took over its business.

=== Guernsey, Alderney & Sark Steam Ship Company ===
In May 1933 it changed its name to the Guernsey, Alderney & Sark Steam Ship Company Ltd. to reflect its current trade.

In August 1938, the company was purchased by Captain J. A. Leighton, owner of the Sark Motor Ships Ltd.

== SS Fawn ==
Fawn was built by John Fullerton and Company, Paisley, as a cargo vessel but she could also carry 59 passengers. Her maiden voyage to St. Malo was on 21 July 1897. As trade expanded she commenced calling at Jersey and linked up to the English coast.

Trade altered as a result of the First World War and a new larger vessel was built in 1923 to cater for the excursion traffic and the larger volume of cargo from England. She was sold as follows:

- 7 May 1923 to Donald Robertson of Glasgow
- 2 June 1927 to John Brown Kee, Ramsey
- 16 May 1940 to the Liverpool Derricking & Carrying Co. Ltd
- 4 October 1940 to the Norwest Construction Co. Ltd.
- 6 November 1941 to James C. Screen, of Appledore.
- 7 March 1947 the Kingsley Shipping & Storage Co. Ltd., Appledore,
- 24 November 1947 the Wirral Shipping Co. Ltd., London. On 9 March 1948 they changed their name to the Wirral Steamship Co. Ltd., London, and on 5 May 1947 she was renamed Wirral Coast.
- 1950 to the Stockton Shipping & Salvage Co. Ltd. at Thornaby-on-Tees

She was broken up 12 March 1951

== SS New Fawn ==
The New Fawn was built by John Fullerton and Company, Paisley, and launched in 1923. She was 287 gross registered tons. Her saloons and cabins could sleep 44 in 4 cabins on sofa berths. She was offered for sale in 1948.
