= Gry Maritha =

United Kingdom-registered cargo ship

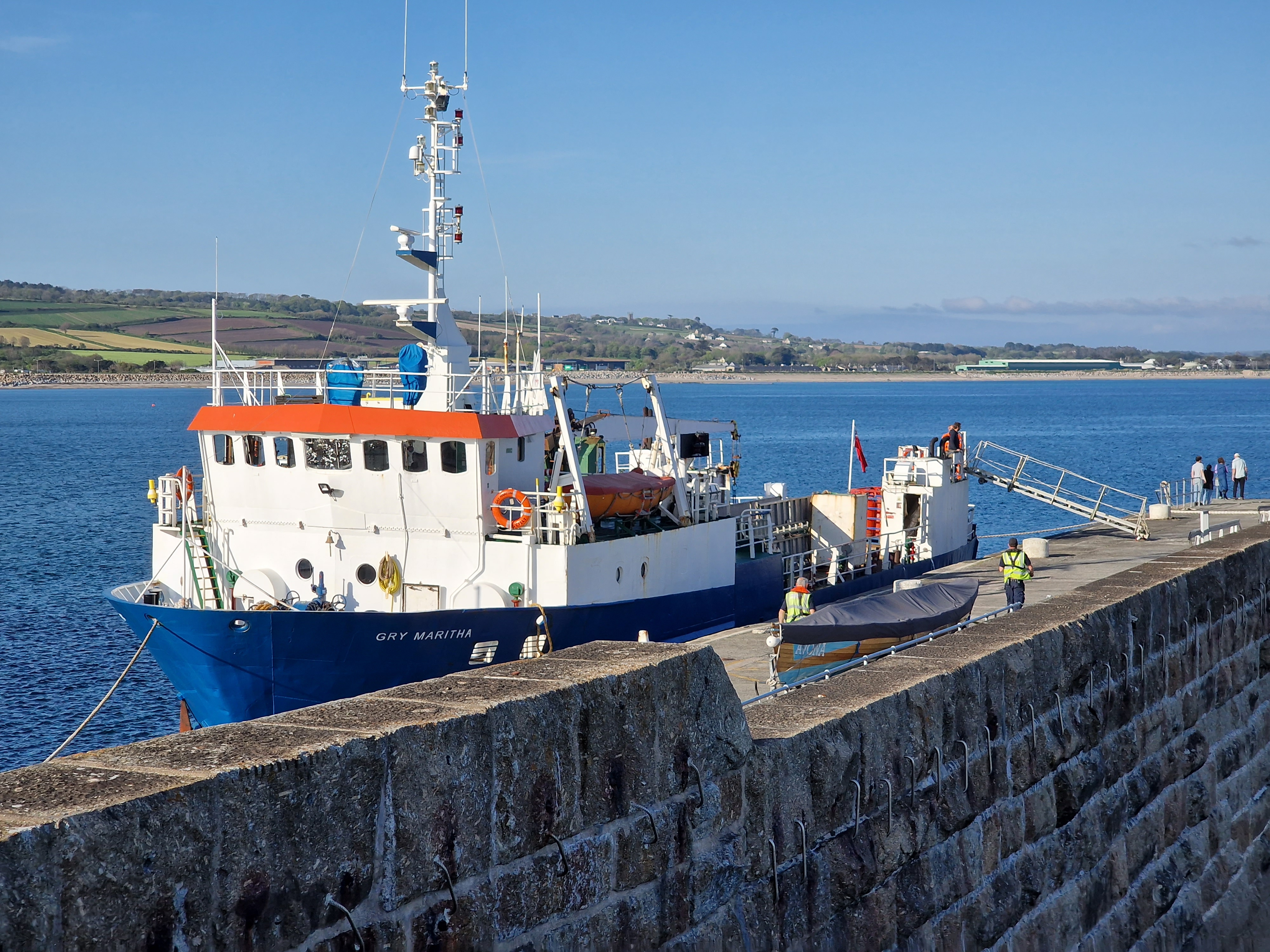
- Gry Maritha at Penzance Harbour

History

Norway
- Name: Gry Maritha
- Port of registry: Namsos, Norway
- Builder: Moen Slip, Norway
- Christened: June 1981
- Completed: 4 July 1981
- In service: 1981
- Out of service: 1989
- Identification: IMO number: 8008462
- Fate: Sold

United Kingdom
- Name: Gry Maritha
- Owner: Isles of Scilly Steamship Company
- Operator: Isles of Scilly Steamship Company
- Port of registry: St Mary's, United Kingdom
- In service: 1989
- Identification: IMO number: 8008462; MMSI number: 232003389
- Status: In service

General characteristics
- Type: Palletised cargo ship
- Tonnage: 590 gross register tons (GRT)
- Length: 37.6 m (123 ft)
- Beam: 9.82 m (32.2 ft)
- Draught: 3.63 m (11.9 ft)
- Decks: 3
- Speed: 8–9 kn (15–17 km/h; 9.2–10.4 mph)
- Capacity: 450 tons deadweight (DWT)
- Crew: 5

Gry Maritha is a freight ship based at Penzance in Cornwall, England, operated by the Isles of Scilly Steamship Company.

== History ==
Gry Maritha was built by Moen Slip in Norway, in 1981. The ship was named after the daughter of the first captain, Tor Sevaldsen.

Purchased in 1989 by the Isles of Scilly Steamship Company, she is a lifeline to the communities on the Isles of Scilly as she provides the only method of bulk freight transport from the United Kingdom mainland. She carries just six passengers and was acquired for all year cargo and winter passenger services, as Scillonian III is laid up through the winter. Between 12,000 and 14,000 tonnes of cargo a year are normally carried by Scillonian III and Gry Maritha.

Gry Maritha carries all the fuel requirements of the Isles of Scilly, using transportable fuel tanks on her deck. These are loaded and unloaded by the deck crane. Towards the stern, the deck can accept standard freight containers. It is scheduled to be replaced by the Menawethan in 2026.
