= Queen of the Isles =

History
- Name: Queen of the Isles (1964–1970); Olovaha (1970–1982); Gulf Explorer (1982–1987); Queen of the Isles II (1987–1992); Island Princess (1992–1994); Western Queen (1994–)
- Owner: Isles of Scilly Steamship Company (1964–1970)
- Builder: Charles Hill & Sons
- Cost: £207,000
- Christened: 16 November 1964
- Identification: IMO number: 6501783
- Fate: Grounded and abandoned c.2001

General characteristics
- Type: Passenger ferry
- Tonnage: 529 GRT
- Length: 156.75 feet (47.78 m)
- Beam: 30.10 feet (9.17 m)
- Installed power: 573 h.p. per screw
- Propulsion: Twin screw
- Speed: 14 knots
- Capacity: 300 passengers

Queen of the Isles was a passenger ferry built for the Isles of Scilly Steamship Company in 1964 by Charles Hill & Sons.

== History ==
The ship was constructed in the Albion Dockyard in Bristol at a cost of £207,000 (equivalent to £3,508,300 in 2023) and named on 16 November 1964 by the Princess Alice, Duchess of Gloucester. She was designed to carry passengers and cargo between Penzance, Cornwall, UK, to the offshore Isles of Scilly, complementing the service provided by the other company ship Scillonian. After running her for the service between Penzance and Scilly from 1964 to 1966, the Isles of Scilly Steamship Company put Queen of the Isles on a range of brief charters, including with P & A Campbell. For two summers she was on charter to shipping firms and during 1970 was hired by a Plymouth company. On two occasions she took passengers from Torquay to Guernsey. In late summer 1970 she was sold for £153,000 (equivalent to £2,008,400 in 2023). The British Government made a gift of her to the Tonga Shipping Agency.

After the installation of air conditioning, from 1970 to 1982 she operated as Olovaha in Tonga and from 1982 to 1987 as Gulf Explorer as a casino ship in Australian waters. She was renamed Queen of the Isles II in 1987 when cruising off the Great Barrier Reef. Renamed Island Princess in 1992 and Western Queen in 1994, she ran aground at Ranadi beach, Honiara, in the Solomon Islands around 2001. In 2010 the hull was cut away to the waterline, the remainder still left there.
