= Isles of Scilly Steamship Company =

Transport company

- Industry: Passenger transportation Freight transportation
- Founded: 1920
- Headquarters: Penzance, Cornwall
- Key people: Stuart Reid (CEO), Ian Howard (Chairman)
- Products: Ferry, fixed wing aircraft, airport, freight vessels
- Services: Ferry service, freight service, airline service
- Website: www.islesofscilly-travel.co.uk
- Footnotes ISSC House Flag

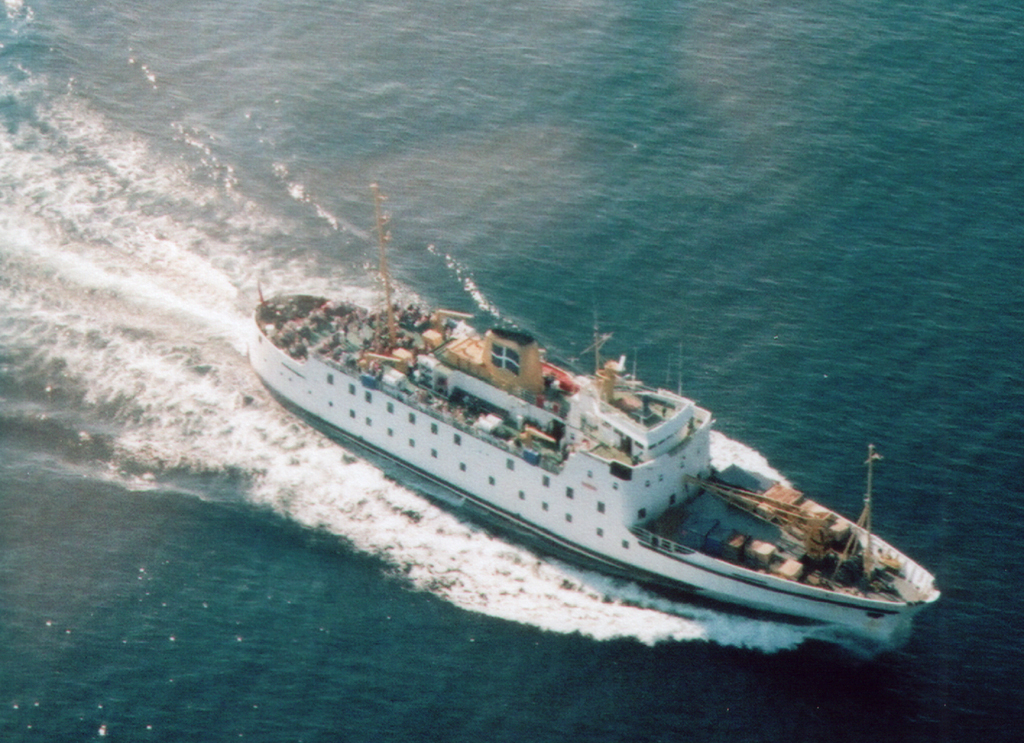
Scillonian III, as seen from the air, halfway between St Mary's and Penzance

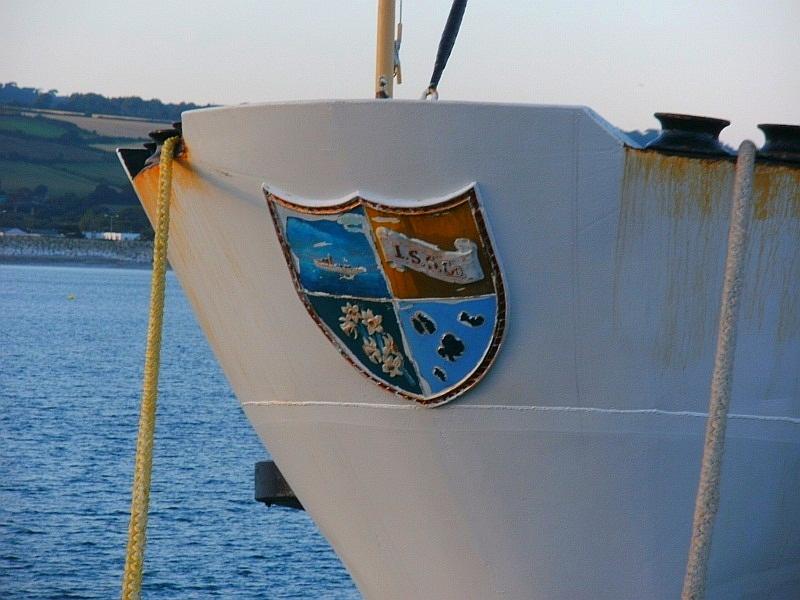
The Steamship Company's coat of arms as displayed on Scillonian III's bow

The Isles of Scilly Steamship Company (ISSC) operates the principal shipping service from Penzance, in Cornwall, to the Isles of Scilly, located 28 miles (45 km) to the southwest. It provides a year-round cargo service together with a seasonal passenger service in summer. The name of the company's principal ferry, the Scillonian III, is perhaps better known than that of the company itself.

The company is based in the Isles of Scilly Travel Centre Penzance. It also owns Isles of Scilly Skybus, an operator of fixed-wing aircraft services to the Isles of Scilly, and sight seeing flights.

In 2010, the company had close to 1,000 shareholders, around half of whom live on the Isles of Scilly. Due to the Isles of Scilly's remote location, the shipping service is often called 'a life line' for the archipelago.

In addition to passengers, 12,000 to 14,000 tonnes of cargo are normally carried by Scillonian III and Gry Maritha every year.

== History ==
From 1858 services were provided by the Scilly Isles Steam Navigation Company which was replaced in 1870 by the West Cornwall Steam Ship Company. This was wound up in 1907 and the services operated by John Banfield until 1917. For the rest of the First World War the services were operated by Government vessels. At the end of the war, a transport vacuum arose when the Ministry of Shipping withdrew the wartime service between St Mary's and Penzance.

On 26 March 1920 the current Isles of Scilly Steamship Company was founded with £20,000 (equivalent to £770,000 in 2025) raised by selling shares, mostly in the Isles of Scilly. The company was formed with the express purpose of securing a regular shipping service between the islands and the mainland. It came into service when the company received its Certificate of Incorporation, giving the right to commence business, dated 27 March 1920.

Initially services were operated by the Peninnis (ex-HMS Argus), which the company purchased from the Admiralty Disposals for £8,000 (equivalent to £310,000 in 2025). Ships Monthly gives an acquisition price of £10,000 (equivalent to £390,000 in 2025) Following the necessary alterations at a cost of £5,000 (equivalent to £190,000 in 2025) this former fishery protection vessel served as the company's ship from 1920 until 1927 but it soon became clear that a purpose-built, new steamer was required.

During 1924 the directors of the Steamship Company began considering the purchase of a larger ship and at an Extraordinary General Meeting of Shareholders on 16 June 1925, the directors were empowered to place the order with Ailsa Shipbuilding Company of Troon, Scotland. In order to keep their yard open during the economic slump, this work was undertaken at cost, the contract price was £24,500 (equivalent to £1,290,000 in 2025). The new ferry, built to carry 400 passengers and cargo, was launched on 17 November 1925 and named Scillonian by Mrs. A.A. Dorrien-Smith of Tresco Abbey. At 11 pm on 25 January 1926 she completed her maiden voyage from Troon and docked at St Mary's. She made her first time-tabled, commercial trip from on 2 February 1926 from St Mary's to Penzance. It took her three and a quarter hours. Scillonian was grounded in the St Marys, Annet area on 10 September 1951 but refloated the next day, and kept in service until 1956.

Following this ship Scillonian II entered into service in 1956, purpose built for the Steamship Company by John I Thornycroft & Company of Woolston, Southampton at a cost of £250,000, and was in service until 1977. A second ship operated for a while named Queen of the Isles. At approx 500 tons she was smaller than Scillonian II and was used to augment the larger ship at busy times. She was also used to run charter services to the Islands from other ports. On her sale she went to operate an inter-island service in the Pacific.

The present Scillonian III was also purpose built for the Steamship Company and entered into service in May 1977. Scillonian III is the third passenger ship of this name and currently in service for passengers and cargo 8 months of the year. Due to the number of tidal currents which meet off Lands End, and the need for a shallow draught to allow access to the Islands, the sea journey to Scilly can be rough. For this reason Scillonian III was fitted with a "Flume" antiroll stabilizer system.

On 1 September 2009, the Steamship Company took over the lease to operate and manage Penzance Dry Dock. Established in 1834, it is one of the UK's longest established dry docks and provides facilities for vessels requiring repair and conversion. It takes in 15 to 20 ships a year.

At the Annual General Meeting in September 2010, the following corporate figures were published: During the previous fiscal year, Steamship Company craft had carried 73,000 passengers to Scilly by air and sea. This accounted for 61.4% of the total passenger market on the route between Scilly and the mainland. Isles of Scilly Skybus had a market share to 50.2% of all passengers flying to St Mary's.

In May 2011, the Steamship Company acquired Nike Engineering of the Porthmellon Industrial Estate on St Mary's, which provides marine and mechanical engineering services to the Isles of Scilly. In February 2015, the Steamship Company acquired Island Carriers (also of the Porthmellon Industrial Estate) which provides haulage and courier services on the island.

=== Helicopter service ===
After British International Helicopters ceased its service from Penzance in 2012, the Isles of Scilly Steamship Company became the sole transport operator to the Isles of Scilly, until the launch of the new Penzance Helicopters service. In February 2017 a new Penzance Heliport was unanimously granted planning permission by the Cornwall Council to reinstate a helicopter service from Penzance to the Isles of Scilly. In May of the same year, the Isles of Scilly Steamship Company began proceedings for a Judicial Review of the planning decision. These Judicial Review proceedings began after an anonymous appeal to the Secretary of State to review the planning permission failed a month earlier. The actions of the Steamship Company were widely condemned by businesses, residents, and visitors to Penzance and the Isles of Scilly. The judicial review was opposed by a petition started by an Isles of Scilly resident, which accumulated over 10,000 signatures in just a few days. Penzance Heliport resubmitted an amended planning application in January 2018. The planning application was successful and the new heliport was built, with the new Penzance Helicopters service starting flights to St Mary's and Tresco in March 2020.

Following the objection to the Penzance Heliport plans, in February 2018 the Isles of Scilly Steamship Company announced its own helicopter service operating from Land's End, to begin in May 2018. This announcement met widespread condemnation from those aware of the Isles of Scilly Steamship Company's actions. On 21 May 2018, the steamship company inaugurated its new service from Land's End Airport to St Mary's with a 10-seater AgustaWestland AW169 helicopter. In October 2018 the company announced its Island Helicopters service would be taking a "winter break" but in February 2019 it was announced the service was being withdrawn completely.

=== Fleet replacement ===
In early 2007, press reports indicated that Cornwall County Council was expected to approved plans for the construction of a new roll-on/roll-off replacement ferry at a cost of £17.5 million. This vessel would be leased to the Isles of Scilly Steamship Company and would replace both Scillonian III and Gry Maritha. This plan (named in its late stages as Option A) was halted because of local opposition to both the built elements of the scheme and the vessel design. A pressure group called upon the then Transport undersecretary, Norman Baker to halt the scheme. In May 2016, the Steamship Company acquired the Mali Rose, a Norwegian freight ship that was expected to replace the smaller and older Gry Maritha in the autumn of that year. The vessel was found to be unsuitable and made her final voyage from St Mary's to Penzance on 9 May 2019. The Gry Maritha returned to regular service the following week.

A £42 million fleet development programme was revealed in April 2023, including the building of Scillonian IV and two new freight vessels, to be in service by March 2026. Following the development of a competing proposal from Belfast shipbuilder Harland & Wolff to run a service to the Scillies, the Steamship Company announced that its preferred contractor for the ferry and cargo ship was the Concarneau-based shipbuilder Piriou.

== Fleet ==
=== Currently in service ===
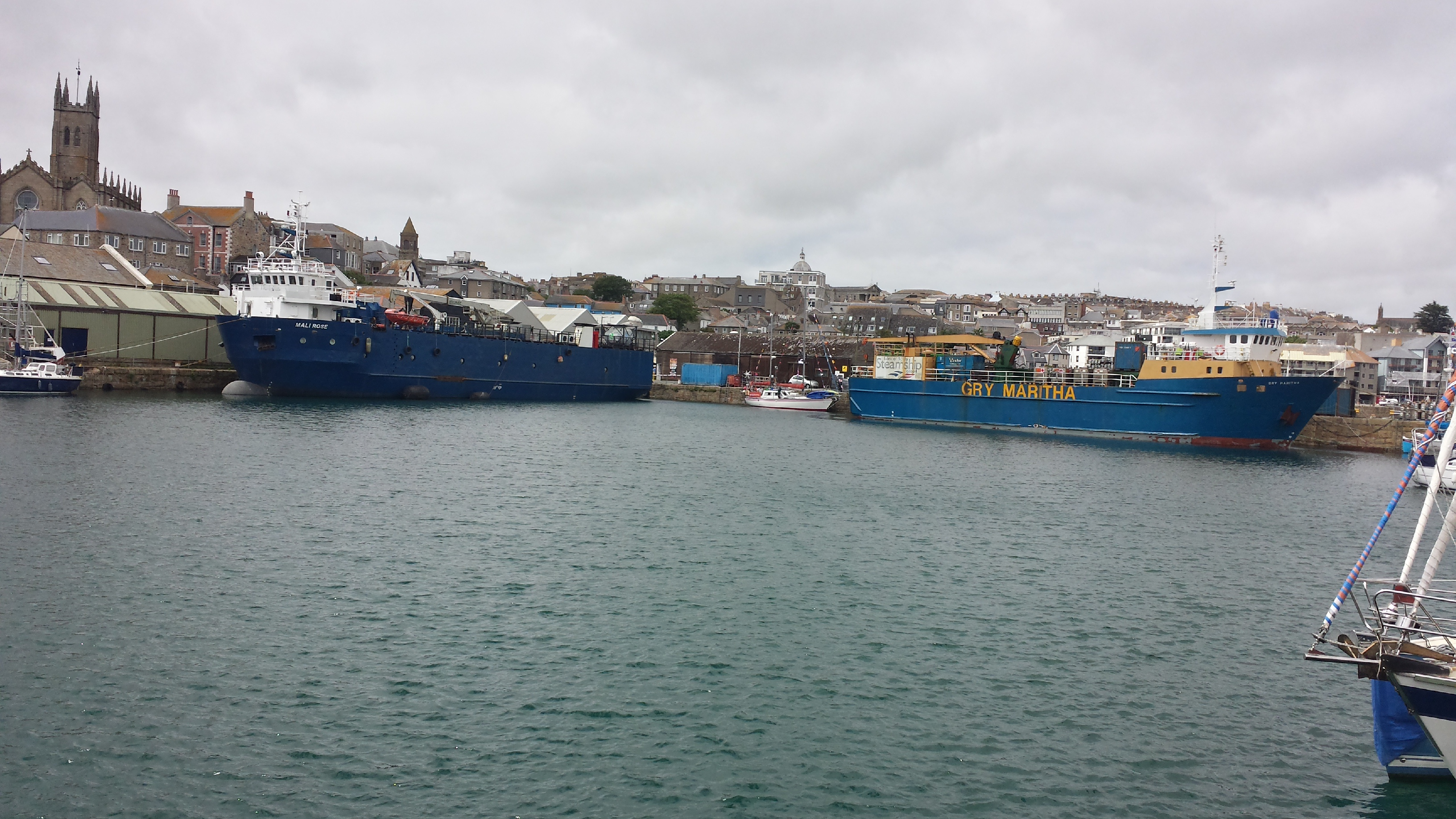
Gry Maritha in Penzance Harbour with her expected replacement, Mali Rose

- Gry Maritha — Cargo vessel built in Norway and acquired in 1989. Gry Maritha was the company's principal freight vessel from 1989 to 2016, then a reserve freight vessel from 2016 to 2019 (see entry below for Mali Rose), and then again the principal freight vessel from 2019 to 2026. In July 2026 the vessel again went into reserve.
- Menawethan — Cargo vessel, purpose built for the company, launched on 31 October 2025, and in service from July 2026. She sailed from the Piriou yard in Vietnam on 27 March 2026, prior to entering service later that year.
- Lyonesse Lady — Inter-island launch, purpose built in 1991 by Lochabar Marine to replace the MV Gugh (see below).
- Swift Lady — Inter-island RIB, purpose built in 2004 by Redbay Boats, Northern Ireland.

=== Future vessels ===
- Scillonian IV — a new purpose-built passenger and cargo vessel due to enter service in 2027.

=== Former ISSC vessels ===
- RMS Peninnis — operated by the ISSC 1920–1927.
- MV Ganilly — operated by the ISSC 1923–1932. Built in 1923 by H W Dockyard, Plymouth. In common with many of her sister ships, Ganilly at some time parted her moorings in heavy weather, and was driven ashore onto St Mary's. Sold to Coast Lines in 1932 and scrapped in 1937.
- SS Gugh — operated by the ISSC 1923–1951. A vessel of 47 ft. Built in 1910 by Philip and Sons of Dartmouth, formerly the steamer Dart. Converted to diesel in 1927 and received a major refit in 1947, which included the replacement of her open helm with a wheelhouse, and the addition of high timber gunwales. She broke her moorings in St Mary's harbour in a severe gale, and was wrecked on Porthmellon in 1951.
- SS Scillonian, operated by the ISSC 1926–1956.
- SS Advance
- SS Endeavour
- MV Endeavour

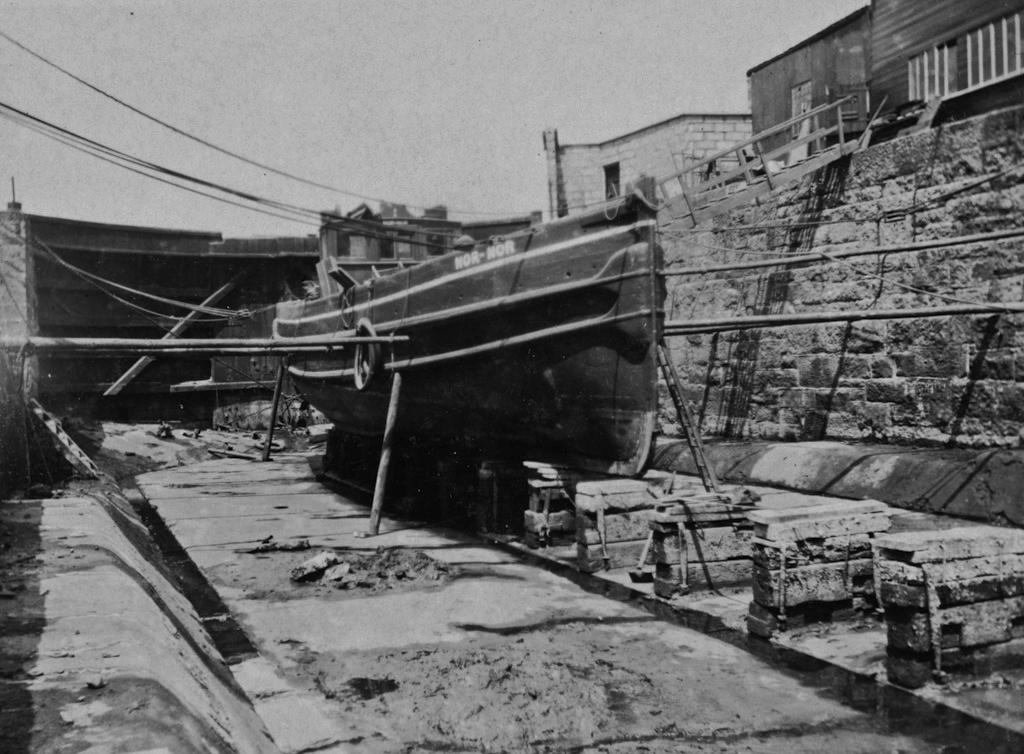
Nor Nor in Holman's dry dock, Penzance

- MV Nor Nor - operated by the ISSC 1931–1947. An ex Royal Navy harbour launch that remained on Scilly following World War I, she was purchased by the Duchy of Cornwall (she was known at this time as the Duchy trot boat) before being purchased by ISSC. She was powered by twin motors. At some point Nor Nor was refitted for ISSC and fitted with a larger wheelhouse, her forward cabin replaced by a cargo hold, and a taller funnel and timber gunwales were added.. Like her sister ship, SS Gugh, she broke her moorings in St Mary's harbour in a severe gale, and was wrecked on Porthmellon in 1947.
- TSMV Lady of the Isles — operated by the ISSC 1947–1952. Sold to a French owner.
- Gondolier — operated by the ISSC ??–1967.
- Lyonnesse — operated by the ISSC ??– 1967.

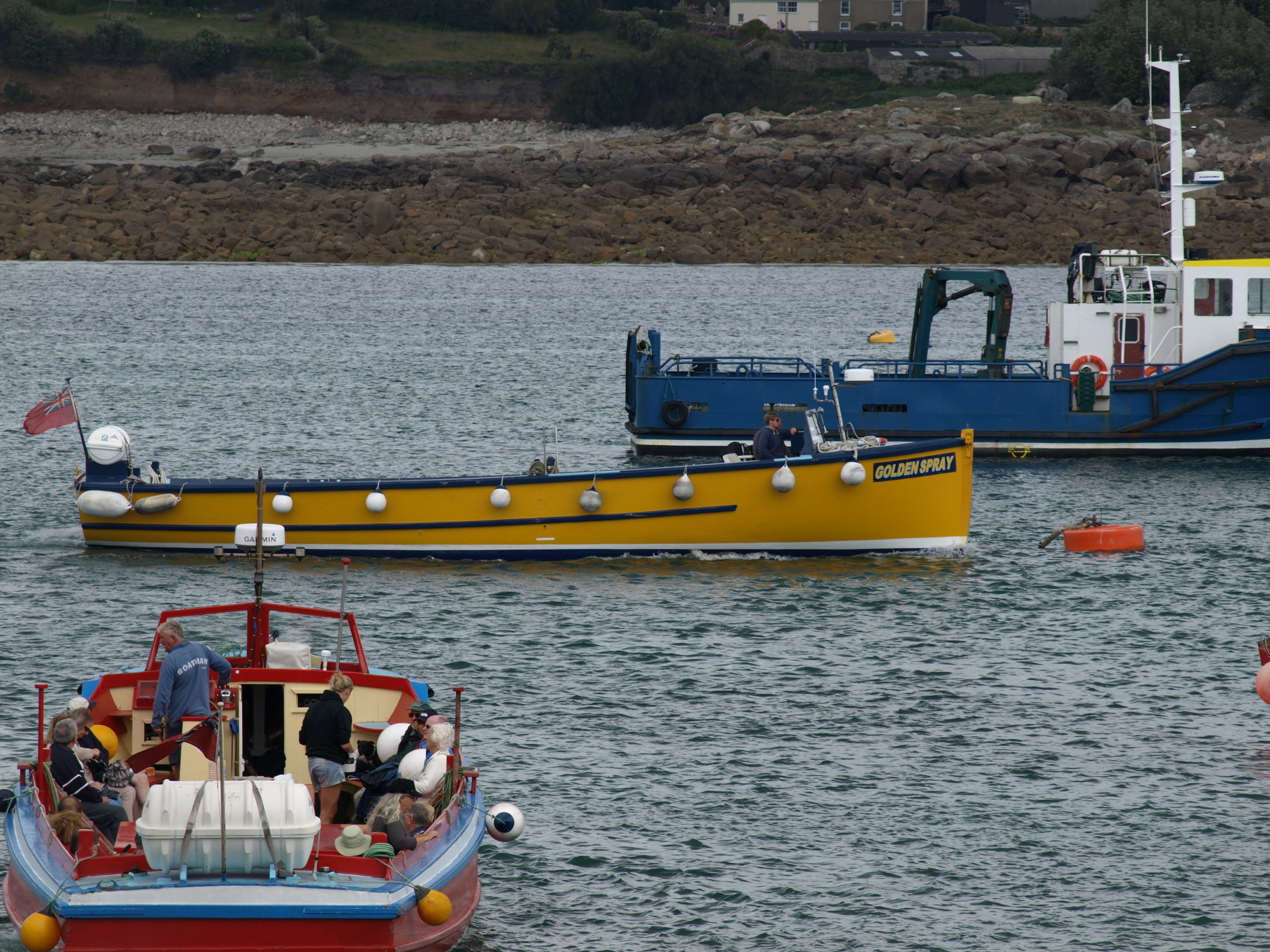
Golden Spray

- Golden Spray III — operated by the ISSC 1947–1968. Now operated by the St. Mary's Boatman's Association.
- MV Kittern — operated by the ISSC 1949–late 1960s. Built in 1904 as a Royal Navy 52½ ft steam harbour launch, she was steamed from London by Matt Lethbridge at the helm, accompanied by Billie Thomas, engineer in 1947. She underwent an extensive refit for ISSC by engineer Henry Thomas, and carpenters, Ellis and Phillips, which included the replacement of her steam plant with twin motors, the addition of a new larger wheelhouse, the replacement of her forward cabin with a cargo hold, new funnel and the addition of high timber gunwales. It is thought Kittern was accidentally crushed by a much larger vessel against a pier and sank, possibly at Penzance, in the late 1960s or early 1970s. Kittern can be viewed in her original Naval form in 1948: https://www.britishpathe.com/video/island-mail/query/scilly, and in her post-refit state, 1963 at 1.07 here: https://www.britishpathe.com/video/scilly-isles/query/scilly
- MV Tean — operated by the ISSC 1952–early 1990s. Built as a Royal Navy harbour launch number 183942, at Dickie's yard, Bangor in 1941. Length 53 feet (16 m). Gross tonnage 20.65. Registered tonnage 9.30. 12 ft beam. She was brought to Scilly in her original Naval state from Worcester, helmed by Clifford Jenkin, with motor engineer JT Lethbridge in attendance. Like MV Kittern, she underwent an extensive refit on Scilly, which included the replacement of her original power plant with a new L Gardner & Sons 6 cylinder 6LW diesel engine, larger wheelhouse, the replacement of her forward cabin with a cargo hold, new funnel and the addition of high timber bulwarks. She underwent another ISSC refit in 1983, which included the replacement of her timber gunwales with steel railings and a replacement 'modern' funnel. She has been in various private hands 1990s-2021. She was based in Bideford for a time in the early 2000s, and made local headlines when on passage from Bideford to Lydney, when she got into difficulties at Portishead, was refused entry into Portishead Marina, and had to be beached just outside the marina. Here she remained for several months whilst repairs were undertaken, and she eventually made it to Lydney. Her current (2021) location is Bullo Pill, off the Severn estuary.
- TSMV Scillonian II — operated by the ISSC 1956–1977.
- MV Gugh — operated by the ISSC 1961–1991. Built as a Royal Navy 53 ft harbour launch 13.1 beam, 11 Gross Register Tonnage, 105 bhp 6 cylinder Associated Equipment Company diesel. Built at Rowhedge Ironworks yard, Colchester in 1943, order no. 300564, yard no. 615. Initially posted to Scapa Flow as HL 306, she later transferred to Devonport and was renumbered as C674. Disposed of by the Admiralty in 1959, she was purchased by E. Geary, Rochester, who replaced her AEC diesel with a Gardner 6LW. In 1960 she was purchased by J.P. Knight Ltd, Rochester, who converted her for use as a salvage launch and renamed herFervent. She was sold to ISSC in 1961, where like her sister ships Tean and Kittern, although retaining her Gardner engine, she underwent extensive refitting, which included the fitting of a larger wheelhouse, the replacement of her forward cabin with a cargo hold, new funnel and the addition of high timber gunwales. She was sold into private ownership in 1991 and laid up in D Pitman's yard, Southampton. By 1995 she had been converted into a motor launch. She is currently (2022) berthed at Hull marina, where she appears to have been since around 2007, and most recently known as 'Freedom', having at some point been extensively remodelled as a parody 'pirate ship'. Gugh can be seen in her Issc form in the following 1965 British Pathe clip at 3.14. https://www.britishpathe.com/video/mr-wilson-in-scilly-isles/query/scilly Was replaced by the current Lyonesse Lady.
- TSMV Queen of the Isles – operated by the ISSC 1964–1966.

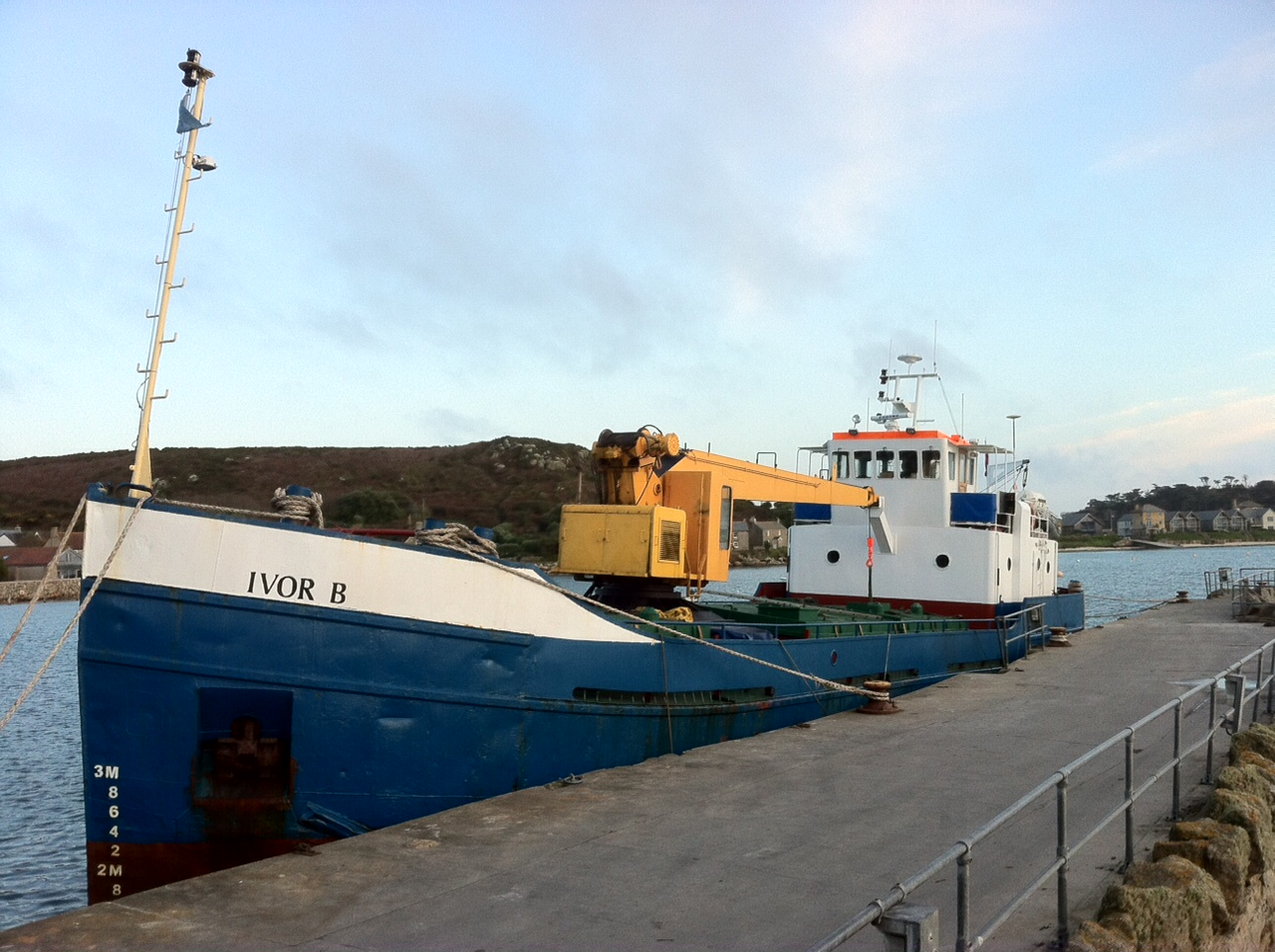
Ivor B (IMO 7006041) at New Grimsby Harbour, Tresco

- Ivor B — cargo vessel. Acquired by the ISSC in 2010, formerly Guedel and in French service, formerly serving islands off the coast of Brittany. Is 32 metres long and capable of carrying around 280 tonnes of cargo. Named after the late Ivor Bone, a building contractor manager during the construction of the new Five Islands School. Sold in 2012 and subsequently renamed Evora.
- Mali Rose — cargo vessel built in Norway in 1992 and sailed the fjords with fish meal as the main cargo. Acquired in 2016 by the steamship company to replace the Gry Maritha. A series of mishaps and conversions meant the vessel finally made her inaugural trial sailing on 17 July 2017 and provided a sporadic service before making her final voyage on 9 May 2019. Sold on 19 December 2019 to an unreported buyer from Norway for an undisclosed price. It is believed the ship has been renamed Skylus.
- Scillonian III — Passenger and cargo vessel purpose built in 1977 by Appledore Shipbuilders, Devon. Refitted in 2013 and withdrawn from service in November 2026.

== Services ==
Scillonian III operates a return service from March to November (Monday to Saturday, and some Sundays during July/August). She departs Penzance at 9.15am and returns from St. Mary's at 16.30pm, although these times may differ on certain dates due to tidal conditions, school holidays, and other events. The sailing time is approximately 2 hours 45 minutes.

During the winter, when Scillonian III is out of service, a cargo service is provided by the Gry Maritha.

In 2024 a rival planned to start a competing service operated by a fast ferry. But this never happened in the end.
