= Menawethan (ship) =

2025 cargo ship

History
- Namesake: Menawethan
- Operator: Isles of Scilly Steamship Company
- Builder: Piriou Shipyard, Vietnam
- Yard number: C.440
- Laid down: June 2024
- Launched: November 2025
- Completed: January 2026
- In service: July 2026
- Identification: IMO number: 1056367; MMSI number: 232059791
- Status: In Service

General characteristics
- Tonnage: 984 GT, 425 DWT
- Length: 45.0 metres
- Beam: 11.3 metres
- Draught: 3.1 metres
- Speed: 10 knots
- Capacity: 12 passengers

Menawethan is a cargo ship operated by the Isles of Scilly Steamship Company on its service from Penzance to Isles of Scilly.

== History ==
In September 2023 Menawethan was ordered by the Isles of Scilly Steamship Company from the Piriou shipyard at Ho Chi Minh City Vietnam, to replace the Gry Maritha. Construction commenced in June 2024, the vessel was floated out on 31 October 2025, and Sea trials commenced in January 2026.

Menawethan departed Ho Chi Minh City on its delivery voyage to Penzance on 27 March 2026, and arrived on 18 June. The official naming ceremony was held on 8 July, and she entered service five days later.
