= HMS Argus (1904) =

1905 Royal Navy coast guard cutter

History
- Name: 1904: Argus; 1917: Argon; 1920: Peninnis; 1927: Riduna
- Owner: 1905: Admiralty; 1920: WH Ward; 1920: Isles of Scilly SS Co; 1927: Alderney Steam Packet Co
- Operator: 1905: HM Coast Guard; 1917: (United Kingdom) Royal Navy; 1920: Isles of Scilly SS Co; 1927: Alderney Steam Packet Co
- Port of registry: 1920: (United Kingdom) Scilly; 1927: (United Kingdom) Guernsey
- Builder: Bow, McLachlan & Co, Paisley
- Yard number: 176
- Launched: 6 December 1904
- Completed: 1905
- In service: 1905
- Out of service: 1931
- Fate: Scrapped 1932

General characteristics
- Type: built 1904 as coastguard cutter and fishery protection ship; converted 1920 into passenger ferry
- Tonnage: 224 GRT, 88 NRT
- Length: 130.0 ft (39.6 m)
- Beam: 23.2 ft (7.1 m)
- Draught: 9 ft (2.7 m)
- Depth: 11.5 ft (3.5 m)
- Installed power: 65 NHP
- Propulsion: Triple expansion engine
- Speed: 11 1/2 knots (21.3 km/h)
- Armament: Two 6-pounder guns

HMS Argus was a steamship that was built in Scotland in 1904 as a cutter and fishery protection ship for the His Majesty's Coast Guard, and later served in the Royal Navy as HMS Argon. After the First World War she was converted into a passenger ferry, serving first the Isles of Scilly as Peninnis and then in the Channel Islands as Riduna. She was scrapped in England in 1932.

== Building ==
Bow, McLachlan and Company built Argus in Paisley, Renfrewshire, launching her on 6 December 1904 and completing her in 1905. Her length was 130.0 ft (39.6 m), her beam was 23.2 ft (7.1 m), her depth was 11.5 ft (3.5 m) and her tonnage was 224 GRT. She had a single screw, driven by a three-cylinder Triple expansion engine that was rated at 65 NHP and age her a speed of 11 1/2 knots (21.3 km/h).

== Government service ==
After completion in 1905, Argus was delivered to Sheerness to replace the sailing cruisers Adder and Victoria. She was armed with two 6-pounder guns.

In 1905, she captured seven Dutch coopers inside the three-mile limit off the Humber. She seized 2¼ tonnes of tobacco and cigars that were being sold illegally to local fishermen.

In July 1909 she was off Hastings, under the command of Captain Hicks RN, watching the interests of British fishermen and keeping a look out for French boats within the three mile radius.

In 1917 Argus was commissioned into the Royal Navy as HMS Argon.

== Passenger ferry ==
Argon was decommissioned from the Royal Navy, and in 1920 she was bought a William H Ward of Woodford, Essex. Ward sold her on to the Isles of Scilly Steamship Company for £8,000, (Note: Ships Monthly, Volume 10, 1975 gives a sale price of £10,000) refitted for £5,000 and renamed RMS Peninnis. She ran between Penzance and the Isles of Scilly until 1926, when the purpose-built Scillonian replaced her.

In 1927 the Alderney Steam Packet Company bought the ship and renamed her Riduna. In 1931, she was sold for scrap in Plymouth to William Hubert Davies, who broker her up in Plymouth in 1932.

== Bibliography ==
- Duckworth, Leslie Dyce; Langmuir, Graham Easton (1948). Railway and other steamers. Glasgow: Shipping Histories.
