= Scillonian (1925) =

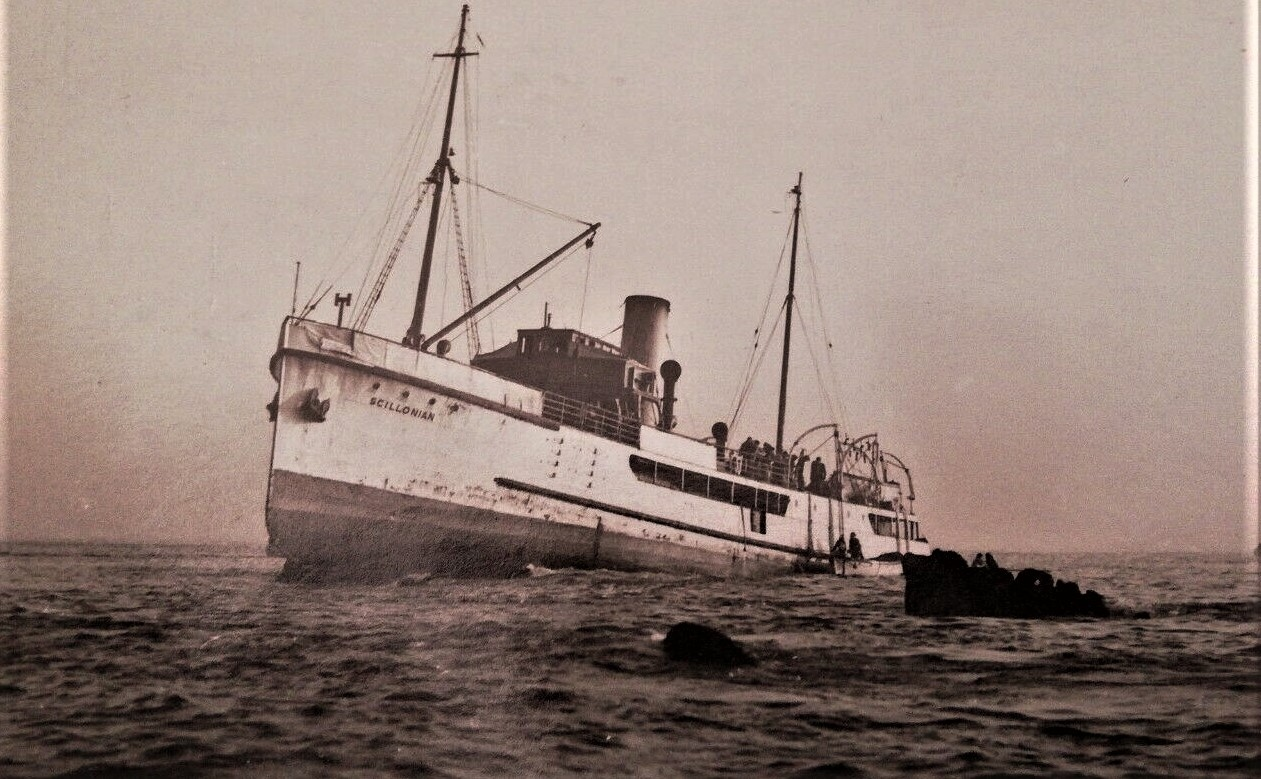
- Scillonian wreck

History
- Name: Scillonian
- Owner: Isles of Scilly Steamship Company
- Operator: Isles of Scilly Steamship Company
- Port of registry: United Kingdom
- Route: Penzance to the Isles of Scilly
- Builder: Ailsa Shipbuilding Company Ltd, Troon
- Cost: £24,500
- Yard number: 396
- Launched: 17 November 1925
- Maiden voyage: 25 January 1926
- Out of service: 1956
- Fate: Broken up in Ghent

General characteristics
- Tonnage: 429 gross register tons (GRT)
- Length: 170.7ft
- Beam: 28.7ft
- Draught: 10.5ft

RMV Scillonian was a passenger ferry built for the Isles of Scilly Steamship Company in 1925 by the Ailsa Shipbuilding Company Ltd of Troon, Scotland. She was designed to carry 400 passengers and cargo between Penzance, Cornwall, UK, to the offshore Isles of Scilly.

Formed on 26 March 1920, the Isles of Scilly Steamship Company initially operated services with the Peninnis (ex-HMS Argus), but it had soon become clear that a purpose-built, new steamer was required. During 1924 the directors of the Steamship Company began considering the purchase of a larger ship and at an Extraordinary General Meeting of Shareholders on 16 June 1925, the Directors were empowered to place the order with Ailsa Shipbuilding Company Ltd. In order to keep their yard open during the economic slump, this work was undertaken at cost, the contract price was £24,500 (equivalent to £1,290,000 as of 2025).

The new ferry was launched on 17 November 1925 and named Scillonian by Mrs. A. A. Dorrien-Smith of Tresco Abbey. The ship completed her maiden voyage from Troon at 11 pm on 25 January 1926 and docked at St Mary's. She made her first time-tabled, commercial trip on Thursday 2 February 1926 from St. Mary's to Penzance. It took her three and a quarter hours.

At 429 gross register tons she was considered, by some, as too big and unsuitable for local seas (the same happened when the second Scillonian went into service in 1956 and again with Scillonian III in 1977). However she proved to be a tremendous improvement and became popular over the years.

== War service ==
The Scillonian served the Isles of Scilly in almost continual service for over 29 years, including the war years of 1939-1945, with 40,000 troop movements being recorded. She operated mainly from Newlyn, when shipping troops, and carried degaussing gear as protection against magnetic mines. Her route out of Newlyn was to creep close to the shore, even between St Clement's Isle and Mousehole, to avoid setting off acoustic mines. On 12 August 1943 one of the St Mary's based Hurricane fighters a Mk IIb, no. Z3658 crashed into her masts, killing the pilot, WO1 Hunter.

== 1951 Shipwreck ==
In thick fog on 10 September 1951 the Scillonian was on her usual journey to St Mary's. Visibility that day was described by the lifeboat secretary, Trevellick Moyle as "I don’t think I have ever seen it thicker". The ship did not have radar and the captain, in poor visibility, often found his bearings by listening for the bell buoy of the Spanish Ledge, or the bugle of Vic Trenwith who would play on Peninnis Head. The captain heard neither and the Scillonian continued westward and hit the Great Wingletang Ledge on St Agnes. The fog lifted later that day to find the ship between two rocks and her bow in the air. Nine hours later, at 11 pm, she was refloated by the tide together with her own engines and a line from the lifeboat, and made her way to the harbour. The next day patched with cement and acetylene welding she was cleared by the Board of Trade as seaworthy to make the return journey to the mainland.
