= Scillonian (1955) =

History
- Name: Scillonian (1955–1977); Devonia (1977–1980); Devoniun (1980–1984); Syllingar (1984–1985); Remvi (1985–1989); Africa Queen (1989–1997); Princess Eliana (1997–1998); Olga J (1998–2004)
- Owner: Isles of Scilly Steamship Company; P & A Campbell; Torbay Seaways; Norse Atlantic Ferries; Hellenic Cruising Holidays; J.A.R. Atlantic Ocean Ltd; Asterias Maritime
- Port of registry: United Kingdom
- Route: Penzance to the Isles of Scilly
- Ordered: 18 March 1954
- Builder: John I. Thornycroft & Company, Woolston, Southampton
- Cost: £250,000
- Laid down: 25 March 1955
- Completed: 15 November 1955
- Maiden voyage: 23 March 1956
- In service: April 1956
- Out of service: 1998
- Identification: IMO number: 5315723
- Fate: Sank in 2004

General characteristics
- Tonnage: 921 gross register tons (GRT)
- Length: 208 ft (63.4 m)
- Beam: 30 ft (9.1 m)
- Draught: 14 ft (4.3 m)
- Propulsion: two 6-cylinder four-stroke diesel engines
- Speed: 15.15 kn (28.1 km/h)
- Capacity: 500 passengers
- Crew: 14

Scillonian (also referred to as Scillonian II or TSMV Scillonian) was a passenger ferry built for the Isles of Scilly Steamship Company in 1955 by John I. Thornycroft & Company of Woolston, Southampton. She was designed to carry 500 passengers and cargo between Penzance, Cornwall, to the offshore Isles of Scilly.

== Serving the Isles of Scilly ==
The ship was ordered on 18 March 1954 at a contract price of £250,000 (equivalent to £9,330,000 as of 2025), planned as a replacement for the first Scillonian which had been in continuous service since 1926. The new ship was laid down on 25 March 1955, completed on 15 November 1955 and christened by the Duchess of Gloucester. The second Scillonian was powered by two 6-cylinder four-stroke diesel engines (manufactured by Ruston & Hornsby) which propelled two three-blade screws, giving the ship a maximum speed of 15.5 knots.

The new passenger ferry made her first trip to the Isles of Scilly on 23 March 1956, sailing from Southampton to St Mary's. On her arrival, critics found the second Scillonian "too big, they will never hold her, not suitable or not as good a sea boat as the old boat" (the same had happened when the first Scillonian went into service in 1926 and would happen again with Scillonian III in 1977). Like her predecessor, the second Scillonian operated mainly between the Isles of Scilly and Penzance, although she sometimes diverted to Falmouth or St Ives in bad weather. A frequent traveller aboard the ship was Harold Wilson who had a holiday home in the Isles of Scilly. Between 1964 and 1966 she was joined on her route by the Queen of the Isles. Scillonian was eventually replaced by Scillonian III in May 1977, and was sold to P & A Campbell.

== Later history ==
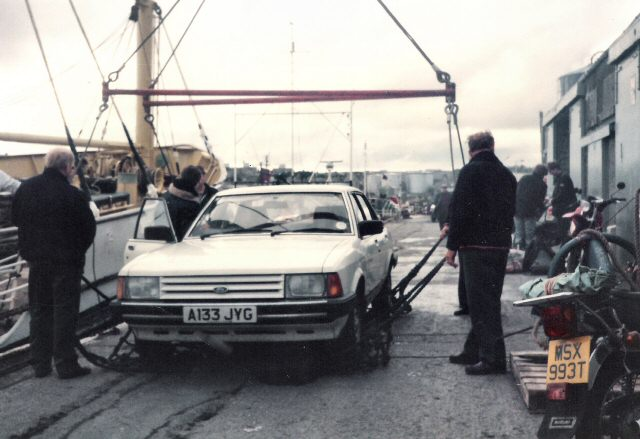
MV Syllingar in Kirkwall, 5 August 1985

P & A Campbell renamed her Devonia and she joined the Balmoral, offering coastal cruises around the South Coast. In her first season Devonia deputised for Balmoral on the Bristol Channel, and ran on the Thames. P&A Campbell hoped to use her freight capacity to serve Lundy, work eventually taken over by the Oldenburg. Over the winter of 1977/1978, Devonia was chartered for oil rig ferry work at Loch Kishorn, before returning to the Bristol Channel. P & A Campbell ceased operations in 1980, after which the ship was acquired by Torbay Seaways and renamed Devoniun in 1982. She operated trips to the Channel Islands and local excursions from Torquay. In 1984 she was sold to Norse Atlantic Ferries, and renamed Syllingar after arriving in the Orkney Islands in November 1984. She made up to two return trips each week between Kirkwall, Westray and Scalloway, plus additional cruises to Foula and Fair Isle. Financial problems forced the service to cease in August 1985. Following her period as Syllingar the ship was renamed Remvi in 1986, and ran across the Adriatic for Hellenic Cruising Holidays until 1989. As Africa Queen she was operated by J.A.R. Atlantic Ocean Ltd of Belize from 1989 to 1997 and sailed off West Africa. The latter company renamed her the Princess Eliana in 1997 before her final sale in 1998 as Olga J to the Cypriot Greek ship-owner, John Christodoulo, who was director of Asterias Maritime, a company registered in Belize. The ship and her crew were finally abandoned by her owner in Bourgas, Bulgaria and she later sank there in 2004.

== See also ==
- Scillonian (1925)
- Scillonian III
