= Harbour launch =

Small vessel used by Royal Navy

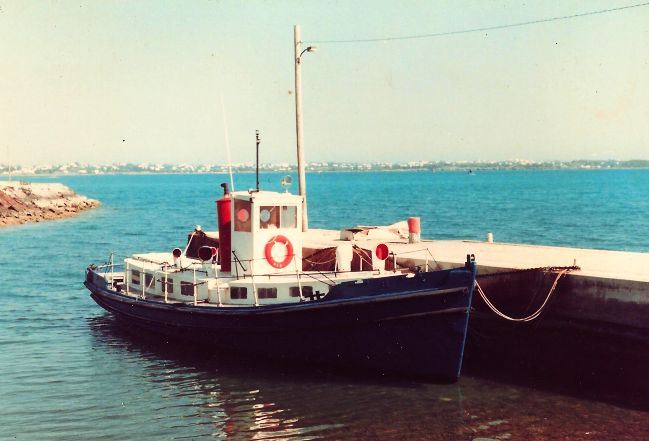
- A harbour launch (diesel) of HMS Malabar at the Royal Naval Dockyard, Bermuda c. 1988

Class overview
- Operators: Royal Navy
- Built: 1850s-1968
- In commission: 1850s-1990s

General characteristics HL(S) and HL(D)
- Type: Harbour launch
- Displacement: 24.6 t
- Length: 52ft 6in
- Beam: 12ft 6in - 13ft 6in
- Draught: 5ft 5in
- Propulsion: steam engine or diesel engine
- Speed: 9.5 kn (17.6 km/h)
- Range: 230 Miles

The harbour launch, commonly termed 52 1/2ft harbour launch (based on the waterline length) was a type of small launch used by the Royal Navy for general duties around Royal Naval dockyards and sea ports. They were of a double diagonal oak plank over lightweight teak frames hull construction (the diagonals of the inner and outer skins running in opposite directions & separated by a skin of oiled calico cloth), as were RNLI lifeboats of the era, making for an extremely light but strong construction.

The first were built in the 1850s with the advent of the steam engine and were originally designated harbour service launches. From the 1890s to the 1960s they were built to the same broadly common design, first with steam engines and later with diesel engines, by small yards contracted locally by dockyards and bases.

Design differences include earlier vessels being of 12'6" beam, with later vessels 13'6". The earliest vessels also had a fully round bilge, compared to later designs. Earlier vessels can be identified by their separate aft and boiler/engine room cabin superstructures, with later designs incorporating all compartment superstructures in one steel casing. Coxwains shelter positions varied considerably over time, with early vessels having them positioned directly in front of the forward cabin. On later models they were moved slightly aft, being positioned over the front section of the forward cabin, before finally settling down to a midships position, allowing good all round visibility.

Visually one of the most striking differences between pre- and postwar vessels is the prow angle, the rule of thumb being earlier steam vessels had straight prows, and the newer diesel vessels that superseded them being raked. This was the initial intention, but WW2 saw a shortage of diesel fuel and an abundance of coal, so many raked-stemmed hulls that were designed around diesels engines instead received steam plant, a practice that continued into the early fifties until diesel became widely available once again. Conversely, many early diesel boats have straight prows, either fitted from new, or retrofitted when the original steam plant was replaced.

In 1942, following the introduction of the Type Two 63 ft HSL by the Royal Air Force, Admiralty Fleet Order 1518 re-designated the harbour service launch as "Harbour Launch (Steam)" or "Harbour Launch (Diesel)", depending on the type of engine.
