= MDDS =

MDDS may refer to:

- MDDS (document), an official Indian document of common metadata standards regarding e-governance
- Mal de debarquement (MdDS), a rare neurological condition
- Mitochondrial DNA depletion syndrome, a group of autosomal recessive disorders

== See also ==
- MDD (disambiguation)
