= Air Charter Association of North America =

The Air Charter Association of North America (ACANA) is a nonprofit industry trade group and professional association representing North America’s air charter industry.

== History ==
Five leading air charter brokerage companies founded the Air Charter Association of North America in 2007. Its foundation was built on the premise of promoting best industry practices, ethics and transparency to air charter service providers in order to improve the air charter industry.

Since its inception, the nonprofit organization continues to lobby government officials to influence federal legislative moves, regulatory activities and legal actions on behalf of the air charter community. With combined revenues in the hundreds of millions annually, it has become a significant presence in the air charter market.

== Membership ==
To qualify for full membership of the association a prospective member must be an air charter service company established in North America. Part 121, 135 or foreign equivalent air carriers/operators are eligible for ACANA membership, with all of the rights and privileges conferred to them, with the exception of voting participation. Associate members must engage in the supply of aircraft to the air charter brokerage community on a continual basis, as determined by ACANA's board.

A prospective member company must maintain a dedicated office space in compliance with applicable zoning regulations, and have a minimum number of full-time employees as established by the board.

Prospective full member companies must have been in business continually for a minimum of three years. Companies with less tenure may be considered for associate membership, if the board of directors deems that they meet all other criteria. An existing full member must sponsor all prospective members.

ACANA sets criteria to be met by the member's management, as well. No member of management or trading staff of a prospective member's company can have been convicted, fined or sanctioned as a result of civil or criminal proceedings related to unlawful business practices. No member of management or trading staff of a prospective member's company can have been in violation of any applicable Department of Transportation (DOT) or Federal Aviation Administration (FAA) regulations governing the operation of charter flights.

Membership applications must be accompanied by either a published public statement of accounts (for publicly traded companies) or a letter from a certified public accountant, which states that the company is in good financial standing and that it has annual gross sales that meet or exceed the minimum level established by ACANA's board.

Prospective members must certify that they only transact business with Part 121 or Part 135 operators, or operators that have an international equivalent air carrier certificate for public transportation. Members must further certify that carriers utilized must be in good standing with the DOT and the FAA regarding all operational and safety standards.

=== Members ===
There are currently 22 members:

- Air Charter Safety Foundation
- Air Charter Service
- Air Charter Team
- Air Partner
- Air Planning LLC
- AON
- ARGUS International, Inc
- Avinode
- CharterSearch
- Desertjet
- East Coast Air Charter
- Freedom Air
- Le Bas International
- Majestic Jet
- Paramount Business Jets
- Premier Charter Network
- Priority Jet
- PrivateFly
- SC Aviation
- Stratos Jet Charter Services
- Ultimate Jetcharters

== Leadership ==
Co-Founder - Scott Bickford (Air Planning)
Chairman - Paul McCluskey (Hunt and Plamer USA)
President – Richard Zaher (Paramount Business Jets)
Vice President – Seth Rothman (Air Partner)
Treasurer — Sharon Thomas (Air Planning)
Secretary — Kassie Parker (Air Planning)

== Regulation of the air charter industry ==
As noted by the National Business Aviation Association (NBAA), while the FAA closely regulates Part 135 charter operators, air charter brokers are not comprehensively regulated. In the course of their business, brokers encounter a number of federal and state agencies that may have jurisdiction over their business.

Air charter brokers currently perform a valuable service for various agencies of the federal government. For example, air charter brokers arrange most of the nation's immigration and customs enforcement deportations and federal interstate prisoner movements. In general words, the role of air charter brokers is to arrange air transportation. They find a plane and resell its services or vice versa can be done, like first find a customer and then find a plane for the customer.

The assumed authority to impose regulatory powers on air charter brokers by the Department of Transportation (DOT) has recently been challenged, by CSI Aviation Services (CSI).

Since 2003, CSI has been under contract with the General Services Administration (GSA) to broker air charter service for various federal agencies. On March 10, 2009, CSI won a competitive bid to renew its status as a GSA contractor through 2014. A few days prior, on March 6, the DOT sent CSI a letter requesting information to determine whether the company was engaging in "indirect air transportation" without the certificate of authority required by the Federal Aviation Act. After the company provided the requested information, the DOT stated that they believed CSI was acting as an unauthorized indirect air carrier in violation of the Federal Aviation Act with respect to business transacted via its GSA schedule listing, and that the violations of the Federal Aviation Act constituted unfair and deceptive practices and unfair methods of competition in violation of 49 U.S.C. § 41712, issuing a cease-and-desist letter to CSI ordering CSI to terminate its business contractual relationships with various federal agencies.

The United States Court of Appeals for the District of Columbia Circuit subsequently issued an opinion in CSI Aviation Services, Inc. v. U.S. Department of Transportation April 1, 2011 which found that the DOT had overstepped its legal authority when attempting to block the federal contracts of CSI Aviation Services, stating in their opinion that “given DOT’s complete failure to explain its reading of the statute, we find it impossible to conclude that the agency’s cease-and-desist order was anything other than arbitrary and capricious, and hence unlawful.”

The CSI case was seen as significant on a number of levels. First, the case is the first successful challenge of the scope of DOT's consumer protection regulatory authority and it established the first precedent limiting DOT's broad interpretation of what constitutes "common carrier" in the context of the definition of "air transportation". Second, the case involved an inter-agency dispute involving the General Services Administration, which strongly disagreed with DOT's position on having the authority to regulate CSI's ability to enter into government contracts with various federal agencies. Finally, the case is significant because the court held that the DOT does not possess the authority to interfere with business relationships between the federal government and air charter brokers unless and until the DOT provides a reasonable explanation for its actions. The immediate impact of the legal decision is that CSI, along with other air charter brokers, will be able to continue to enter into contracts to arrange air transportation as a principal without the fear of a potential DOT enforcement action.

In regards to this decision, ACANA's policy of implementing transparent best practices and “self-policing” within the air charter industry are attempts to diminish the need for and/or the desire of the DOT to provide this regulatory oversight of the air charter industry. The intent is that the DOT will rely more heavily on industry trade groups such as ACANA and individual air charter broker members to maintain their own high business standards, providing education to consumers about air charter services.
