= Illusions of self-motion =

Misperception of one's location or movement

Diagram of possible illusions of self-motions (vections). Adapted from

Illusions of self-motion (or "vection") occur when one perceives bodily motion despite no movement taking place. One can experience illusory movements of the whole body or of individual body parts, such as arms or legs.

== Vestibular illusions ==
The vestibular system is one of the major sources of information about one's own motion. Disorders of the visual system can lead to dizziness, vertigo, and feelings of instability. Vertigo is not associated with illusory self-motion as it does not typically make one feel as though one is moving; however, in a subclass of vertigo known as subjective vertigo one does experience one's own motion. People experience themselves being pulled heavily in one direction. There are also specific self-motion illusions that can occur through abnormal stimulation of various parts of the vestibular system, often encountered in aviation. This includes an illusion of inversion, in which one feels like one is tumbling backwards. Through various stimuli, people can be made to feel as if they are moving when they are not, not moving when they are, tilted when they are not, or not tilted when they are.

== Visual illusions ==
When a large part of the visual field moves, viewers feel like they have moved and that the world is stationary. For example, when one is in a train at a station, and a nearby train moves, one can have the illusion that one's own train has moved in the opposite direction. Common sorts of vection include circular vection, where an observer is placed at the center of rotation of a large vertically-oriented rotating drum, usually painted with vertical stripes; linear vection, where an observer views a field that either approaches or recedes; and roll vection, where an observer views a patterned disk rotating around their line of sight. During circular vection, the observer feels like they are rotating and the drum is stationary. During linear vection, the observer feels like they have moved forwards or backwards and the stimulus has stayed stationary. During roll vection, the observer feels like they have rotated around the line of sight and the disk has stayed stationary.

Inducing vection can also induce motion sickness in susceptible individuals. Susceptibility changes over the lifetime: young children and older adults seem to be more susceptible (at least to a circular vection stimulus) than adolescents and young adults. Furthermore, females seem to be slightly more susceptible to circular vection stimuli than males.

== Auditory illusions ==
Compared to visually-induced vection, auditorily-induced vection is generally weaker. Auditory-induced vection can only be elicited in about 25% to 75% of the participants under laboratory conditions, and only when participants are blindfolded. Most of the research has focused on eliciting circular vection horizontally about the body. Researchers have induced circular vection by mechanically rotating a buzzer around a subject in the dark or by presenting sound sequentially in one of several speakers arranged in a circular array. Adding auditory stimuli can significantly enhance visual, vestibular, and biomechanical vections.

== Biomechanical illusions ==
=== Sea legs, dock rock, or stillness illness ===
After being on a small boat for a few hours and then going back onto land, it may feel like there is still rising and falling, as if one is still on the boat. It can also occur on other situations, such as after a long journey by train or by aircraft, or after working up a swaying tree. It is not clear whether sea legs are a form of aftereffect to the predominant frequency of the stimulation (e.g., the waves or the rocking of the train), whether it is a form of learning to adjust one's gait and posture. The "sea legs" condition needs to be distinguished from mal de debarquement, which is much more long-lasting.

=== Treadmills ===
Subjects report a strong sense of self-rotation from stepping along a circular treadmill in the dark, which can be further enhanced through auditory cues.

After spending more than 10 minutes on a linear treadmill, it is common to experience the visual illusion of moving at a substantially accelerated pace for 2–3 minutes once back on solid ground.

== See also ==
- Balance disorder
- Broken escalator phenomenon
- Chronic subjective dizziness
- Ideomotor phenomenon
- Proprioception
- Seasickness
- Sense of balance, also known as equilibrioception
- Sensory illusions in aviation
- Spatial disorientation
- Tetris effect
