= PPPD =

PPPD may refer to:

- Point-to-Point Protocol daemon
- Pylorus-preserving pancreaticoduodenectomy, an operation for pancreatic cancer
- Persistent postural-perceptual dizziness
