= Campbeltown Airport =

Campbeltown Airport Port-adhair Cheann Loch Chille Chiarain

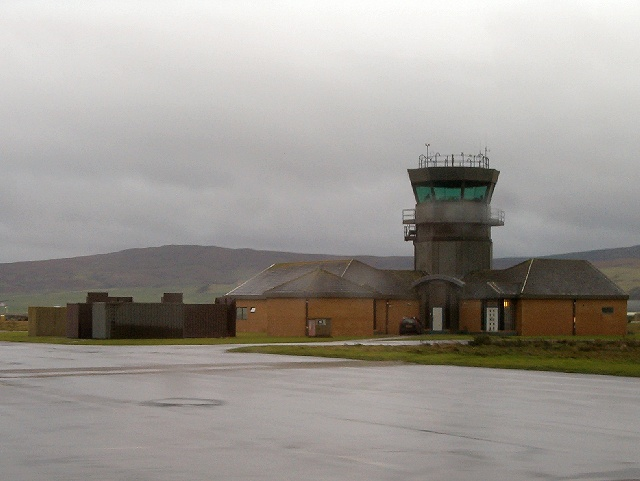
- IATA: CAL; ICAO: EGEC

Summary
- Airport type: Public
- Owner: Machrihanish Airbase Community Company (MACC)
- Operator: HIAL (public airport); MACC Developments (former airbase)
- Serves: Campbeltown
- Location: Machrihanish, Argyll and Bute, Scotland
- Elevation AMSL: 42 ft (13 m)
- Coordinates: 55°26′15″N 005°41′17″W
- Website: Campbeltown Airport

Map
- Location in Argyll and Bute

Runways
| Direction | Length | | Surface |
| Direction | m | ft | Surface |
|---|---|---|---|
| 11/29 | 1,412 | 4,633 | Grooved asphalt |

Statistics (2025)
- Passengers: 7,307
- Passenger change 2024-25: ▲4%
- Aircraft movements: 1,049
- Movements change 2024-25: Steady
- Sources: UK AIP at NATS; Statistics: UK Civil Aviation Authority

Campbeltown Airport (Scottish Gaelic: Port-adhair Cheann Loch Chille Chiarain) (IATA: CAL, ICAO: EGEC) is located at Machrihanish, 3 miles (6 km) west of Campbeltown, near the tip of the Kintyre peninsula in Argyll and Bute on the west coast of Scotland.

The airport was initially used by the Royal Navy and known as RNAS Machrihanish, transferred to the Royal Air Force and formerly known as RAF Machrihanish (after the village of Machrihanish) and hosted squadrons of the Royal Air Force and other NATO air forces as well as the United States Marine Corps. The airport is at a strategic point near the Irish Sea, and was used to guard the entrance to the Firth of Clyde where US nuclear submarines were based at Holy Loch and where Royal Navy Trident missile submarines are still based at HMNB Clyde (Faslane Naval Base).

The United States Navy handed the airfield back to the MoD on 30 June 1995, marking the end of its service as a NATO facility since 1960. The airbase was sold to Machrihanish Airbase Community Company (MACC) in May 2012, and two thirds of the runway is leased to Highlands and Islands Airports for Campbeltown Airport.

At 3,049 m (10,003 ft), the original runway 11/29 at Campbeltown Airport is the longest of any public airport in Scotland. It was built from 1960 to 1962 as part of a major reconstruction for the airport's role in NATO.

Campbeltown Aerodrome has a CAA Ordinary Licence (Number P808) that allows flights for the public transport of passengers or for flying instruction as authorised by the licensee (Highlands & Islands Airports Limited)

Since 2017, passengers departing from Campbeltown, as well as Barra and Tiree, have not been subject to security checks, instead declaring that they do not have any prohibited items. Upon arrival at Glasgow, passengers connecting to other flights must go through security there.

== Airlines and destinations ==
The following airlines operate regular scheduled flights to and from Campbeltown:

| Airlines | Destinations |
|---|---|
| Loganair | Glasgow |

== Incidents and accidents ==
- On 15 March 2005, a Loganair aircraft crashed into the sea 7.7 nautical miles (14.3 km; 8.9 mi) from the Campbeltown Airport, while operating as an air ambulance, killing both occupants, the pilot and the paramedic. The aircraft, a Britten-Norman Islander, was flying an instrument approach into Campbeltown in low clouds. The air ambulance had been sent to Campbeltown to transport a patient to Glasgow for surgery.
