= Barra Airport =

Airport located on the island of Barra in the Outer Hebrides, Scotland

Barra Airport Port-adhair Bharraigh

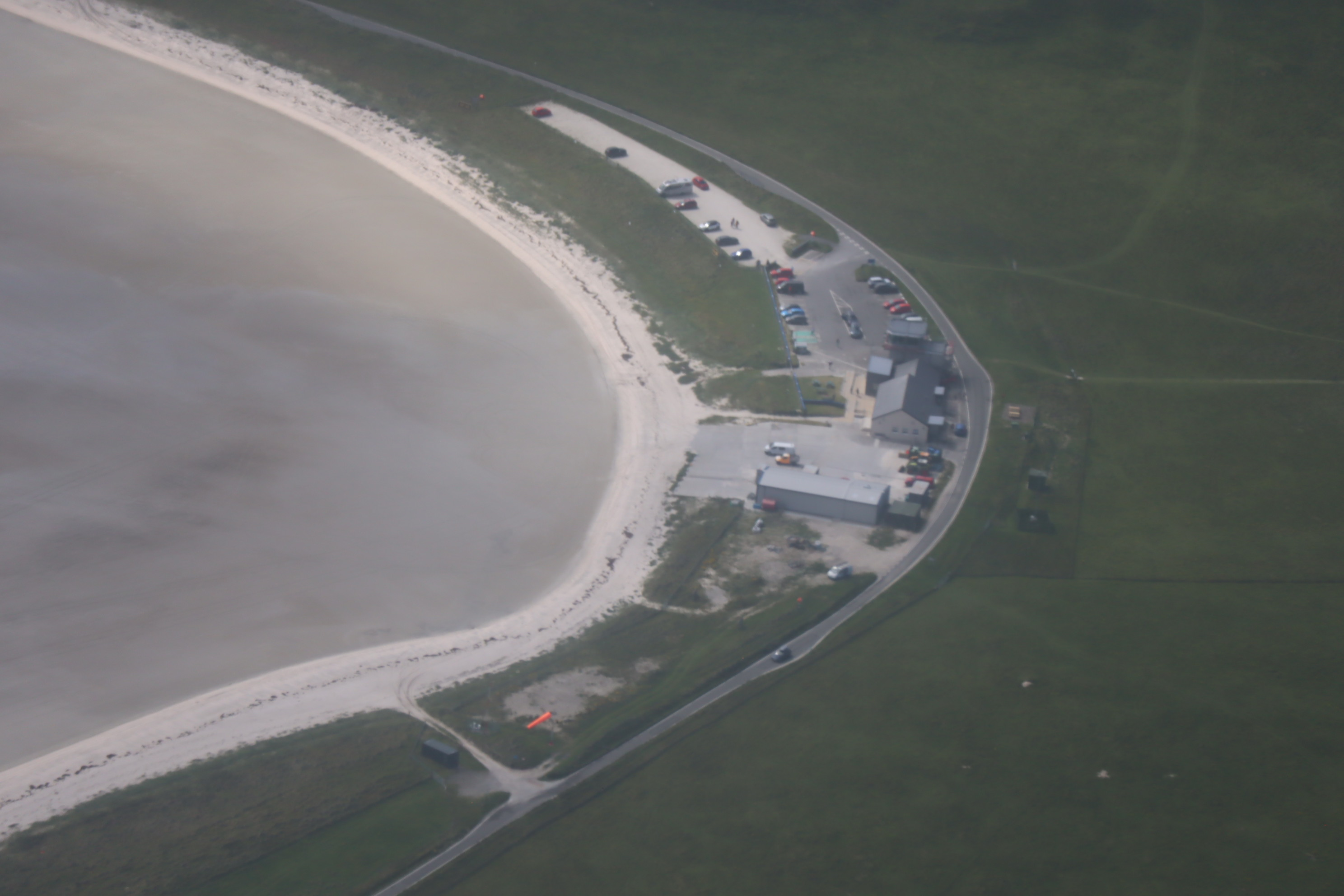
- IATA: BRR; ICAO: EGPR

Summary
- Airport type: Public
- Owner/Operator: HIAL
- Location: Barra, Scotland, UK
- Elevation AMSL: 1–4 ft (0.30–1.22 m)
- Coordinates: 57°01′22″N 07°26′35″W
- Website: Barra Airport

Map
- Location of airport on Barra Location of airport in Scotland

Runways
Direction	Length		Surface
Direction	m	ft	Surface
07/25	799	2,621	Sand
11/29	680	2,231	Sand
15/33	846	2,776	Sand

Statistics (2025)
- Passengers: 11,822
- Passenger change 2024-25: ▲7%
- Aircraft movements: 1,345
- Movements change 2024-25: ▼2%
- Sources: UK AIP at NATS; Statistics: UK Civil Aviation Authority

Barra Airport (Scottish Gaelic: Port-adhair Bharraigh) (IATA: BRR, ICAO: EGPR) (also known as Barra Eoligarry Airport) is a short-runway airport (or STOLport) situated in the wide shallow bay of Traigh Mhòr at the northern tip of the island of Barra in the Outer Hebrides, Scotland. The airport is unique, believed to be the only one in the world where scheduled flights use a tidal beach as the runway. The airport is operated by Highlands and Islands Airports Limited, which owns most of the regional airports in mainland Scotland and the outlying islands. Barra Airport opened in 1936 and the first airliner to use it was a de Havilland Dragon. The airport's only destination is Glasgow.

== Infrastructure ==
The beach is set out with three runways in a triangle, marked by permanent wooden poles at their ends, in directions 07/25, 11/29, 15/33. This means that almost always the DHC-6 Twin Otter aircraft that serve the airport can land into the wind. At high tide, these runways are under the sea; flight times vary with the tide. Emergency flights occasionally operate at night from the airport, with vehicle lights used to illuminate the runway and reflective strips laid along the beach.

Barra Airport also has a Civil Aviation Authority Ordinary Licence (Number P792) that allows flights for the public transport of passengers or for flying instruction as authorised by the licensee (Highlands & Islands Airports Limited). The aerodrome is not licensed for night use.

Since 2017, passengers departing from Barra, as well as Campbeltown and Tiree, have not been subject to security checks, instead declaring that they do not have any prohibited items. Upon arrival at Glasgow, passengers connecting to other flights must go through security there.

In 2024, the HIAL invested £1.5 million for Barra Airport refurbishment, which included the installation of external wall insulation, paving, decking, and modernising the café and lobby.

== Airlines and destinations ==
The following airlines operate regular scheduled and charter flights at Barra Airport:

Airlines	Destinations
Loganair	Glasgow

== Trivia ==
- In 2011, Barra Airport was voted No.1 in the world's top airport approaches by a poll conducted by PrivateFly.com, up from 10th place in 2010.
