= RAF Machrihanish =

Former RAF station in Argyll and Bute, Scotland

RAF Machrihanish
- Near Campbeltown, Kintyre, Argyll and Bute in Scotland
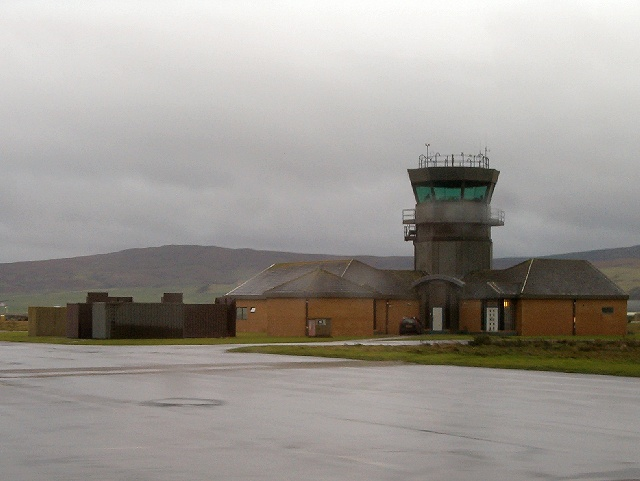
- The control tower at former RAF Machrihanish in 2006

- Airm a dhìonadh na fairgeachan (Scottish Gaelic for 'Arms to defend the seas')

Site information
- Type: Royal Air Force flying station
- Owner: Ministry of Defence (MOD)
- Operator: Royal Naval Air Service and RAF (1918); Fleet Air Arm (1941–1963); RAF (1963–1995); MOD (1995–2012)
- Condition: Closed

Location
- Location within Argyll and Bute RAF Machrihanish (the United Kingdom)
- Coordinates: 55°26′15″N 005°41′17″W
- Area: 415 hectares

Site history
- Built: 1918
- In use: 1918–1996
- Fate: Since 1996, part of the site has operated as Campbeltown Airport; Remainder of site sold in 2012 to the Machrihanish Airbase Community Company

Airfield information
- Identifiers: IATA: CAL, ICAO: EGQJ, WMO: 03111
- Elevation: 12.8 metres (42 ft) AMSL
Runways
Direction	Length and surface
11/29	3,048.9 metres (10,003 ft)

Royal Air Force Machrihanish or RAF Machrihanish (formerly ICAO: EGQJ) is a former Royal Air Force station located near the town of Machrihanish and 3.5 miles (5.6 km) west of Campbeltown, at the tip of the Kintyre peninsula, Argyll and Bute, in Scotland.

Two airfields known as Machrihanish have existed, the first was operational during the First World War and was used by the Royal Naval Air Service and RAF, before closing at the end of the Second World War. A second airfield, which was constructed during the Second World War, was used extensively by the Fleet Air Arm during the war. During the 1960s, it was redeveloped and became an RAF station and was made available to the US Navy as a nuclear weapons store and base for components of the US Navy SEALs Naval Special Warfare Group 2.

The draw-down of US military forces in Europe after the end of the Cold War resulted in the US Navy leaving Machrihanish and returning their facilities to the Ministry of Defence (MOD) on 30 June 1995, after which the station became MOD Machrihanish and was retained on a care and maintenance basis.

In May 2012, the station was sold to the Machrihanish Airbase Community Company (MACC) under community right-to-buy legislation. MACC now operates the site as a business park, with part of the airfield incorporating Campbeltown Airport.

== History ==
=== First World War ===
An airfield was first established at Machrihanish towards the end of the First World War, 2 miles (3.2 km) west of Campbeltown. The site, known as Machrihanish Aerodrome and Mooring Out Station, extended to 65 acres (26 hectares) and comprised timber and canvas Bessonneau hangars and Armstrong huts. It was operated by the Royal Naval Air Service (RNAS) as a secondary station of the Luce Bay Airship Station, located near Stranraer, approximately 50 miles (80 km) to the south-east. Due to Machrihanish being relatively open and without the benefit of shelter from woodland, it is thought that the airfield saw little use by airships. On 1 April 1918, Machrihanish came under the control of the newly formed Royal Air Force (RAF), when the RNAS was merged with the army's Royal Flying Corps. The airfield became part of No. 25 (Operations) Group, with No. 272 Squadron forming on 25 July 1918, operating eighteen Airco DH.6s on anti-submarine patrols in the Firth of Clyde.

Along with its parent station at Luce Bay, Machrihanish closed towards the end of 1918, with the airfield transferring to civil aviation use. In the 1930s, it was used for scheduled flights to Islay, Renfrew and Belfast by Midland & Scottish Air Ferries.

=== Second World War ===
The airfield was requisitioned by the Fleet Air Arm (FAA) in 1940 and in April 1941 it became known as Royal Naval Air Station (RNAS) Machrihanish or HMS Landrail. During the same period, a new airfield was constructed by Bernard Sunley & Sons for the FAA to the north west of the existing airfield. The new airfield was opened on 15 June 1941 and was known as RNAS Strabane until the summer of 1941, when it took on the names RNAS Machrihanish and HMS Landrail. The original airfield became a satellite station of the new airfield and became known as HMS Landrail II.

Throughout the Second World War, Machrihanish was heavily used for training by a wide range of FAA and RAF aircraft and as a base for squadrons disembarked from aircraft carriers. The airfield was also used for operational anti-submarine patrols and convoy escort duties, becoming one of the top three busiest stations in the UK. At the end of the war activity decreased, with the station closing on 16 April 1946. At the same time, HMS Landrail II closed, with the land returned to agricultural use.

=== Cold War ===
After closure, Machrihanish was retained by the FAA on a care and maintenance basis, until 1 December 1951 when it was reopened as a satellite of HMS Sanderling (now Glasgow Airport). It was used for a short period for training FAA pilots in preparation for their involvement in the Korean War aboard the aircraft carrier HMS Indomitable, before again being reduced to care and maintenance status on 30 September 1952. The airfield was used by the Fleet Requirements Unit in 1958.

==== Redevelopment for US and NATO use ====
In April 1959, it was announced that the airfield would be upgraded in order to support United States and NATO operations in the Clyde area and wider Atlantic. Paid for by NATO, the station underwent extensive redevelopment in the early 1960s, with land belonging to seven farms and six small holdings being acquired for the purpose. Its four existing runways were replaced by a new 3,049 m (10,003 ft) runway to allow Avro Vulcan bombers and other large aircraft to use the airfield.

Control of Machrihanish was transferred from the Admiralty to the Air Ministry on 27 May 1963. In June 1964, Machrihanish was opened as an RAF station under No. 18 Group, part of RAF Coastal Command. Although not an operational station and with no flying squadrons based there, it was assigned to NATO's Supreme Allied Commander Europe, for use as a forward operating base in the event of war with the Soviet Union.

==== US Navy use ====
The mid-1960s saw the airfield being made available for use to the US Navy. Although nominally still an RAF station, it came under the command of the US Navy's Commander in Chief, Atlantic Command. The first U.S. naval personnel arrived in mid-1967 and were from the Mobile Mine Assembly Unit, previously based at RAF Mildenhall in Suffolk. They were later joined by an Explosives Ordnance Disposal (EOD) Group detachment, part of the US Atlantic Fleet. On 7 March 1968, the Naval Aviation Weapons Facility Machrihanish (NAWF) was opened, its role being to 'receive, store, maintain, issue and tranship classified weapons in support of the US Navy and NATO operations'. The NAWF comprised a fenced compound located on the north-west side of the airfield, within which were three rows of flat roofed concrete sheds (known as igloos) about 161m long. The rows were sub-divided into compartments featuring air-tight doors and were designed for the storage of nuclear depth charges and atomic demolition munitions, for use in anti-submarine warfare.

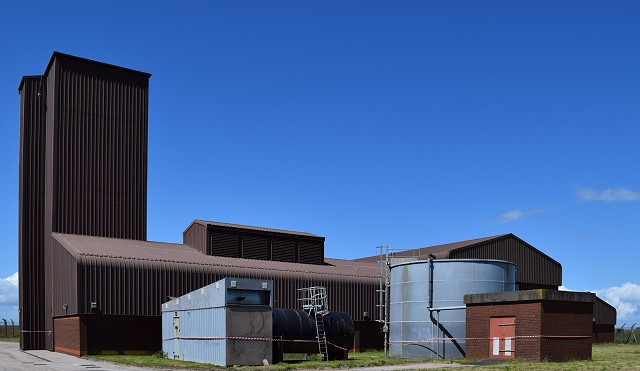
The US Navy SEALS building located on the south west side of the airfield.

A detachment of the US Marine Corps arrived in 1974, with the role of providing nuclear weapons security, which until then had been provided by USN personnel.

The early 1980s saw the arrival of Naval Special Warfare Unit 2 and Naval Special Warfare Task Group Europe, both components of the US Navy SEALs Naval Special Warfare Group 2. New buildings for the SEAL's use were constructed in the south-west part of the airfield. The main building featured offices, debriefing areas, armoury, sound proof room, internal 25m firing range and garage. A separate building contained a parachute drying tower and a large hall which allowed large vehicles to access the building directly from transport aircraft. A Gaydon type hangar was also constructed.

From 1981, RAF Machrihanish was certified as a potential emergency landing site for the Space Shuttle, to be used in the case of a transoceanic abort.

Between 1990 and 1995, £16 million and £39.9 million was spent on building works at the station by the Ministry of Defence and NATO respectively.

=== Military draw-down ===
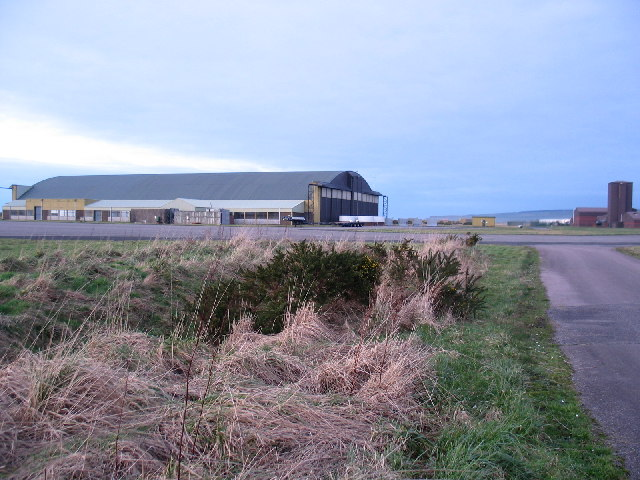
The Gaydon hangar at Machrihanish during 2006

The draw-down of US military forces in Europe after the end of the Cold War resulted in the US Navy leaving Machrihanish and returning their facilities to the Ministry of Defence on 30 June 1995.

After the departure of the US Navy, the station became known as Ministry of Defence (MOD) Machrihanish and was placed under a care and maintenance regime, meaning that although no longer in active use, it would be kept in a condition whereby it could be reactivated within a reasonable time-scale. The airfield continued to be used for occasional military ground and air exercises.

In March 1996, the Civil Aviation Authority granted Highlands and Islands Airports Ltd. (HIAL) an aerodrome licence which allowed commercial flights to operate from the airfield. In this capacity it became known as Campbeltown Airport.

In 2005, the MOD were still reported to be considering reactivating the airfield.

== Closure and post-military use ==
With no apparent military future for the station, the Machrihanish Airbase Community Company (MACC) was established in March 2008 by members of the local community who wished to see the site used for the benefit of those living and working in the area.

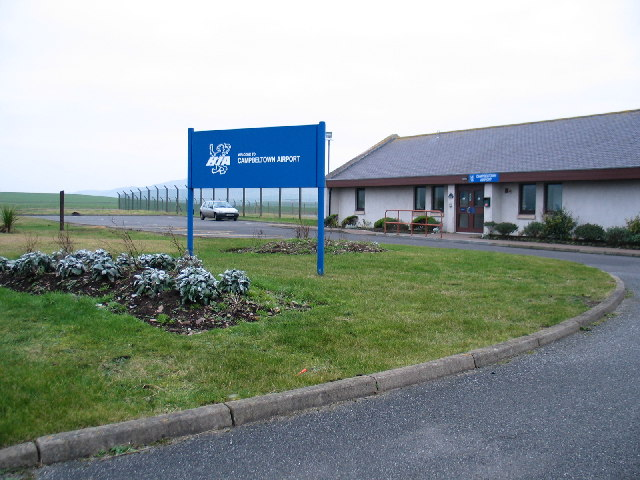
Campbeltown Airport Terminal during 2006.

On 6 October 2008, it was finally announced that Machrihanish was surplus to defence requirements and would be disposed of. On 14 May 2009, the site was advertised for sale with the MOD looking for expressions of interest to identify potential private sector investors. The move was criticised, with members of the local community expressing concern that they had not been consulted and that the potential for a community buy-out of the site was being ignored.

Plans for the buy-out, to be undertaken through community right-to-buy legislation, were hindered in August 2010 when the results of a local community ballot on the plans was rejected by the Scottish Government, due to concerns over the viability of the proposals. However, following a further ballot, MACC successfully purchased the site from the MOD for £1 on 11 May 2012. Supported by Highlands & Island Enterprise, the Scottish Government and Argyll & Bute Council, MACC have made available parts of the site for commercial use with the aim of creating a sustainable future for the Campbeltown area.

Campbeltown Airport, which has a long lease of their part of the site, continues to be operated by HIAL. Scheduled flights are operated to Glasgow Airport by Loganair.

== Heritage ==
Machrihanish's station badge, awarded in 1975, features a silver Scottish sword known as a claymore, with the blade displayed against the backdrop of four waves representing the sea. The badge portrays the station's use as forward operating base for maritime-related operations. The station's motto (Airm a dhìonadh na fairgeachan) is in Scottish Gaelic and translates as 'Arms to defend the sea', again acknowledging the station's maritime role.

== Conspiracy theories ==
During the 1990s, rumours that Machrihanish was being used by the US military to operate the alleged experimental Aurora reconnaissance aircraft appeared in the media. The rumours led to a parliamentary question by Llew Smith MP, where in response the Minister of State for the Armed Forces, Nicholas Soames MP, denied that any prototype aircraft belonging to the US was operating from Machrihanish:

Mr Llew Smith: To ask the Secretary of State for Defence how many Aurora prototype aircraft of the United States Air Force are based at the Machrihanish air force base in Argyll; and for what period permission has been given for basing these aircraft in the United Kingdom.
Mr Soames: There are no United States Air Force prototype aircraft based at RAF Machrihanish and no authorisation has been given by Her Majesty's Government to the United States Air Force, or any other US body, to operate such aircraft within or from the United Kingdom.

— Hansard (House of Commons – Written Answers to Questions), Thursday 26 January 1995

== See also ==
- List of former Royal Air Force stations
