= Mal de debarquement =

Mal de debarquement syndrome
- Other names: Disembarkment syndrome, illness of disembarkment

Mal de débarquement syndrome (MdDS; French: syndrome du mal de débarquement, lit. 'disembarkment illness syndrome'), also known as disembarkment syndrome, is a neurological condition usually occurring after a cruise, aircraft flight, or other sustained motion event. The French phrase mal de débarquement translates to "illness of disembarkment".

MdDS is typically diagnosed by a neurologist or an ear nose and throat specialist when a person reports a persistent rocking, swaying, or bobbing feeling (though they are not necessarily rocking). This usually follows a cruise or other motion experience. Since most vestibular testing proves to be negative, doctors may not see clear signs as they attempt to diagnose the syndrome. A major diagnostic indicator is that most patients feel better while driving or riding in a car, i.e., while in passive motion.

MdDS is unexplained by structural brain or inner ear pathology and most often corresponds with a motion trigger, although it can occur spontaneously. This differs from the very common condition of "land sickness" that most people feel for a short time after a motion event such as a boat cruise, aircraft ride, or even a treadmill routine which may only last minutes to a few hours.

Since 2020, the syndrome has received increased attention due to the number of people presenting with the condition, and more scientific research has commenced in determining what triggers MdDS and how to cure it. This is also due to the fact that MdDs is now officially recognized (2020).

== Symptoms ==
Common symptoms most frequently reported include a persistent sensation of motion usually described as rocking, swaying, or bobbing, disequilibrium with difficulty maintaining balance; it is never accompanied by a spinning vertigo. Chronically fatigued, sufferers can become fatigued quickly with minimal exertion and some might experience neck and back pain. Other symptoms include the feeling of pressure in the brain, mostly around the frontal lobe area, headaches or migraine headaches, ear pain, ear fullness and possibly tinnitus.

Fluctuations in weather also affect sufferers, in particularly hot weather and barometric pressure changes. Many have photo-sensitivity and find it more difficult to walk in the dark as well as other sensitivities to strong smells including chemical smells. Cognitive impairment ("brain fog") includes an inability to recall words, short-term memory loss, an inability to multi-task, misspelling and mispronunciation of words, difficulty in concentrating. Many MdDS sufferers report they are unable to use a computer for any length of time due to the visual overstimulation, and some are even unable to watch television.

Symptoms can be increased by stress, lack of sleep, crowds, flickering lights, loud sounds, fast or sudden movements, enclosed areas and visual intolerance of busy patterns and scrolling movement.

Research reveals MdDS is not migraine-related and many sufferers have never had migraine symptoms prior to the onset of the disorder. However, for some MdDS sufferers there may have been a correlation between migraine and some pathophysiological overlap or even some other precipitating illness.

The condition may be masked by a return to motion such as in a car, train, plane, or boat; however, once the motion ceases, the symptoms rebound or return, often at much higher levels than when the journey first commenced.

The symptoms of MdDS may be extremely debilitating and fluctuate high and low on a daily basis; it greatly affects the daily life and working capacity of sufferers with many having to relinquish work; it also limits most other daily and social activities. Sufferers can have low quality of life in both the physical and emotional realms, comparable to people who have multiple sclerosis with many symptoms being of a similar nature. High levels of disequilibrium can contribute to suffers not being able to drive a car for a long time or walk far and this can create varying levels of anxiety in some or possibly depression due to the significant level of disability.

== Diagnosis ==
MdDS is diagnosed several ways, one being by the symptoms: in particular, the "constant rocking, swaying feeling" and the abatement of this feeling when in motion again and as a matter of exclusion. There are no definitive tests that confirm MdDS, only tests that rule out other conditions. Tests include hearing and balance, and MdDS is generally diagnosed by either a neurologist or an ear, nose, and throat specialist.

Due to the complex nature of the illness, it can be challenging to be properly diagnosed by a specialist. In the past most that suffer from the condition averaged 2–5 medical visits before being diagnosed. Due to the complexity of MdDs most patients self-diagnose, with access to internet information, and confirm their diagnosis with an MdDS specialist. The lack of knowledge of the condition and limited resources leaves patients with limited options. Those options include benzodiazepines, physical vestibular rehabilitation, and migraine medications. Additionally, patients have seen improvement with non-invasive brain stimulation methods, though the long-term implications of this treatment is still to be seen.

== Treatment ==
There is no known cure for MdDS, as with most balance and gait disorders, some form of displacement exercise is thought helpful (for example walking, jogging, or bicycling but not on a treadmill or stationary bicycle). This has not been well-studied in MdDS. Medications that suppress the nerves and brain circuits involved in balance (for example, the benzodiazepine clonazepam) have been noted to help and can lower symptoms; however, it is not a cure. It is not known whether a medication that suppresses symptoms prolongs symptom duration or not. Vestibular therapy has not proved to be effective in treating MdDS.

Additional research was undertaken by Dr Yoon-Hee Cha into the neurological nature of this syndrome through imaging studies but later withdrawn due to faulty study hypothesis.

== Epidemiology ==
The condition is thought to be under-reported in the medical literature. A study of 27 cases conducted by Timothy C. Hain in 1999 noted all but one patient to be female. The average age in this series was 49 years. This apparent gender disparity, however, may be due in part to the fact that the questionnaire which formed the basis of the study was circulated in a publication with a predominantly female reader base.

Subsequent studies have produced conflicting results with regard to the gender distribution of MdDS. The trends in Hain's report have recently been supported by the MdDS Balance Disorder Foundation, in a study of over 100 individuals diagnosed with MdDS. The female:male ratio was approximately 9:1; the average age of onset was 43–45 years. However, another recent study found that 44% of subjects who had experienced MdDS for 2 years or more were male, suggesting a more even distribution.

It has been shown to occur in excursions of as little as 30 minutes though it has been unclear how long it takes for symptoms to occur. The most commonly reported inciting event was a prolonged ocean cruise (~45%); however, shorter boating excursions (~22%), aircraft travel (~15%), and automobile travel (~8%) have all been described.

Mal de Débarquement syndrome has been noted as far back to the times of Erasmus Darwin in 1796, and Irwin J. A. (1881) "The pathology of seasickness".

Cases of MdDS have been reported in children as young as eight and in both genders. Men may have a more difficult time obtaining a diagnosis due to the disparity of women reported. When sailors and soldiers returned from World War II, the syndrome was reported at a higher rate in males

== Research ==
=== Repetitive transcranial magnetic stimulation ===
Despite MdDS causing significant disability, therapy for persistent MdDS remains virtually nonexistent. A pilot study has commenced utilizing repetitive transcranial magnetic stimulation (rTMS) this being a method of neuromodulation in which a local magnetic field is applied over the scalp to induce an electric current in the cortical structures underlying the coil. Low-frequency rTMS (e1 Hz) induces local inhibition, whereas high frequency rTMS (Q5 Hz) induces local excitation. The TMS studies have proved to help in lowering the symptoms of MdDS if the treatment is ongoing; however, it is not a cure.

=== Vestibulo-ocular reflex research ===
At least one clinical trial on readaptation of the vestibulo-ocular reflex undertaken by Dr. Mingjia Dai from Mount Sinai Hospital in New York City produced results for a significant percentage of patients who participated in the program. Dai developed an intervention that provided improvement in symptoms for 70% of the patients in the clinical trial phase. The protocol involved a physical manipulation of the patient intended to readapt the vestibulo-ocular reflex. While the program was no longer in the research phase, Dai continued to accept patients. According to Dai, success was measured as a 50% reduction of symptoms. Since death of Dr. Dai, vestibulo-ocular research are now directed by Dr. Sergei B. Yakushin. During the last nine years Dr. Yakushin published several number of research linked to MdDs such as:

- Yakushin, Sergei B.; Raphan, Theodore; Cho, Catherine (23 May 2022). "Treatment of Gravitational Pulling Sensation in Patients With Mal de Debarquement Syndrome (MdDS): A Model-Based Approach". Frontiers in Integrative Neuroscience. 16. doi:10.3389/fnint.2022.801817. PMC 9168314. PMID 35676926.
- Yakushin, Sergei B.; Zink, Reilly; Clark, Brian C.; Liu, Chang (18 August 2020). "Readaptation Treatment of Mal de Debarquement Syndrome With a Virtual Reality App: A Pilot Study". Frontiers in Neurology. 11: 814. doi:10.3389/fneur.2020.00814. PMC 7461907. PMID 33013617.
- Cohen, Bernard; Yakushin, Sergei B.; Cho, Catherine (5 February 2018). "Hypothesis: The Vestibular and Cerebellar Basis of the Mal de Debarquement Syndrome". Frontiers in Neurology. 9: 28. doi:10.3389/fneur.2018.00028. PMC 5807657. PMID 29459843.

In 2022, Yakushin and colleagues conducted a study that suggested opto-kinetic stimulation as a potential treatment for individuals diagnosed with MdDS who experience gravitational pulling sensations. Participants of this study were exposed to therapeutic interventions, such as vestibular rehabilitation therapy, to stimulate the vestibular-ocular reflex and reform their perception of gravity and motion. The results indicated that opto-kinetic stimulation was effective in alleviating the pulling sensation experienced by MdDS. Over 70% of MdDS patients who participated in this study reported an immediate relief of symptoms following the treatment. Three years following the treatment, 58% of the participants reported that the treatment continued to alleviate the gravitational pulling sensations. These results display the benefits of opto-kinetic stimulation treatments for reducing symptoms of MdDS.

=== Hormonal Research ===
Viviana Mucci postulated that MdDs is a hormonal disorder that only occurs in females. This needs further scrutiny due to issues of using only small sample sizes, using only self-reported survey data that they further tweaked within the paper (see table 5's removal of data "Not Sure" that did not fit their hypothesis), and Mucci's belief that there are no men with this disorder. This is why they only surveyed females about menses, ovulation, menopause, and birth control pill usage. They formulated a theoretical mathematic model attempting to explain a theoretical vestibulo–cerebellar loop. The loop between the "right and left vestibular nuclei, and the Purkinje cells of the right and left flocculonodular cerebellar corte" combined with female menses is the origin of the symptoms according to Mucci.

=== Case Studies ===
A case study conducted by Amuk and colleagues focused on a 30-year-old male patient with MdDS to highlight potential psychiatric comorbidities. The subject of this case study reported the difficulties faced when seeking a diagnosis despite chronic symptoms. Physicians suggested the symptoms were initially caused by psychological distress and prescribed anti-anxiety medications. This patient's experience highlights the overlooked nature of this disorder and the likelihood of misdiagnoses. Moreover, the patient from this case study expressed how the mismanagement of their diagnosis negatively impacted their psychological well-being, highlighting the importance proper diagnosis and symptom management.

In 2023, Ramesh and fellow researchers utilized a case study format to bring attention to the lack of research pertaining to pediatric patients with MdDS. It was mentioned the lack of research is expected since MdDS is known to affect middle-aged individuals for the most part. Despite this, Ramesh and colleagues recruited three patients with MdDS between the ages of 7 and 16 for this case study in an attempt to gain insight of treatment among pediatric patients. These patients were treated with medications such as Clonazepam, Escitalopram, and Venlafaxine. Treatment additionally included therapeutic intervention like opto-kinetic stimulation and vestibular ocular reflex exercises. It was described that all three of the patients reported experiencing migraines, which is a common symptom reported by adults patients with MdDS. Moreover, it was expressed that two of the pediatric patients were diagnosed with generalized anxiety disorder and the third patient reported experiencing symptoms of anxiety. This emphasizes the presence of psychiatric comorbidities associated with MdDS. Researchers also emphasized how this displays the importance of proper and timely diagnosis to prevent impacting the likelihood of mental distress. This study insinuates a need for further research is encouraged in order to improve general understanding of this condition and improve diagnostic challenges.

== See also ==
- Motion sickness (seasickness, travel sickness)
- Space adaptation syndrome (space flight "zero-g" and return)
