= Broken escalator phenomenon =

Illusion when stepping onto a broken escalator

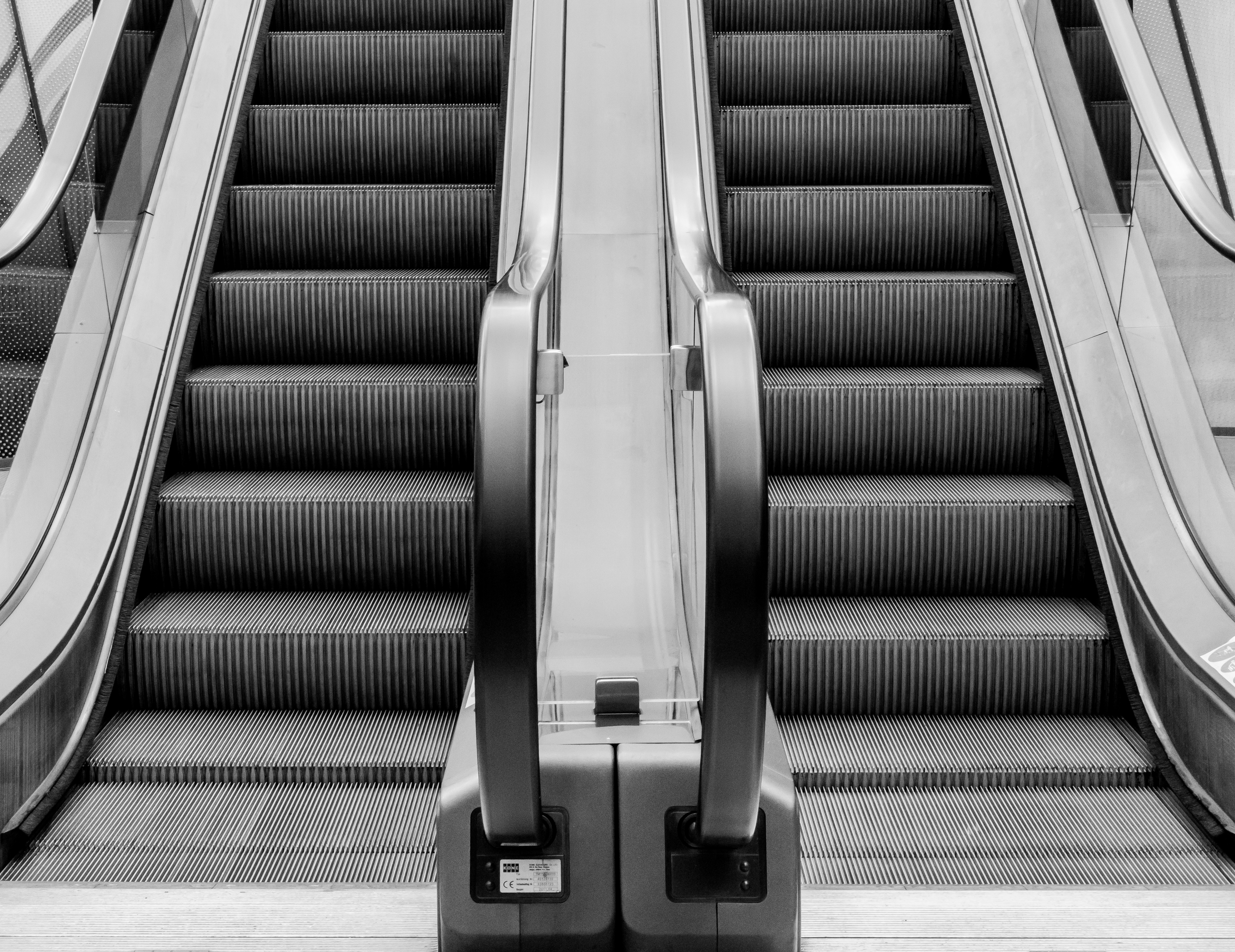
The foot of an escalator

The broken escalator phenomenon is the sensation of losing balance, confusion or dizziness reported by some people when stepping onto an escalator which is not working. It is said that there is a brief, odd sensation of imbalance, despite full awareness that the escalator is not going to move.

It has been shown that this effect causes people to step inappropriately fast onto a moving platform that is no longer moving, even when this is obvious to the participant.

Even though subjects are fully aware that the platform or escalator is not moving now, parts of their brains still act on previous experience gained when it was moving, and so misjudge how to step onto it. Thus, this effect demonstrates the separateness of the declarative and procedural functions of the brain.

The broken escalator phenomenon is the result of a locomotor after-effect which replicates the posture adopted when walking onto a moving platform to stabilise oneself. This after-effect was studied by Adolfo Bronstein and Raymond Reynolds in an experiment published in 2003, then explored further through a series of additional experiments by Bronstein and associates.

The phenomenon was originally discussed by Brian Simpson (1992) who named it the "escalator effect" and regarded it as the perceptual consequence of a failed expectation. He thought it had something in common with the Duncker Effect. He also considered the related sensation experienced on alighting from a stationary escalator.

== Initial experiment ==
Bronstein and Reynolds' initial experiment attempted to reproduce the conditions of the broken escalator phenomenon by asking subjects to walk onto a stationary sled (BEFORE trials), then walk onto it while it was moving (MOVING trials), and finally once again while it was stationary (AFTER trials). Subjects all experienced an after-effect when walking onto the stationary sled in the AFTER trials, characterised by a forward sway of the torso, increased walking speed and increased muscular leg activity (measured with EMG) compared to the BEFORE condition. All subjects expressed surprise at their behaviour and compared the experience to that of walking onto an out-of-order escalator.

== Motor adaptation ==
The after-effect was found to be a direct consequence of motor adaptation. When facing an external threat to our balance, our central nervous system will trigger neural processes in order to stabilise our posture. In this case, when walking onto a moving platform – such as a moving escalator – people will adopt methods to prevent a backwards fall. In the MOVING trials of the experiment, these methods consist of a forward sway of the torso, increased gait velocity and increased leg EMG activity. Thus, when we step onto a moving escalator, we alter our posture and gait in order to stabilise ourselves against this external threat to our balance.

The after-effect consists of an inappropriate expression of this method. In the AFTER trials, instead of walking onto the stationary sled the same way they did for the BEFORE trials, subjects adopted a similar method to the MOVING trials. This resulted in them walking inappropriately fast and excessively swaying their torso when stepping onto the sled, leading to a sensation of dizziness. Similarly, when walking onto the non moving escalator, people adopt the same method that they use for a moving escalator, therefore almost failing to keep their balance.

== Dissociation between the cognitive and motor systems ==
The broken escalator phenomenon is the result of the dissociation between the declarative and procedural functions of the central nervous system. The central nervous system enables us to adapt to the movement of the escalator, however this locomotor adaptation is inappropriately expressed when walking onto a broken escalator. Aware that the escalator will not move, we still modify our gait and posture as if to adapt to movement. This shows a separation between our declarative (or cognitive) system and our procedural (or motor) system – between what we know and what we do.

In the brain, declarative memory processes memories we are consciously aware of, whereas procedural memory processes our movements. The fact that we walk inappropriately fast onto an escalator we know to be broken is evidence of motor adaptation without declarative memory. The motor system operates without cognitive control, leading to the unconscious generation of the after-effect. Subjects in an additional experiment were indeed unable to suppress the after-effect even when consciously and voluntarily attempting to do so.

== Pre-emptive postural response ==
Bronstein et al. remarked in 2013 that signs of the after-effect could be measured before foot-sled contact, suggesting that the after-effect is what they labelled a 'pre-emptive postural response'.

The after-effect is pre-emptive in that it anticipates a threat to balance rather than being triggered by one. Postural control is usually generated by an external threat, for example a slippery surface will lead to a more cautionary gait, but in this case the postural adaptation is an aversive, 'just in case' strategy. When stepping onto the broken escalator, the person will anticipate its movement, just to make sure they would not fall if the escalator were to move. The person undertakes a 'worst-case scenario' which seems the most strategic option: preparing for the platform to move even though it won't is better than the opposite.

Indeed, as well as the distinction between the motor and cognitive systems, another factor leading to the after-effect has been argued to be fear-related mechanisms. The fear of falling if somehow the escalator moved could be enough to adopt a precautionary behaviour despite knowledge that it is broken. Fear-related mechanisms are indeed known to be impervious to cognitive control.

However, another experiment demonstrated that the aftereffect was not as intense when subjects walked onto the stationary sled with the opposite leg of the one they'd stepped with in the MOVING trials. If the after-effect was generated by a fear that the platform would move, it would be triggered whenever and however the subject stepped onto it. This therefore suggests that the after-effect is mainly generated by procedural memory, which is most intense when the conditions of the adaptation phase are perfectly replicated.

== 'Braking' the after-effect ==
The after-effect is an internally generated postural threat which must be dealt with. Without a 'braking' system to reduce its impact on our balance, we would fall when stepping onto a stationary escalator.

External threats to our balance are dealt with by the vestibular system. However, a 2008 experiment showed that the intensity of the after-effect in subjects lacking a vestibular function (labyrinthine defective subjects) was not superior to normal subjects, suggesting that the vestibular system is not responsible for 'braking' the aftereffect. Instead, in the first AFTER trial (when the after-effect is the strongest) an increase in leg EMG activity is observed for all subjects. This increase is generated unconsciously and before foot-sled contact. The 'braking' of the after-effect is therefore an anticipatory process, rather than being triggered by an external threat: the central nervous system anticipates that the after-effect will occur and that it will threaten our balance, and generates mechanisms to deal with the threat. When stepping onto a stationary escalator, anticipatory motor mechanisms prevent us from falling by attenuating the after-effect.

== See also ==
- Balance disorder – Physiological disturbance of perception
- Ideomotor phenomenon – Concept in hypnosis and psychological research
- Illusions of self-motion – Misperception of one's location or movement
- Motion sickness – Nausea caused by motion or perceived motion
- Proprioception – Sense of self-movement, force, and body position
- Sense of balance, also known as Equilibrioception – Physiological sense regarding posture
- Spatial disorientation – Inability of a person to correctly determine their body position in space
- Vertigo – Type of dizziness where a person has the sensation of moving or surrounding objects moving
