= MDD =

MDD may refer to:

- Major depressive disorder, a mental disorder involving persistent low mood, low self-esteem and loss of interest. It is also known as clinical depression.
- Mate-Demate Device, a specialized crane used to piggyback the Space Shuttle onto an airplane
- Mammal Diversity Database, online checklist of mammal species maintained by the American Society of Mammalogists
- Medical Devices Directive
- Mernda railway station, Melbourne
- Midland Airpark (IATA: MDD), a public use airport in Midland, Texas
- Mine detection dogs
- Ministry of Defence (Italy), known natively as Ministero della Difesa
- Mirrored Drive Door, a case design for the Power Mac G4
- Model-driven development, a software engineering discipline
- Movement for Direct Democracy, defunct Venezuelan political party.
