= Spatial disorientation =

Inability of a person to correctly determine their body position in space

Spatial disorientation is the inability to determine position or relative motion, commonly occurring during periods of challenging visibility, since vision is the dominant sense for orientation. The auditory system, vestibular system (within the inner ear), and proprioceptive system (sensory receptors located in the skin, muscles, tendons and joints) collectively work to coordinate movement with balance, and can also create illusory nonvisual sensations, resulting in spatial disorientation in the absence of strong visual cues.

In aviation, spatial disorientation can result in improper perception of the attitude of the aircraft, referring to the orientation of the aircraft relative to the horizon. If a pilot relies on this improper perception, this can result in inadvertent turning, ascending or descending. For aviators, proper recognition of aircraft attitude is most critical at night or in poor weather, when there is no visible horizon; in these conditions, aviators may determine aircraft attitude by reference to an attitude indicator. Spatial disorientation can occur in other situations where visibility is reduced, such as diving operations.

== Flight safety, history, and statistics ==
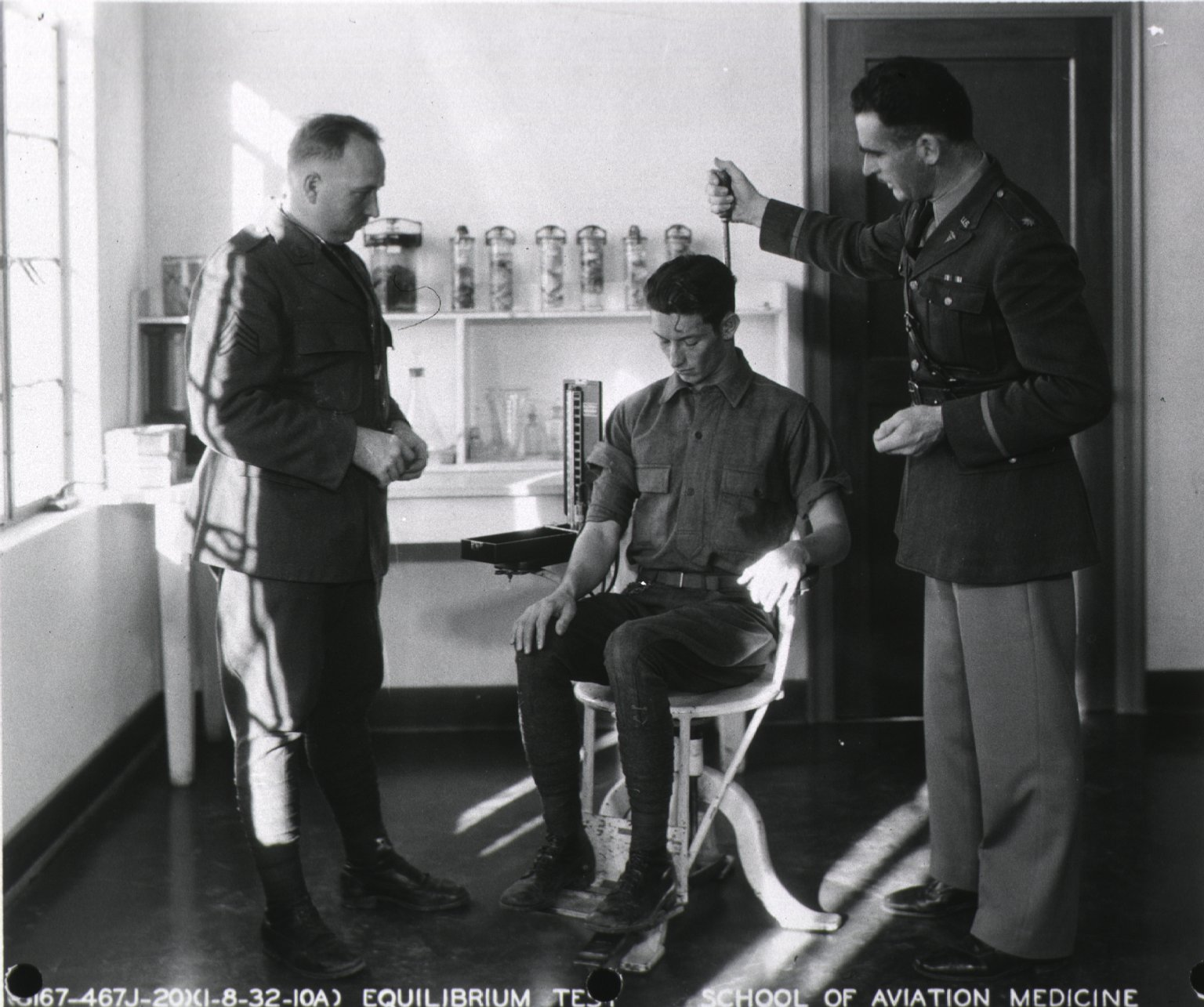
Equilibrium test being administered to prospective pilot, via Bárány chair

Spatial orientation in flight is difficult to achieve because numerous sensory stimuli (visual, vestibular, and proprioceptive) vary in magnitude, direction, and frequency. Any differences or discrepancies between visual, vestibular, and proprioceptive sensory inputs result in a sensory mismatch that can produce illusions and lead to spatial disorientation. The visual sense is considered to be the largest contributor to orientation.

While testing an early turn and slip indicator devised by his friend Elmer Sperry in 1918, United States Army Air Corps pilot William Ocker entered a graveyard spiral while flying through clouds without visual references; the turn indicator showed he was in a turn, but his senses told him he was in level flight. Emerging from the clouds, Ocker was able to recover from the dive. In 1926, Ocker was subjected to a Bárány chair equilibrium test by Dr. David A. Myers at Crissy Field; the resulting duplication of the somatogyral illusion he had experienced and a subsequent re-test, which he passed using the turn indicator, led him to develop and champion instrumented flight. Sperry would go on to invent the gyrocompass and attitude indicator, both of which were being tested by 1930. With Lt. Carl Crane, Ocker published the instructional text Blind Flying in Theory and Practice in 1932. Influential advocates of instrumented flight training included Albert Hegenberger and Jimmy Doolittle.

In 1965, the Federal Aviation Agency of the United States issued Advisory Circular AC 60-4, warning pilots about the hazards of spatial disorientation, which may result from operation under visual flight rules in conditions of marginal visibility. A new version of the advisory was issued in 1983 as AC 60-4A, defining spatial disorientation as "the inability to tell which way is 'up.'"

Statistics show that between 5% and 10% of all general aviation accidents can be attributed to spatial disorientation, 90% of which are fatal. Spatial-D and G-force induced loss of consciousness (g-LOC) are two of the most common causes of death from human factors in military aviation. A study on the prevalence of spatial disorientation incidents concluded that "if a pilot flies long enough ... there is no chance that he/she will escape experiencing at least one episode of [spatial disorientation]. Looked at another way, pilots can be considered to be in one of two groups; those who have been disorientated, and those who will be."

Training and awareness campaigns have also addressed spatial disorientation risk associated with continued visual flight into instrument meteorological conditions (IMC). In the United States, the U.S. Helicopter Safety Team (USHST) produced the 56 Seconds to Live training video and related materials about unintended IMC (UIMC), depicting a VFR helicopter pilot losing control after entering cloud; the campaign is used in safety education to emphasize early avoidance decisions and prompt transition to instrument flying when appropriate.

== Physiology ==
There are four physiologic systems that interact to allow humans to orient themselves in space. Vision is the dominant sense for orientation, but the vestibular system, proprioceptive system and auditory system also play a role.

Spatial orientation (the inverse being spatial disorientation, aka spatial-D) is the ability to maintain body orientation and posture in relation to the surrounding environment (physical space) at rest and during motion. Humans have evolved to maintain spatial orientation on the ground. Good spatial orientation on the ground relies on the use of visual, auditory, vestibular, and proprioceptive sensory information. Changes in linear acceleration, angular acceleration, and gravity are detected by the vestibular system and the proprioceptive receptors, and then compared in the brain with visual information.

The three-dimensional environment of flight is unfamiliar to the human body, creating sensory conflicts and illusions that make spatial orientation difficult and sometimes impossible to achieve. The result of these various visual and nonvisual illusions is spatial disorientation. Various models have been developed to yield quantitative predictions of disorientation associated with known aircraft accelerations.

== Vestibular system and sensory illusions ==
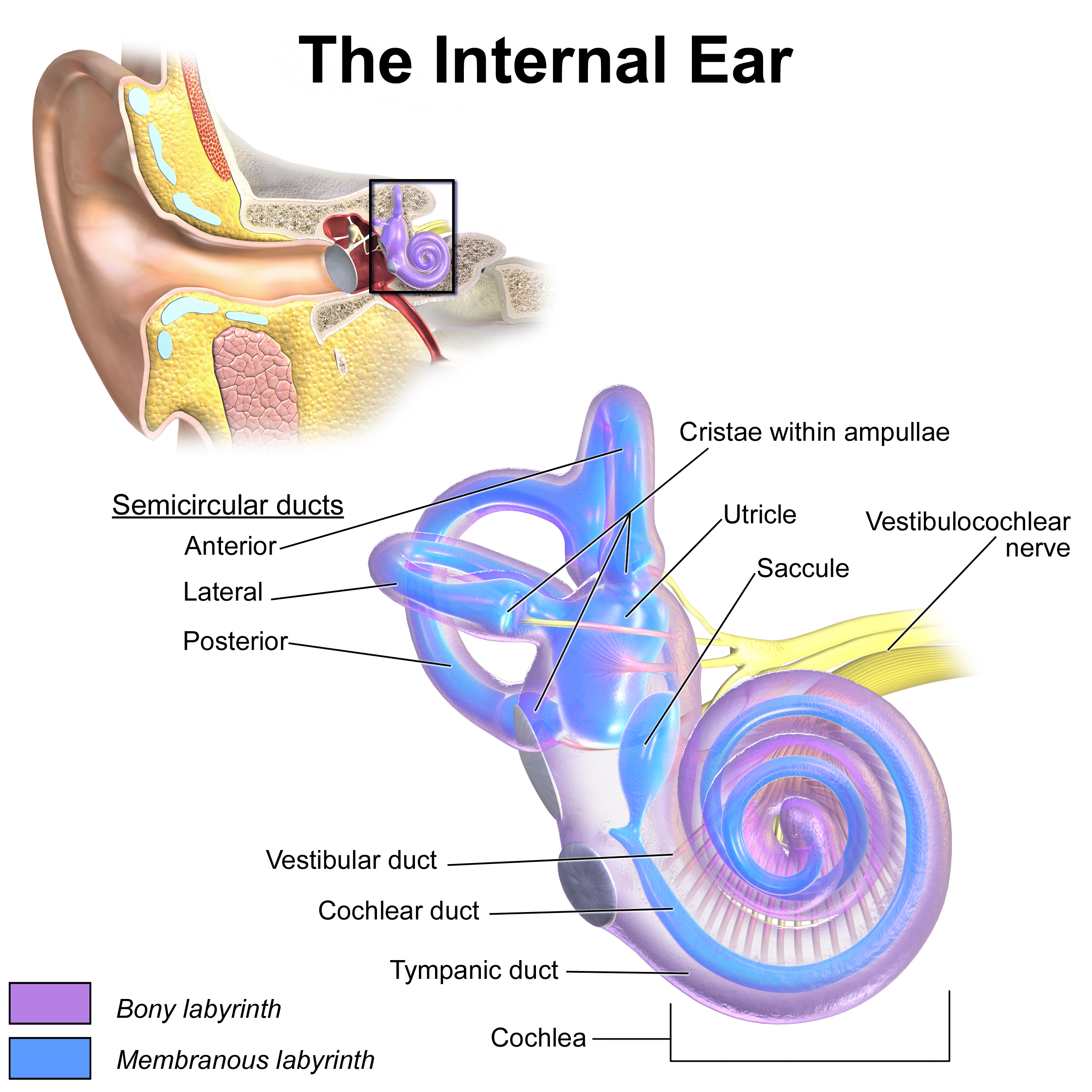
Inner ear

The vestibular system detects linear and angular (rotational) acceleration using specialized organs in the inner ear. Linear accelerations are detected by the otolith organs, while angular accelerations are detected by the semicircular canals.

=== Misleading sensations ===
Without a visual reference or cues, such as a visible horizon, humans will rely on non-visual senses to establish their sense of motion and equilibrium. During the abnormal acceleratory environment of flight, the vestibular and proprioceptive systems can be misled, resulting in spatial disorientation. When an aircraft is maneuvering, inertial forces can be created by changes in vehicle speed (linear acceleration) and changes in direction (rotational acceleration and centrifugal force), resulting in perceptual misjudgment of the vertical, as the combined forces of gravity and inertia do not align with what the vestibular system assumes is the vertical direction of gravity (towards the center of the Earth).

Under ideal conditions, visual cues will provide sufficient information to override illusory vestibular inputs, but at night or in poor weather, visual inputs can be overwhelmed by these illusory nonvisual sensations, resulting in spatial disorientation. Low visibility flight conditions include night, over water or other monotonous/featureless terrain that blends into the sky, white-out weather, or inadvertent entry into instrument meteorological conditions after flying into fog or clouds.

Lift (L) and weight/gravity (w) forces acting on an aircraft making a banked or coordinated turn

For example, in an aircraft that is making a coordinated (banked) turn, no matter how steep, occupants will have little or no sensation of being tilted in the air unless the horizon is visible, as the combined forces of lift and gravity are felt as pressing the occupant into the seat without a lateral force sliding them to either side. Similarly, it is possible to gradually climb or descend without a noticeable change in pressure against the seat. In some aircraft, it is possible to execute a loop without pulling negative g-forces so that, without visual reference, the pilot could be upside down without being aware of it. A gradual change in any direction of movement may not be strong enough to activate the vestibular system, so the pilot may not realize that the aircraft is accelerating, decelerating, or banking.

Standard set of flight instruments, including attitude indicator (top center) and turn and slip indicator (bottom left)

Gyroscopic flight instruments such as the attitude indicator (artificial horizon) and the turn and slip indicator are designed to provide information to counteract misleading sensations from the non-visual senses.

=== Otoliths and somatogravic illusions ===
Two otolith organs, the saccule and utricle, are located in each ear and are set at right angles to each other. The utricle detects changes in linear acceleration in the horizontal plane, while the saccule detects linear accelerations in the vertical plane; humans have evolved to assume the vertical acceleration is caused by gravity. However, the saccule and utricle can provide misleading sensory perception when gravity is not limited to the vertical plane, or when vehicle speeds and accelerations result in inertial forces comparable to the force of gravity, as the otoliths only detect acceleration, and cannot distinguish inertial forces from the force of gravity. Some examples of this include the inertial forces experienced during a vertical take-off in a helicopter or following the sudden opening of a parachute after a free fall.

Illusions caused by the otolith organs are called somatogravic illusions and include the Inversion, Head-Up, and Head-Down Illusions. The Inversion Illusion results from a steep ascent followed by a sudden return to level flight; the resulting relative increase in forward speed produces an illusion the aircraft is inverted. The Head-Up and Head-Down illusions are similar, involving sudden linear acceleration (Head-Up) or deceleration (Head-Down), leading to a misperception the nose of the aircraft is pitching up (Head-Up) or down (Head-Down); the aviator could be fooled into pitching the nose down (Head-Up) or up (Head-Down) in response, leading to a crash or a stall, respectively.

Typically, the Head-Up illusion occurs during take-off, as a strong linear acceleration is used to generate lift over the wing and flaps. Without a visual reference, the pilot may assume from the vestibular system the nose has pitched up and command a dive; if this occurs during take-off, the aircraft may not have sufficient altitude to recover before crashing into the ground.

=== Semicircular canals and somatogyral illusions ===
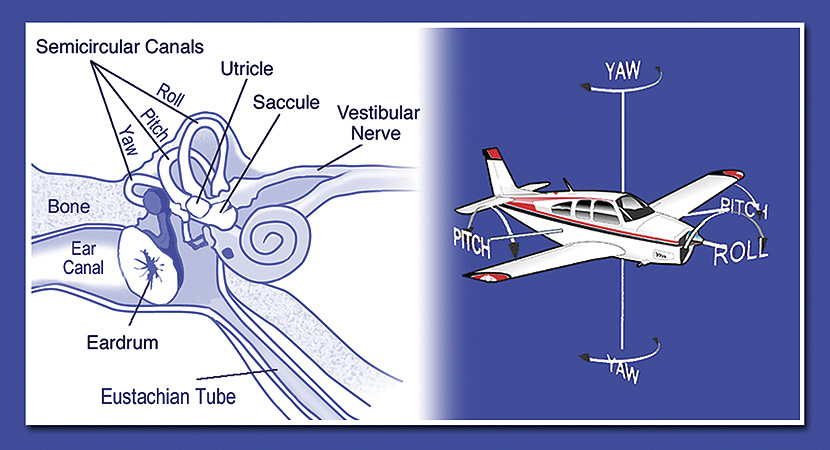
Inner ear with semicircular canals shown, likening them to the roll, pitch and yaw axis of an aircraft

In addition, the inner ear contains rotational accelerometers, known as the semicircular canals, which provide information to the lower brain on rotational accelerations in the pitch, roll and yaw axes. Changes in angular velocity are detected from the relative motion between the fluid in the canals and the canal itself, which is fixed to the head; because of inertia, the fluid in the canals tends to lag when the head moves, signaling a rotational acceleration. However, semicircular canal output ceases after prolonged rotation (beyond 15–20 s) as the fluid has now been entrained into motion through friction, matching the motion of the head. If the rotation is then stopped, the perceived motion signal from the inner ear indicates the aviator is now turning in the opposite direction from actual travel, as the fluid continues to move while the canal has stopped. In addition, the inertia of the fluid means the detection threshold of rotational acceleration is limited to approximately 2°/sec^{2}; angular accelerations below this value cannot be detected. Specific common somatogyral illusions induced by the semicircular canals are the Leans, Graveyard Spin, Graveyard Spiral, and Coriolis.

If the aircraft enters an unnoticed, prolonged turn gradually, then suddenly returns to level flight, the leans may result. The gradual turn sets the fluid into the semicircular canals into motion, and rotational acceleration of two degrees per second (or less) cannot be detected. Once the aircraft suddenly returns to level flight, the continued fluid motion gives the sensation the aircraft is banking in the opposite direction of the turn that just ended; the aviator may attempt to correct the misperception of the vertical by banking into the original turn. The leans is considered the most common form of spatial disorientation.

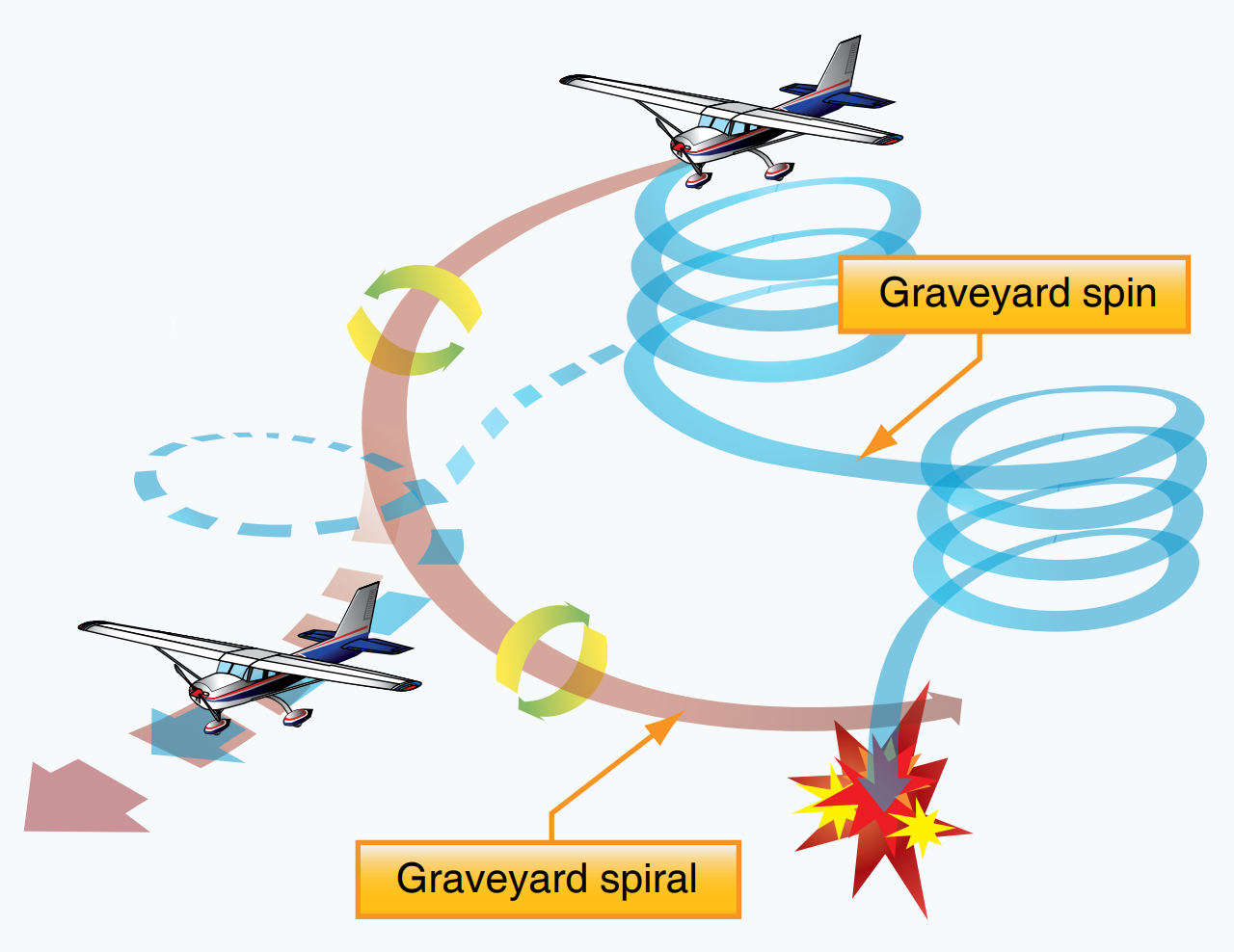
Graveyard spiral and graveyard spin

The graveyard spiral and graveyard spin are both caused by the acclimation of the semicircular canals to prolonged rotation; after a banked turn (in the case of the graveyard spiral) or spin (for the graveyard spin) of approximately 20 seconds, the fluid in the semicircular canals has been entrained into motion by friction, and the vestibular system no longer perceives a rotational acceleration. If the aviator then ends the turn or spin and returns to level flight, the continued motion of the fluid will cause a sensation the aircraft is turning or spinning in the opposite direction, and the pilot may re-enter the original turn or spin inadvertently; the aviator may not recognize the illusion before the aircraft loses too much altitude, resulting in a collision with terrain or the g-forces on the aircraft may exceed the structural strength of the airframe, resulting in catastrophic failure. One of the most infamous mishaps in aviation history involving the graveyard spiral is the crash involving John F. Kennedy Jr. in 1999.

Once an aircraft enters conditions under which the pilot cannot see a distinct visual horizon, the drift in the inner ear continues uncorrected. Errors in the perceived rate of turn about any axis can build up at a rate of 0.2 to 0.3 degrees per second. If the pilot is not proficient in the use of gyroscopic flight instruments, these errors will build up to a point that control of the aircraft is lost, usually in a steep, diving turn known as a graveyard spiral. During the entire time, leading up to and well into the maneuver, the pilot remains unaware of the turning, believing that the aircraft is maintaining straight flight.

In a 1954 study (180 – Degree Turn Experiment), the University of Illinois Institute of Aviation found that 19 out of 20 non-instrument-rated subject pilots went into a graveyard spiral soon after entering simulated instrument conditions. The 20th pilot also lost control of his aircraft, but in another maneuver. The average time between onset of instrument conditions and loss of control was 178 seconds.

Spatial disorientation can also affect instrument-rated pilots in certain conditions. A powerful tumbling sensation (vertigo) can result if the pilot moves his or her head too much during instrument flight. This is called the Coriolis illusion. Because the semicircular canals are set in three different axes of rotation, if the aviator suddenly moves their head during a rotational acceleration, one canal may abruptly start to detect an angular acceleration while another ceases, resulting in a tumbling sensation.

== Visual illusions ==
Even with good visibility, misleading visual inputs such as sloping cloud decks, unfamiliar runway grades, or false horizons can also form optical illusions, resulting in the pilot misjudging the vertical orientation, aircraft speed or altitude, and/or distance and depth perception; these could even combine with nonvisual illusions from the vestibular and proprioceptive systems to produce an even more powerful illusion.

== Examples ==
Selected list of aviation accidents attributed to spatial disorientation
Date	Location	Accident/Flight	Notes & Refs.
Feb 3, 1959	Clear Lake, Iowa, USA	The Day the Music Died	Crash of Beechcraft Bonanza that killed Buddy Holly, Ritchie Valens, and "The Big Bopper" J. P. Richardson; pilot was not qualified for instrumented flight but took off into deteriorating weather because the passengers were important. Forensic evidence showed the aircraft was in a steep right bank (90°), nose-down attitude at 3,000 ft/min (910 m/min) when it crashed.
Mar 5, 1963	Camden, Tennessee, USA	1963 Camden PA-24 crash	Four deaths, including singer Patsy Cline.
Jul 31, 1964	Brentwood, Nashville, Tennessee, USA	1964 Beechcraft Debonair crash	It is believed that singer Jim Reeves was suffering from spatial disorientation when his Beechcraft aircraft crashed in the Brentwood area of Nashville, Tennessee, during a violent thunderstorm on July 31, 1964, claiming the lives of both Reeves and his pianist Dean Manuel.
Jan 1, 1978	Arabian Sea, near Santacruz Airport, Bombay, India	Air India Flight 855	
Oct 21, 1978	Bass Strait, Australia	Disappearance of Frederick Valentich	
Jun 6, 1992	Darién Gap, near Tucutí, Panama	Copa Airlines Flight 201	
Jul 16, 1999	Atlantic Ocean, off the west coast of Martha's Vineyard, Massachusetts, USA	John F. Kennedy Jr. plane crash	Crash occurred during a night flight over water near Martha's Vineyard. Subsequent investigation pointed to spatial disorientation as a probable cause of the accident. Because of pilot John F. Kennedy Jr.'s fame, the cause of the crash led to extensive reporting of spatial disorientation in the press in 1999.
Jan 10, 2000	Niederhasli, Switzerland	Crossair Flight 498	
Aug 23, 2000	Persian Gulf, near Bahrain International Airport, Bahrain	Gulf Air Flight 072	
Oct 16, 2000	Hillsboro, Missouri, USA	2000 Cessna 335 crash	Left-side attitude indicator failed and pilot kept turning his head to cross-check the right-side (co-pilot position) attitude indicator, leading to spatial disorientation; the crash killed Missouri Governor Mel Carnahan.
Jan 3, 2004	Red Sea, near Sharm El Sheikh International Airport, Egypt	Flash Airlines Flight 604	Disputed cause: possible pilot error (from spatial disorientation) or mechanical/software malfunctions
Mar 15, 2005	near Campbeltown, Argyll, Scotland	2005 Loganair Islander accident	
Jan 1, 2007	Makassar Strait off Majene, Sulawesi, Indonesia	Adam Air Flight 574	Due to the crew's focus on troubleshooting a problem with the INS, they had disconnected the autopilot without noticing and did not realize that they were in a descent until recovery was improbable. The G forces on the aircraft were stressing the hull of the aircraft and further disoriented the crew until the aircraft broke up in mid-air.
May 5, 2007	Douala International Airport, Cameroon	Kenya Airways Flight 507	
Nov 30, 2007	Türbetepe, Keçiborlu, Isparta Province, Turkey	Atlasjet Flight 4203	
Sep 14, 2008	Perm, Russia	Aeroflot Flight 821	
Jun 1, 2009	over Atlantic Ocean, near waypoint TASIL	Air France Flight 447	
May 12, 2010	Tripoli International Airport, Libya	Afriqiyah Airways Flight 771	
Aug 24, 2010	near Shikharpur, Nepal	Agni Air Flight 101	
Oct 1, 2012	Upper Kandanga, Queensland, Australia	2012 Queensland DH.84 Dragon crash	Vintage aircraft named Riama
Mar 19, 2016	Rostov-on-Don, Russia	Flydubai Flight 981	
May 12, 2018	near Centennial Airport, Colorado, USA	Cirrus SR22 crash	Federal investigators determined that pilot disorientation in difficult weather conditions likely was the cause of a fatal small plane crash.
Feb 23, 2019	Trinity Bay, Texas, USA	Atlas Air Flight 3591	The crash of the Boeing 767 cargo jet was caused by the inappropriate response by the first officer as the pilot flying to an inadvertent activation of the plane's go-around mode at a high altitude (6,200 feet), which led to his spatial disorientation.
Apr 9, 2019	near Aomori Prefecture, Japan	2019 JASDF F-35 crash	First crash of an F-35A; pilot descended rapidly during a simultaneous left-hand turn.
Jan 26, 2020	Calabasas, California, USA	2020 Calabasas helicopter crash	Ara Zobayan, the helicopter pilot in the fatal accident that killed Kobe Bryant along with his daughter Gianna and six others on January 26, 2020, was determined to have likely experienced spatial disorientation according to NTSB investigation.

== See also ==
- Balance disorder – Physiological disturbance of perception
- Bárány chair – Device used for aerospace physiology training
- Broken escalator phenomenon – Illusion when stepping onto a broken escalator
- Brownout (aeronautics) – In-flight visual impairment by pilots
- Dizziness – Neurological condition causing impairment in spatial perception and stability
- Equilibrioception – Physiological sense regarding posture
- Ideomotor phenomenon – Concept in hypnosis and psychological research
- Illusions of self-motion – Misperception of one's location or movement
- Motion sickness – Nausea caused by motion or perceived motion
- Pilot error – Decision, action, or inaction by an aircraft pilot
- Proprioception – Sense of self-orientation
- Sense of direction
- Sensory illusions in aviation – Misjudgment of true orientation by pilots
- Situation awareness – Perception of one's environment
- Spatial ability
- Topographical disorientation
