= PrivateFly =

Private jet charter broker

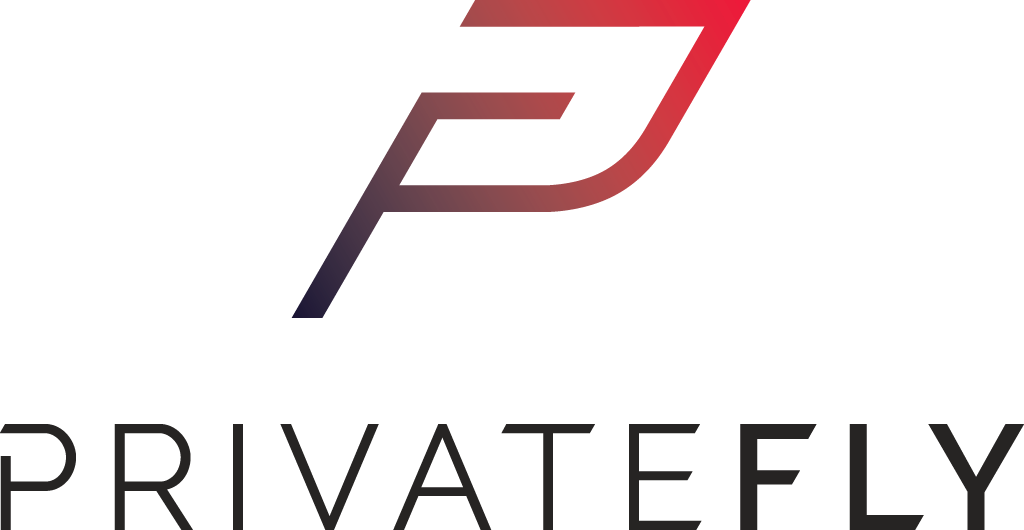
- Industry: Aviation
- Founder: Adam Twidell & Carol Cork
- Headquarters: United Kingdom
- Key people: Adam Twidell CEO
- Services: private jet charter, Jet Card, City Pairs
- Owner: Directional Aviation
- Parent: Directional Aviation
- Website: privatefly.com

PrivateFly is a global private jet charter broker company with websites covering 19 countries: (Australia, Canada, China, Czech Republic, France, Germany, Hungary, Italy, Netherlands, New Zealand, Poland, Qatar, Russia, Slovakia, Spain, Switzerland, UAE, United Kingdom, and the United States). The company's main headquarters are in St Albans, Hertfordshire, England. The company is a member of ACANA, BACA, EBAA and NBAA aviation industry bodies. In 2018 PrivateFly became part of Directional Aviation's OneSky portfolio of companies.

The company uses technology to disrupt the traditional jet charter brokering model launching a website with online estimates and quotes, and also offering apps for iPhone, iPad and Android devices.

It provides a white-label service and partners with several companies including Lastminute.com, Manchester Airport Group and Addison Lee.

== History ==
PrivateFly was launched in 2008 by ex-RAF and NetJets pilot, Adam Twidell and Carol Cork.

The company expanded and had several veteran figures from the travel industry on the board including Martin George and Damon de Laszlo.

It received awards including the Smarta's Top 100 small businesses for 2010, Best Business Award "Best Innovation", Flight Global's Site of the Year Webbies award and Everline Future 50.

PrivateFly was listed 4th in The Sunday Times Fast Track SME Export Track 100 (Britain's SMEs with the fastest-growing international sales) and 46th in The Sunday Times Fast Track Tech Track 100 (Britain's fastest-growing private technology companies).

In 2011, it raised a £2 million investment through several investors to help further develop their European expansion.

In 2016, the company opened an office in Fort Lauderdale, Florida It became the first UK Argus Certified Broker in 2016.

PrivateFly runs an annual poll to find the Top 10 Airport Approaches. Previous winners include Sion Airport, Barra Airport, Sint Maarten Airport, Queenstown Airport, Nice Airport and Malta Airport.

In September 2018 PrivateFly was acquired by the Directional Aviation OneSky group.

In August 2020, PrivateFly launched a new Private Jet Card offering guaranteed aircraft availability and fixed hourly private jet prices for flights in the Europe and USA.

In 2022, PrivateFly has reported a record-breaking increase in jet card sales for the first quarter of this year, experiencing a 258% surge in demand compared to the same timeframe last year.
