= Dizziness =

Neurological condition causing impairment in spatial perception and stability

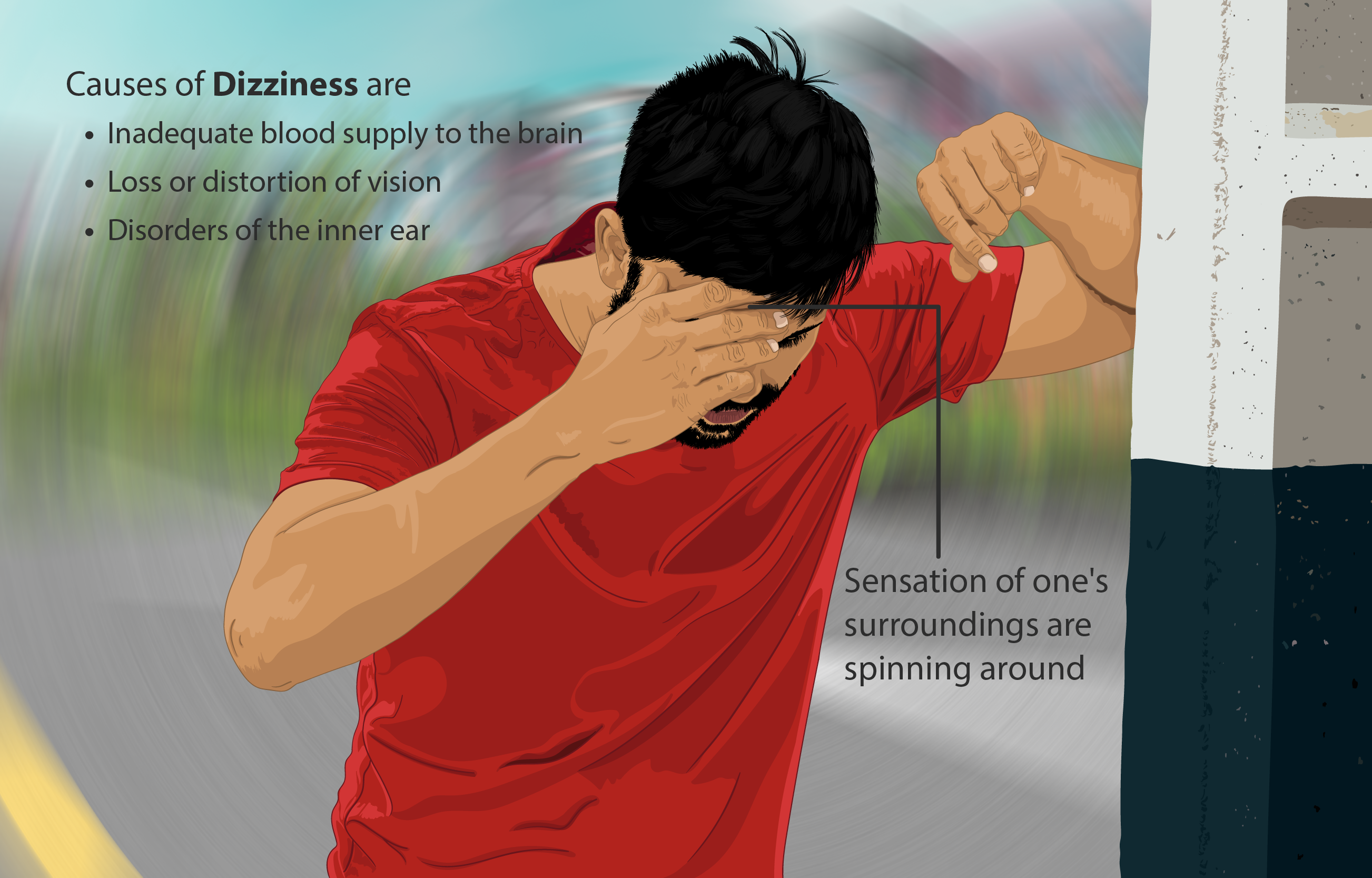
- Depiction of a person feeling dizzy
- Specialty: Otorhinolaryngology, neurology
- Symptoms: lightheadedness, giddiness, or unsteadiness
- Usual onset: Vertigo

Dizziness is an imprecise term that can refer to a sense of disorientation in space, vertigo, or lightheadedness. It can also refer to disequilibrium or a non-specific feeling, such as giddiness or foolishness.

Dizziness is a common medical complaint, affecting 20–30% of persons. Dizziness is broken down into four main subtypes: vertigo (~25–50%), disequilibrium (less than ~15%), presyncope (less than ~15%), and nonspecific dizziness (~10%).

- Vertigo is the sensation of spinning or having one's surroundings spin about them. Many people find vertigo very disturbing and often report associated nausea and vomiting.
- Presyncope describes lightheadedness or feeling faint; the name relates to syncope, which is actually fainting.
- Disequilibrium is the sensation of being off balance and is most often characterized by frequent falls in a specific direction. This condition is not often associated with nausea or vomiting.
- Non-specific dizziness such as persistent postural-perceptual dizziness may be psychiatric in origin. It is a diagnosis of exclusion and can sometimes be brought about by hyperventilation.

== Mechanism and causes ==
Many conditions cause dizziness because multiple parts of the body are required for maintaining balance including the inner ear, eyes, muscles, skeleton, and the nervous system. Thus dizziness can be caused by a variety of problems and may reflect a focal process (such as one affecting balance or coordination) or a diffuse one (such as a toxic exposure or low perfusion state).

Common causes of dizziness include:

- Inadequate blood supply to the brain due to:
  - A sudden fall in blood pressure
  - Heart problems or artery blockages
  - Anemias, such as vitamin B_{12} deficiency anemia, iron deficiency anemia
- Loss or distortion of vision or visual cues
- Standing too quickly/prolonged standing
- Vertigo
- Disorders of the inner ear
- Dehydration
- Distortion of neurological function by medications such as anticonvulsants and sedatives
- Dysfunction of cervical proprioception
- Side effects from other prescription drugs, such as proton-pump inhibitors or coumadin (warfarin)

== Diagnosis ==
=== Differential diagnosis ===
Dizziness may occur from an abnormality involving the brain (in particular the brainstem or cerebellum), inner ear, eyes, heart, vascular system, fluid or blood volume, spinal cord, peripheral nerves, or body electrolytes. Dizziness can accompany certain serious events, such as a concussion or brain bleed, epilepsy and seizures (convulsions), stroke, and cases of meningitis and encephalitis. However, the most common subcategories can be broken down as follows: 40% peripheral vestibular dysfunction, 10% central nervous system lesion, 15% psychiatric disorder, 25% presyncope/disequilibrium, and 10% nonspecific dizziness. Some vestibular pathologies have symptoms that are comorbid with mental disorders.

While traditional medical teaching has focused on determining the cause of dizziness based on the category (such as vertigo vs. presyncope), research published in 2017 suggests that this analysis is of limited clinical utility.

Medical conditions that often have dizziness as a symptom include:

- Benign paroxysmal positional vertigo
- Ménière's disease
- Labyrinthitis
- Otitis media
- Brain tumor
- Acoustic neuroma
- Motion sickness
- Ramsay Hunt syndrome
- Fatal Familial Insomnia
- Migraine
- Multiple sclerosis
- Pregnancy
- Low blood pressure (hypotension)
- Low blood oxygen content (hypoxemia)
- Heart attack
- Iron deficiency (anemia)
- Vitamin B_{12} deficiency
- Low blood sugar (hypoglycemia)
- Hormonal changes (e.g. thyroid disease, menstruation, pregnancy)
- Panic disorder
- Hyperventilation
- Anxiety
- Depression
- Age-diminished visual, balance, and perception of spatial orientation abilities
- Stroke; cause of isolated dizziness in 0.7% of people who present to the emergency department
- Post-concussion syndrome

== Disequilibrium ==
In medicine, disequilibrium refers to impaired equilibrioception that can be characterised as a sensation of impending fall or of the need to obtain external assistance for proper locomotion. It is sometimes described as a feeling of improper tilt of the floor, or as a sense of floating. This sensation can originate in the inner ear or other motion sensors, or in the central nervous system. Neurologic disorders tend to cause constant vertigo or disequilibrium and usually have other symptoms of neurologic dysfunction associated with the vertigo. Many medications used to treat seizures, depression, anxiety, and pain affect the vestibular system and the central nervous system which can cause the symptom of disequilibrium.

== See also ==
- Balance disorder
- Broken escalator phenomenon
- Persistent postural-perceptual dizziness
- Coriolis effect (perception)
- Equilibrioception
- Ideomotor phenomenon
- Illusions of self-motion
- Motion sickness
- Postural orthostatic tachycardia syndrome
- Proprioception
- Persistent postural-perceptual dizziness
- Seasickness
- Spatial disorientation
- The spins, a state of dizziness and disorientation due to intoxication
- Vertigo
