= Persistent postural-perceptual dizziness =

- Specialty: Otorhinolaryngology, neurology

Persistent postural-perceptual dizziness (PPPD) is a type of dizziness that is not easily categorized into one of several other types, and for which the physical examination is typically normal. Patients with PPPD frequently initially suffer a sudden injury of some sort to their vestibular system, the neurologic network that preserves sense of balance. Even after this initial injury has healed, people with PPPD usually describe a vague sense of unsteadiness worsened by stress, emotional distress, or triggers in their environment. There is a clear indication that anxiety and other mental illnesses play a role in the dizziness symptoms that occur with PPPD. However, the condition is categorized as a chronic functional vestibular disorder where a shift has taken place in the way the central nervous system integrates sensory information.

Persistent postural-perceptual dizziness now unifies key features of a variety of chronic subjective dizziness (CSD) and has been codified into the International Classification of Diseases (ICD-11).

PPPD is estimated to be one of the more common causes of chronic or persistent dizziness at an incidence of 15–20%.

== Signs and symptoms ==
Symptoms can include:

- A constant sense of unsteadiness, rocking or swaying, dizziness or lightheadedness
- Disequilibrium on most days for at least 3 months
- Spatial orientation problems
- Off-kilter sensation
- Extreme sensitivity to movement and/or complex visual stimuli such as grocery stores or driving in the rain
- Worsening dizziness with experience of complex visual environments such as walking through a grocery store
- Heavy-headedness or a feeling of floating

Symptoms of CSD can be worsened by any self-precipitated motion, usually from the head, or the witnessing of motion from another subject. These are usually less noticeable when the person is lying still.

== Diagnosis ==
Diagnosis of PPPD often occurs after other medical conditions have been ruled out, or after an acute vertiginous event has resolved, but dizziness persists. A summary of diagnosis is "persistent nonvertiginous dizziness or unsteadiness that has lasted 3 months or more that is exacerbated when exposed to sudden moving/complex visual stimuli or during active/passive head motions, particularly when in upright that typically follows a balance-related problem." Key features also include difficulty discussing the quality of dizziness as well as associations with fear, worry, and catastrophizing especially as relates to specific environmental or task-provoked triggers.

One study found that 60% of PPPD patients had clinically significant anxiety and 45% had clinically significant depression, while 25% had no psychiatric condition.

Specific diagnostic criteria proposed by Staab and summarized by Holmberg include:

- Primary Symptoms: Dizziness or nonspinning vertigo (vague, often hard for patient to express): rocking, swaying, bobbing, bouncing, cloudiness, fuzziness, fullness, heaviness, lightheadedness, visual focus not clear, and orientation not sharp
- Unsteadiness: vague instability, wobbling, and feelings of veering without directional preponderance (no specific direction)
- Duration: at least 3 months
- Tempo: Persistent, prolonged (hours), without specific provocation; Mild wax/wane qualities can be noted (often accumulation of provoking factors); Present on most days (at least > 50%, but often 24 × 7)
- Context-specific provoking factors: Exposures to complex visual motion demands or environments; Active–passive head motion without directional preponderance; most severe when walking/standing, that is, upright posture versus less, absent, or very minor supine
- Onset: Sudden/distinct triggering or precipitant event that causes vertigo, unsteadiness, dizziness; may be structural ( with acute/episodic/chronic vestibular syndromes, migraine, or postconcussion syndrome) or psychiatric (anxiety, panic, or stress)
- Disabling: Significant distress and/or definable functional impairment, that is, changed activities of daily living
- Symptoms not better accounted or attributed to ongoing neuro-otologic disease/disorder or disease/disorder cannot fully explain all symptoms and/or level of disability; Normal physical exam, vestibular laboratory testing, and/or magnetic resonance imaging.

== Treatment ==
Effective treatment includes a combination of therapies, including vestibular rehabilitation therapy, medications such as SSRIs or buspirone (evidence for buspirone comes from one trial in functional dizziness that did not use PPPD criteria), and psychotherapy, cognitive behavioral therapy and acceptance and commitment therapy. Home-based therapies have shown comparable results to hospital-based therapies. Explaining the nature of the disorder to patients, including written information, is considered an important part of treatment.

Recent experiments with transcranial direct-current stimulation combined with vestibular rehabilitation showed significant improvement in symptoms of patients over a sham group in an exploratory study. A separate study showed non-invasive vagus nerve stimulation offered significant effect in PPPD patients regarding quality of life, postural balance control, attack severity and depression level, with no reported serious side effects, and suggest the need for further research.

== History ==
Perhaps the first account of CSD was the German neurologist Karl Westphal's portrayal in the late 1800s of people who suffered dizziness, anxiety and spatial disorientation when shopping in town squares. This phenomenon was called "agoraphobia", meaning a fear of the marketplace. The term is now used to describe a psychological fear, but Westphal's original description included many symptoms of dizziness and imbalance not included in the modern psychiatric definition. Unlike people who feel anxious in crowds because they feel something bad will happen, people with CSD may dislike crowds because all the movement leads to a sensation of dizziness.

The diagnostic terms for this disorder illustrate its more recent history. These include "space motion discomfort," "phobic postural vertigo," "psychogenic dizziness," "chronic subjective dizziness," and "psycho-physiological dizziness." As of January, 2025, the condition is recognized as "Persistent Postural-Perceptual Dizziness" by the International Classification of Diseases 11th Revision as code AB32.0.

Clinical studies are ongoing into PPPD at the Mayo Clinic and other institutions.
