= Highlands and Islands Airports =

Scottish air transport company

Highlands and Islands Airports Ltd.
- Type: Private limited company
- Industry: Transport
- Founded: 1986
- Headquarters: Inverness, Scotland, UK
- Key people: Chief Executive Officer - Paul Kelsall
- Products: Airport operations and services
- Owner: Scottish Government
- Website: www.hial.co.uk

Highlands and Islands Airports Limited (HIAL) (Scottish Gaelic: Puirt-adhair na Gàidhealtachd is nan Eilean Earranta) is a company based at Inverness Airport that owns and operates 11 airports in the Scottish Highlands, the Northern Isles and the Western Isles.

It is a private limited company wholly owned by the Scottish Government, and is categorised as Executive Non Departmental Public Body (ENDPB) of the Scottish Government.

== History ==
Highlands and Islands Airports Limited was incorporated on 4 March 1986 by the Civil Aviation Authority. In 1995, ownership transferred from the CAA to the Secretary of State for Scotland, and to the Scottish Ministers upon devolution.

The company was criticised for a PFI deal signed to build a new terminal at Inverness Airport, which meant that HIAL had to pay £3.50 to the PFI operator for every passenger flying from the airport. In 2006, the PFI deal was cancelled, costing the Scottish Executive £27.5m.

== Funding ==
It receives subsidies from public funds under terms of the Civil Aviation Act 1982. For the year ending 31 March 2018, HIAL received £29.2 million of public money, of £20.6m was classed as revenue subsidy, and £8.6m was capital investment.

== Airports ==
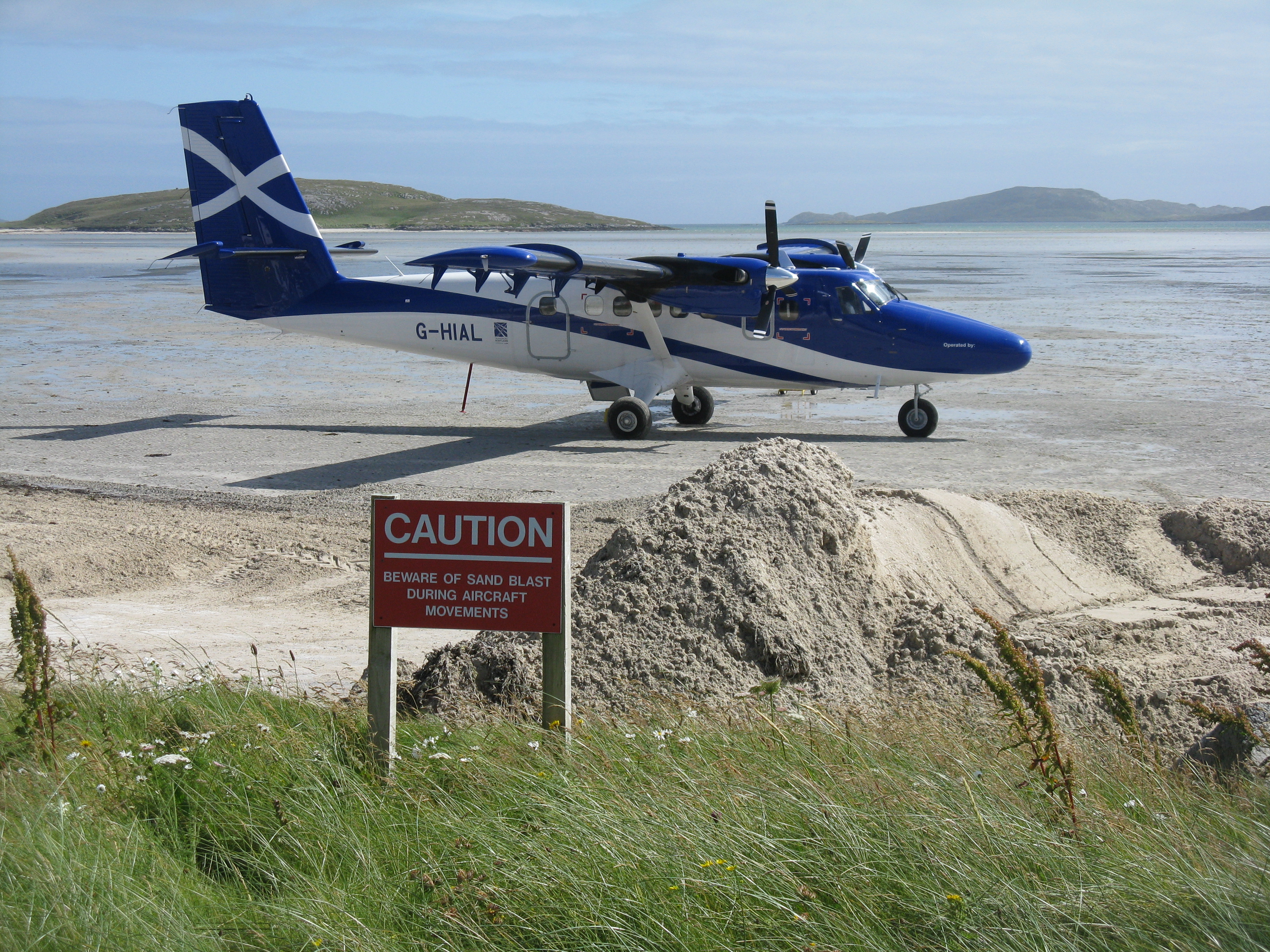
PSO-operated G-HIAL on sand at Barra Airport

HIAL operates the following airports:

- Barra Airport
- Benbecula Airport
- Campbeltown Airport
- Dundee Airport
- Inverness Airport
- Islay Airport
- Kirkwall Airport
- Stornoway Airport
- Sumburgh Airport
- Tiree Airport
- Wick Airport
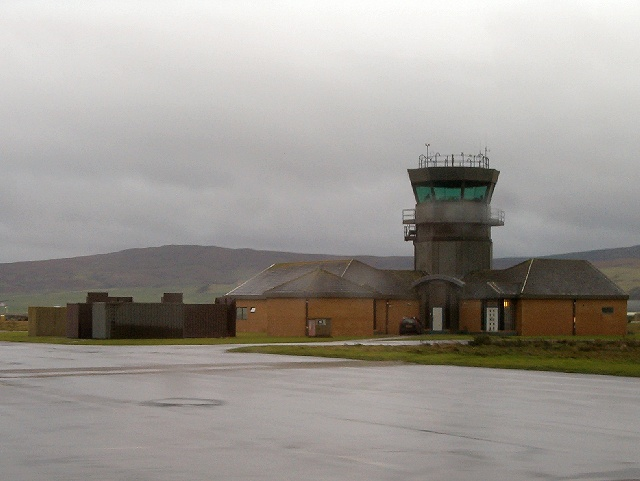
  Air Traffic Control tower at Campbeltown Airport
