= Dundee Airport =

Airport in Dundee, Scotland

Dundee Airport Port-adhair Dhùn Dè (Gaelic)

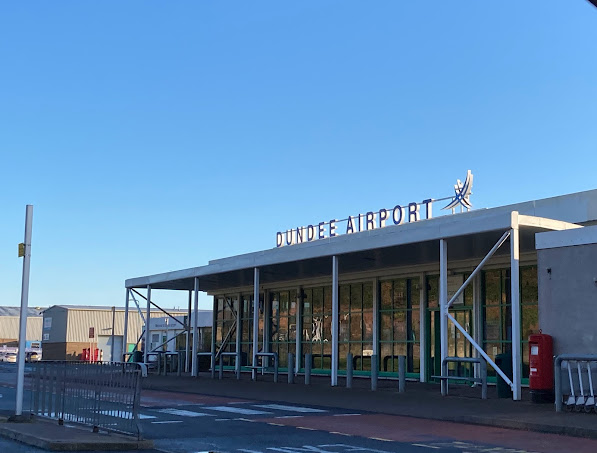
- IATA: DND; ICAO: EGPN

Summary
- Airport type: Public
- Owner: Dundee City Council
- Operator: Highlands and Islands Airports
- Location: Dundee, Scotland, UK
- Elevation AMSL: 17 ft (5.2 m)
- Coordinates: 56°27′09″N 003°01′33″W
- Website: www.hial.co.uk/dundee-airport/

Map
- Location in Dundee

Runways
Direction	Length		Surface
Direction	m	ft	Surface
09/27	1,400	4,593	Asphalt

Statistics (2025)
- Passengers: 33,068
- Passenger change 2024-25: ▼8.3%
- Aircraft Movements: 1,447
- Movements change 2024-25: ▼3.0%
- Sources: UK AIP at NATS; Statistics: UK Civil Aviation Authority

Dundee Airport (Scottish Gaelic: Port-adhair Dhùn Dè) (IATA: DND, ICAO: EGPN) is an airport adjacent to the Firth of Tay in Dundee, Scotland. As of October 2026, the airport, which is operated by Highlands and Islands Airports, has no scheduled services.

The airport is used by business aviation and charter traffic, particularly during golf tournaments, owing to its close proximity to the championship courses at St Andrews, Gleneagles and Carnoustie.

== History ==
The airport was opened in 1963 on land reclaimed from the Firth of Tay. Originally it had a 900 m (2,953 ft) grass runway. The first scheduled air service began on 5 July 1966, with a service to Glasgow. A fortnight later a feeder service was added for Edinburgh and Prestwick. The service was stopped on 31 October 1967 after British Eagle reported £10,000 losses. Around this time the control of Dundee City Council changed from Labour to Conservative, and the airport was closed and the land used by Dundee University as playing fields. When control of the Council changed back again to Labour the airport was reopened.

The grass runway was replaced by a 1,100 m (3,609 ft) long tarmac runway in the 1970s, and extended to the current length of 1,400 m (4,593 ft) in the 1990s. The airport was granted "customs airport" status on 16 April 1982 and runway edge lights were added in 1983. The current terminal was opened in 1997 by the then EU transport commissioner Neil Kinnock.

The Dundee to London City route was flown by Dornier 328 aircraft leased from ScotAirways, until January 2011 when ScotAirways near 12-year association with the route came to an end, as CityJet announced the route would be operated on a reduced frequency by its own Fokker 50 aircraft. This change caused concern within the business community for the continued viability of the route. However following the purchase of ScotAirways by Loganair in July 2011, the Dornier 328 was reinstated on the London City route.

On 29 May 2007, services to Birmingham and Belfast City operated by FlyWhoosh, using ATR 42 aircraft, started. The company, which was effectively only a ticket agent, used the services of a Polish airline White Eagle Aviation (WEA), which based an aircraft at Dundee Airport. In December 2007 these services ceased, amid some confusion as to what exactly caused the termination of services.

On 3 March 2008, Loganair announced that it would recommence the routes that had been operated by FlyWhoosh in May 2008, under the new Flybe franchise. Three weekday return flights were introduced between Dundee and Birmingham, with one return flight on Sundays and a daily weekday return flight between Dundee and Belfast City Airport, with one return flight also operating on Sundays. The company used Saab 340 aircraft on these routes.

=== Loganair ===
In September 2017, Loganair became an independent airline operating in its own right. Experts said this would give the airline more freedom to operate more flights, and speculated that Dundee would figure among these additional flights. As of February 2024 the airline operated to London Heathrow, Kirkwall and Sumburgh airports, using an ATR 42-500 with capacity of 48 seats.

In August 2026, Loganair announced that it would end all services on 23 October 2026.

=== Tayside Aviation ===
Until it ceased trading on 20 April 2023, Tayside Aviation operated a training facility and engineering workshop at the airport. This was supplemented by a maintenance hangar built in 1982. Their operations formed the substantial part of the light aircraft movements at the airport, being, among other things, sole contractor to the Air Cadet Organisation to provide Light Aircraft Flying Scholarships to RAF cadets.

=== Dundee City Council and HIAL ===
Dundee Airport had been operating at a loss of over £2 million per year from 2004 to 2007 and in the first full financial year of operation under HIAL, 2008/9, the airport's loss was £2.6 million.

On 12 February 2007 it was announced that, from September 2007, the City Council would hand over the running of the airport to Highlands and Islands Airports Limited (HIAL), while retaining ownership of it. The takeover took place on 1 December 2007.

Any additional scheduled flights at the airport would be limited by runway length to regional aircraft. Larger aircraft used by low-cost airlines, such as Boeing 737s, require longer runways. The largest aircraft that can land at the airport are the BAe 146 and the Airbus A318.

=== Flybe controversy ===
On 8 August 2008, HIAL and airport executives announced that they were considering a direct air link to Amsterdam. In late October 2008, an article was placed in the Evening Telegraph concerning the possibility of flights to and from Spain. The airport operator had also stated that the Airbus A318 was fully compatible for Dundee Airport and could be used to operate these flights.

In 2016, Flybe announced Dundee's first direct international flight to Amsterdam, which started on 23 May 2016 and was operated with a 78-seater Bombardier Dash 8 Q400 aircraft. The initial 5-weekly return flight was funded through the regional connectivity fund, operating through the Department for Transport's public service obligation scheme. On 19 November, Flybe suspended the route as part of a review of the airline's operations at Dundee Airport. All passengers booked on the route were transported to Edinburgh Airport and rebooked on a flight from Edinburgh to Amsterdam. The suspension was due to be lifted on 16 December; however, this did not materialise. It was announced on 23 December 2016 that the flights to Amsterdam would be cut in 2017, as Flybe believed that the radar coverage was not adequate. Flybe stated that it would return to Dundee only when an improved radar system was installed. While it is unlikely that an improved Secondary Surveillance Radar system will be installed, newer lower-cost technologies such as Multilateration and ADS-B are being investigated.

== Statistics ==
Traffic Statistics for Dundee Airport
Year	Passengers Handled (Note: per CAA Table 9; Terminal and Transit Passengers)	Passenger Change %	Air Transport Movements (Note: per CAA Table 4.1 Air Transport Movements by Type and Nationality of Operator)	Movements Change %	Notes
2015	21,973	Steady	1,174	Steady	
2016	37,647	▲71.3%	1,465	▲24.8%	
2017	21,327	▼43.4%	1,174	▼19.9%	
2018	21,185	▼0.7%	1,215	▲3.5%	
2019	20,917	▼1.3%	1,212	▼0.2%	
2020	8,647	▼58.7%	730	▼39.8%	(Note: Scheduled flights were suspended for periods throughout 2020 due to the COVID-19 pandemic, therefore resulting in significantly reduced passenger numbers for the year.)
2021	19,658	▲127.3%	995	▲36.3%	
2022	38,451	▲95.6%	1,458	▲46.5%	
2023	38,508	▲0.1%	1,655	▲13.5%	
2024	36,071	▼6.3%	1,491	▼9.9%	
2025	33,068	▼8.3%	1,447	▼3.0%	

== Perth Airport incursion ==
While Perth Airport is 7.5 nautical miles (8.6 mi; 13.9 km) away to the west, Dundee's category C instrument approach encroaches its aerodrome traffic zone (ATZ) at 1,800 ft (550 m) above aerodrome elevation (AAL). This procedure is used by Dundee commercial and training traffic irrespective of the runway in use. In an easterly wind, traffic may go as far west as the Perth overhead.

== Ground transport ==
=== Road ===
The airport lies on the main A85 Riverside Drive, which links the city centre to the Kingsway and the A90, with the airport approximately 2 miles (3.2 km) from the city centre itself. Taxis are available from outside the airport.

=== Bus ===
Dundee Airport is a short taxi ride from the main Dundee bus station. Direct buses to many other major destinations are available from the station. Chartered buses can also be booked with local operators.

=== Rail ===
The airport is also a short drive from Dundee railway station. The station is situated on the East Coast Main Line to Aberdeen, Edinburgh and London, and is also on the Glasgow–Aberdeen line serving Glasgow and further afield. Dundee station is served by ScotRail, London North Eastern Railway, the Caledonian Sleeper and CrossCountry.

== Accidents and incidents ==
- On 24 October 2003, a U.S.-registered six-seater TBM 700 came down 200 m (660 ft) short of the runway in the Tay Estuary. The hovercraft was deployed and the occupants were rescued from the aircraft in around 15 minutes. The four people on board received only minor injuries.
- On 6 June 2005, an instructor and trainee escaped uninjured when a Grob G 115 crashed through a fence at Dundee Airport after the novice got into difficulties. The plane was extensively damaged in the accident.
- On 3 May 2015, two men died in a Beech Baron aircraft near Abernyte, Scotland which was due to land at Dundee Airport at midday. The wreckage was found at about 16:00. The plane was thought to have been travelling from Inverness to Dundee, which is a base for light aircraft.
