= Flybmi =

Regional airline of the United Kingdom (1987–2019)

flybmi

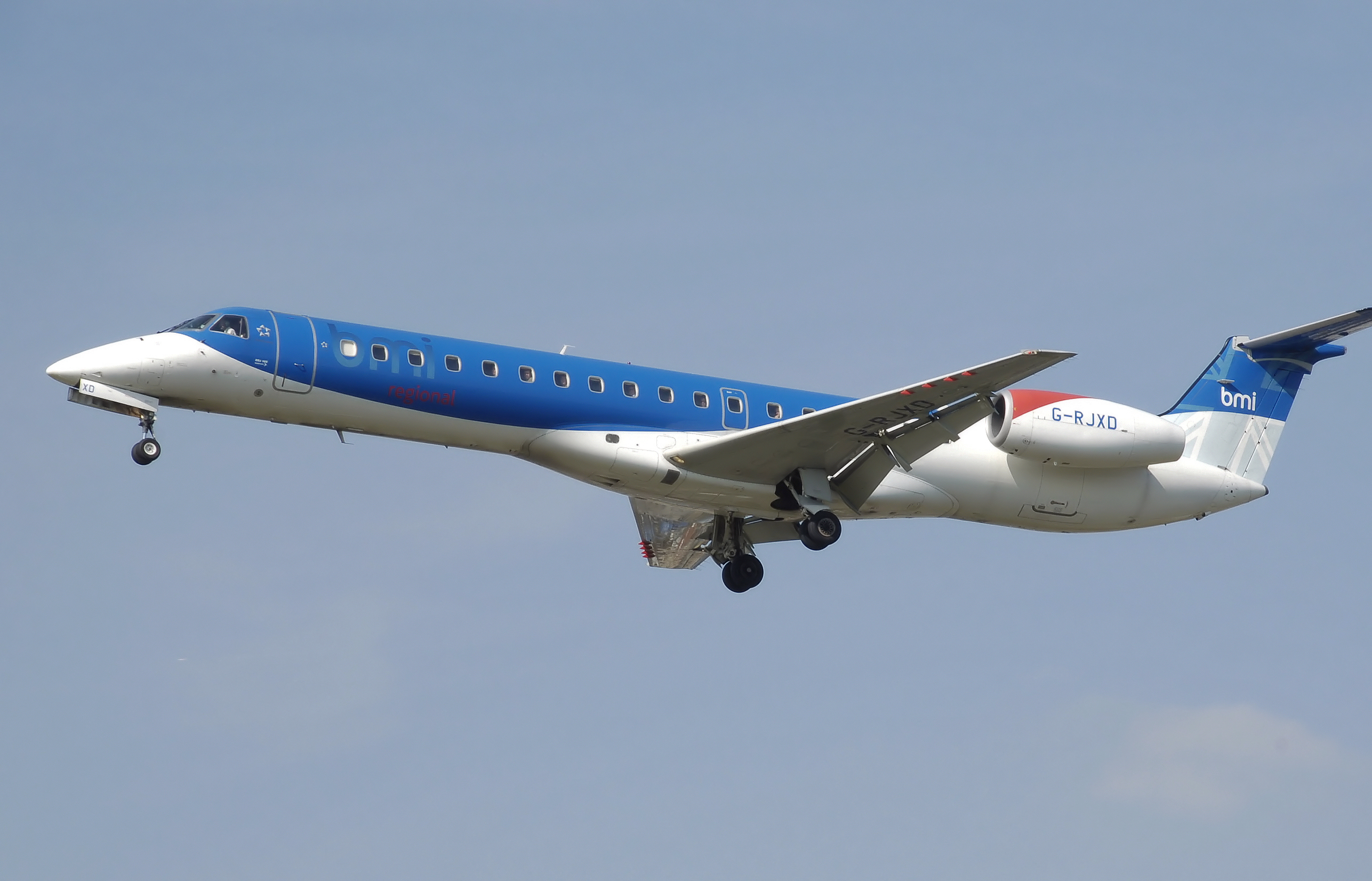
- Embraer ERJ 145 in 2007
IATA	ICAO	Call sign
II (1987–1998); BD (1998–2001); BM (2001–2019)	GNT (1987–2001); BMR (2001–2019)	GRANITE (1987–2001); KITTIWAKE (2001–2012); MIDLAND (2012–2019)
- Founded: September 1987 (as Business Air)
- Commenced operations: 7 April 1988
- Ceased operations: 16 February 2019
- Operating bases: Aberdeen; Bristol; Brussels; Derry; East Midlands; Edinburgh; Glasgow; Karlstad; Leeds/Bradford; Manchester; Munich; Newcastle upon Tyne
- Frequent-flyer program: BMI Diamond Club
- Alliance: Star Alliance (affiliate; 2000–2012)
- Parent company: British Midland International (1996–2012); Sector Aviation Holdings (2012–2015); Airline Investments Limited (2015–2019)
- Headquarters: East Midlands Airport
- Key people: Stephen Bond (Chairman); Peter Simpson (CEO)

Flybmi, styled as flybmi from 2018, legally British Midland Regional Ltd. 2001 and branded as bmi Regional (2001-2018), was a regional airline in the United Kingdom that operated scheduled passenger services across the UK and Europe. The head office of the airline was at East Midlands Airport in North West Leicestershire, and it had operating bases at Aberdeen, Brussels, Bristol, East Midlands, Newcastle and Munich.

Flybmi was a former subsidiary of British Midland International (BMI), which was purchased from Lufthansa by International Airlines Group (IAG) on 20 April 2012. Regional was sold to Sector Aviation Holdings in May 2012 and operated as an independent airline from October 2012. In August 2015, the airline became part of a new regional airline group, Airline Investments Limited (AIL), along with Loganair.

Flybmi ceased operations and filed for administration on 16 February 2019.

== History ==
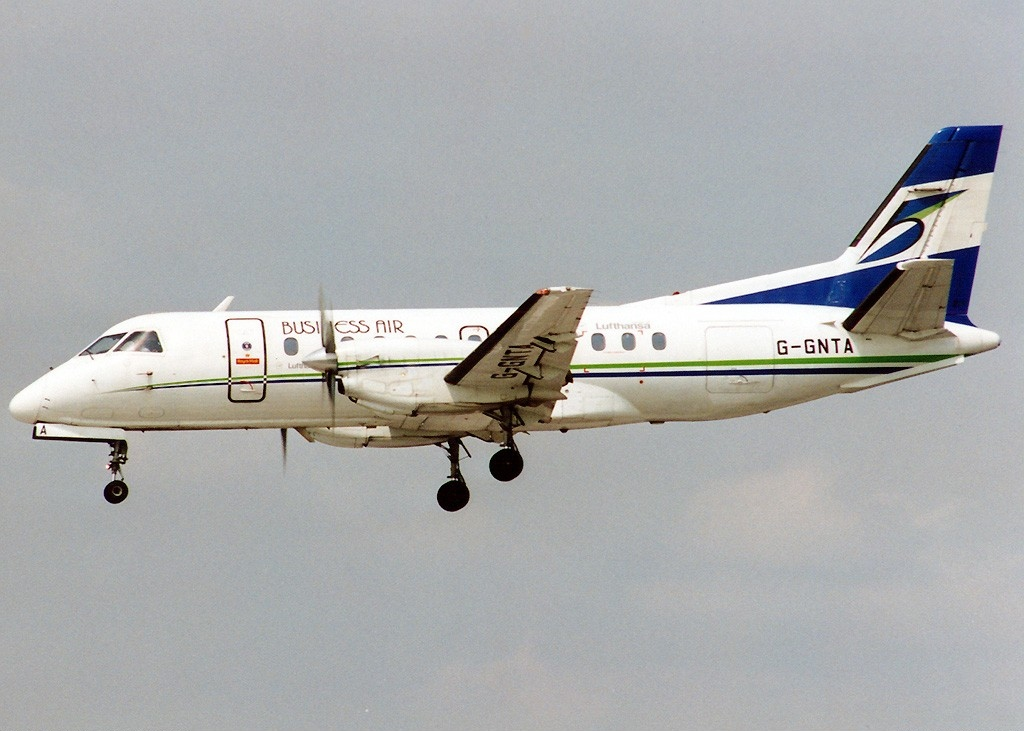
A Business Air Saab 340.

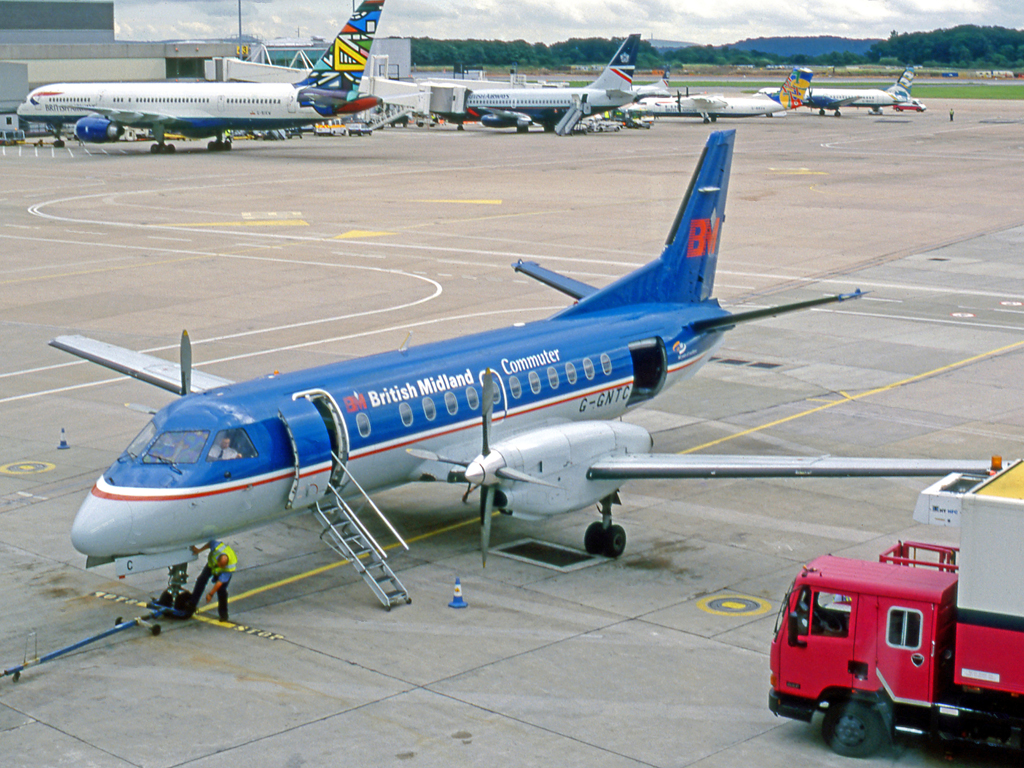
Saab 340 of British Midland Commuter at Manchester Airport in July 1998.

The airline was established in September 1987 as Business Air Ltd. It was the result of the merger between Business Air Centre and Euroair Scotland-based operations. It started irregular flights in August 1987 and schedules on 7 April 1988 with Saab 340. In 1996 Business Air was purchased by British Midland's parent Airlines of Britain and the operational integration happened two years later. The airline adopted the brand British Midland Commuter in December 1998. It operated feeder services for British Midland into Manchester Airport with a fleet of Saab 340 turboprops.

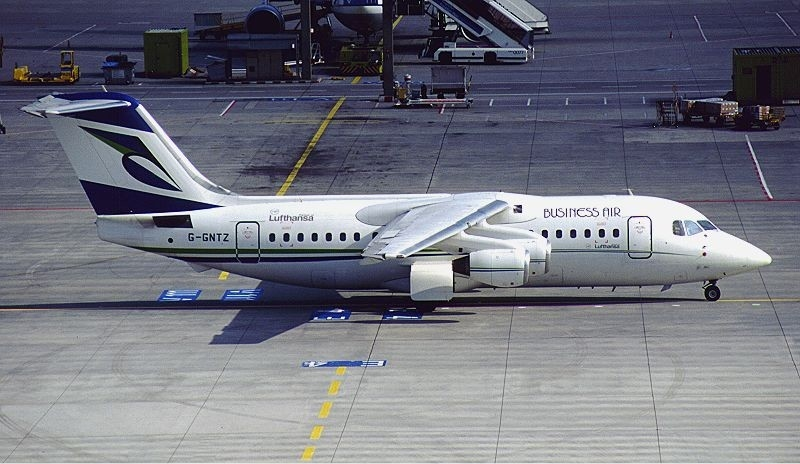
BAe 146-300

Following the collapse of Debonair in 1999, the air carrier was awarded the contract to operate five BAe 146 aircraft on a wet lease basis for Lufthansa CityLine.

On 21 May 2001, parent company British Midland renamed the subsidiary British Midland Regional Ltd. with the brand bmi regional. As a subsidiary of BMI, the regional company was owned by Michael Bishop (50%), Lufthansa (30%) and Scandinavian Airlines (20%). Lufthansa purchased Michael Bishop's and SAS' stakes in October 2009, taking full ownership of the airline group. A restructuring of the group was announced the following month, which also affected regional's operations. A suspension of loss-making routes and capacity adjustments within the group resulted in the airline having a surplus of three Embraer aircraft in 2010, and the company began consultations with staff over possible job losses. The excess aircraft were leased to other carriers.

The airline was acquired by Sector Aviation Holdings, a company predominantly owned and funded by Stephen and Peter Bond, whose family sold helicopter operator Bond Aviation Group in 2010. Sector Aviation Holdings also included the founders of Business Air, Ian Woodley and Graeme Ross. The sale was announced on 1 June 2012.

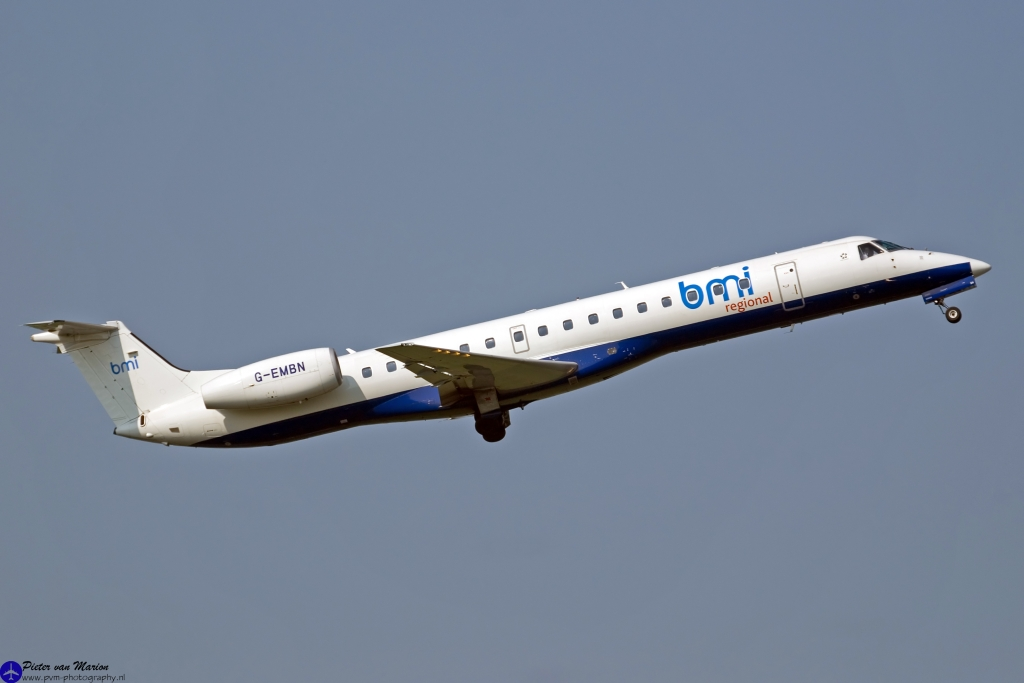
Embraer ERJ 145

In 2014 bmi regional was named the most punctual scheduled airline in the UK for the ninth consecutive year. Based on Civil Aviation Authority statistics, the airline achieved an on-time performance of over 92% in 2013.

On 5 July 2018, bmi regional rebranded to flybmi.

On the evening of 16 February 2019, flybmi announced it was to go into administration and would cease operations immediately. All flights were cancelled. In the following days, Loganair (also owned by AIL), announced that it was to take over several of Flybmi's routes from Aberdeen and Newcastle. Ryanair offered rescue fares for stranded customers on some routes and also sought to recruit former flybmi personnel.

== Corporate affairs ==
=== Offices ===
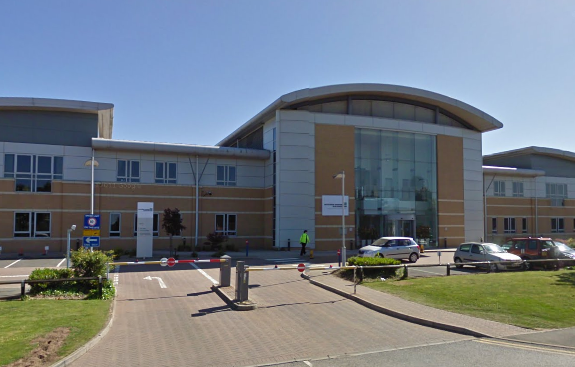
Head office of Flybmi at East Midlands Airport

At the end of its existence the head office was at Pegasus Business Park on the grounds of East Midlands Airport in Castle Donington.

Since being founded as Business Air, the company had always had its Operations Control Centre located at Aberdeen. The occupied building was shared with CHC Helicopter which utilises the hangar space for helicopter maintenance and storage for its North Sea fleet. Aircraft maintenance is still carried out at the shared hangar, however all other functions have been moved elsewhere.

Following the purchase of Regional in May 2012, Sector Aviation Holdings took the decision to relocate the company headquarters from Aberdeen to Pegasus Business Park, on the grounds of East Midlands Airport. Whilst a subsidiary, some head office functions were provided by British Midland International at its head office in Donington Hall, Castle Donington.

The registered office was in the Lightyear Building at Glasgow Airport in Paisley, Renfrewshire, Scotland. Previously the registered office was at Aberdeen Airport East in Dyce, Aberdeen, Scotland.

=== Operations ===
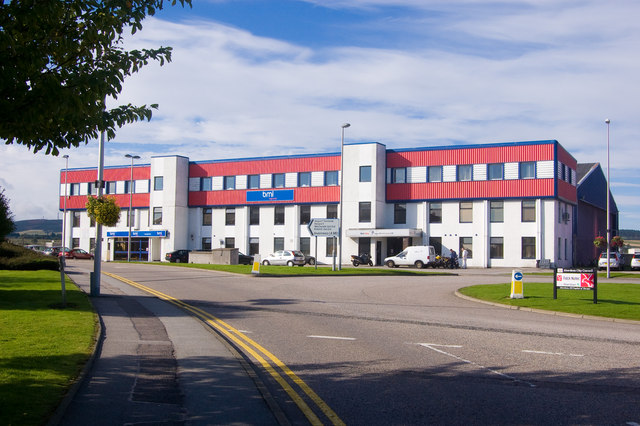
Previous operations office at Aberdeen Airport

British Midland Regional Limited held a Civil Aviation Authority Type A Operating Licence, permitting it to carry passengers, cargo and mail on aircraft with 20 or more seats.

After becoming an independent airline, Flybmi changed its callsign from "Kittiwake" to "Midland" and on 28 October 2012 announced that it would be using "BM" as the company IATA airline designator in place of the previously used "BD" which belonged to British Midland International.

The airline's three main operating bases were Aberdeen Airport and Bristol Airport in the UK, as well as Munich Airport in Germany. On 23 January 2014, Flybmi launched a new domestic operation in Norway with an aircraft based in Stavanger. This new service provided the first scheduled direct air link between Harstad/Narvik Airport, Evenes and Stavanger, however this service no longer operates.

Along with the operating bases at the time of closure, Flybmi previously had numerous bases throughout the United Kingdom with crew stationed at Edinburgh Airport, Glasgow Airport, Leeds Bradford Airport, Manchester Airport and London Heathrow Airport. All of these bases had regional routes operated from them along with routes on behalf of British Midland International (BMI), Heathrow which was solely mainline routes.

A base at Birmingham Airport opened during May 2013, but on 28 October 2013 it was announced that following a network review the base would close at the end of December 2013.

Using its Embraer 145 aircraft, Flybmi previously operated a number of shuttle services on behalf of aircraft manufacturer Airbus. These linked manufacturing sites at Broughton, Filton and Toulouse. Despite previously having crew based at Manchester Airport and no scheduled services operating from Chester Hawarden, Flybmi based crew at Hawarden for the Airbus shuttle flights.

Originally the Airbus shuttle operated to Filton Aerodrome but following its closure in December 2012, the shuttle operation transferred to Bristol Lulsgate in January 2013. This had no impact on crew as they were already based at Bristol. The contract for these corporate shuttle flights was won by Eastern Airways and as a result Flybmi ceased operating these flights in late 2015.

In early 2014, Flybmi commenced a contract to operate a further staff shuttle on behalf of helicopter manufacturer AgustaWestland. This shuttle was previously operated by Eastern Airways using an Embraer 135 between Milan Malpensa and RNAS Yeovilton. In 2015 Flybmi chose to operate the route from nearby Bristol Airport instead, thereby enabling them to carry commercial passengers on the route also, as well as upgrading the aircraft type.

In summer 2015 the airline based an Embraer 135 and an Embraer 145 at Munich to operate services to Bern, Liège and Rotterdam in conjunction with Lufthansa and replacing Lufthansa CityLine. This followed the signing of a code-share agreement with Lufthansa in April 2014. During 2015 the service to Liège was cancelled, while a new service to Brno commenced. In early 2016 a further Embraer 145 aircraft was based in Munich in order to allow them to serve further routes from there bringing the total number to eight.

=== Business figures ===
Year	Total Passengers	Total Flights	Load Factor	Passenger Change YoY
1997	97,188	22,615	59.4%	
1998	231,083	23,395	56.7%	▲137.8%
1999	329,388	20,967	58.8%	▲42.5%
2000	402,607	28,603	60.3%	▲22.2%
2001	457,001	30,675	56.9%	▲13.5%
2002	571,837	25,561	57.3%	▲25.1%
2003	781,283	28,556	58.1%	▲36.6%
2004	716,461	26,696	55.3%	▼8.3%
2011	420,296	31,521	62.0%	N/a
2012	382,037	27,062	59.3%	▼9.1%
2013	447,975	20,543	49.1%	▲17.3%
2014	406,699	19,240	53.7%	▼9.2%
2015	412,656	23,310	54.6%	▲1.5%
2016	415,446	27,200	54.1%	▲0.7%
2017	540,315	29,832	57.1%	▲26.1%
2005 – 2010: Figures unavailable, only listed as "BMI Group" Source: UK Civil Aviation Authority

== Destinations ==
As a subsidiary of British Midland International, the airline operated regional services for its parent. After becoming independent of BMI, the airline completed an entire network review which resulted in numerous route and base closures along with the introduction of a number of new routes during 2012 and 2013.

Flybmi operated scheduled services to 23 scheduled destinations throughout continental Europe including Scandinavia and also United Kingdom. Commencing 30 March 2014, the start of the IATA Northern Summer Season 2014, the airline operated a scheduled service on behalf of Brussels Airlines between Brussels and Bristol. Previously, Flybmi also operated a scheduled service on behalf of Brussels Airlines between Brussels and Newcastle.

At the time of closure, Flybmi had codeshare agreements in place with other airlines. Flybmi operated codeshares with Lufthansa on its routes from Bristol to Frankfurt and on all of its routes to/from Munich. It also operated a codeshare with Brussels Airlines from both East Midlands Airport and Newcastle to Brussels.

Flybmi also operated regular holiday charter flights over the summer months. These destinations included Bastia on the island of Corsica on behalf of specialist tour operator Corsican Places, from Bristol, and Verona from Bristol on behalf of another specialist tour operator, Inghams. During 2011 Regional aircraft operated, on behalf of BMI, direct flights between Heathrow Airport and Beja in the Alentejo region of Portugal for Sunvil Discovery.

At the end of July 2016 the airline announced an extension to its codeshare agreement with Brussels Airlines by adding seven new routes to its network. This allowed Flybmi to sell fares to Heathrow Airport.

In 2017 Flybmi operated a short-lived twice-weekly service between Birmingham Airport and Graz, becoming the first and only direct link between the UK and Austria's second city.

=== Codeshare airlines ===
As of closure in February 2019, Flybmi codeshared with the following airlines:

- Air Dolomiti
- Air France
- Brussels Airlines
- Loganair
- Lufthansa
- Turkish Airlines

== Fleet ==
=== Fleet at closure ===
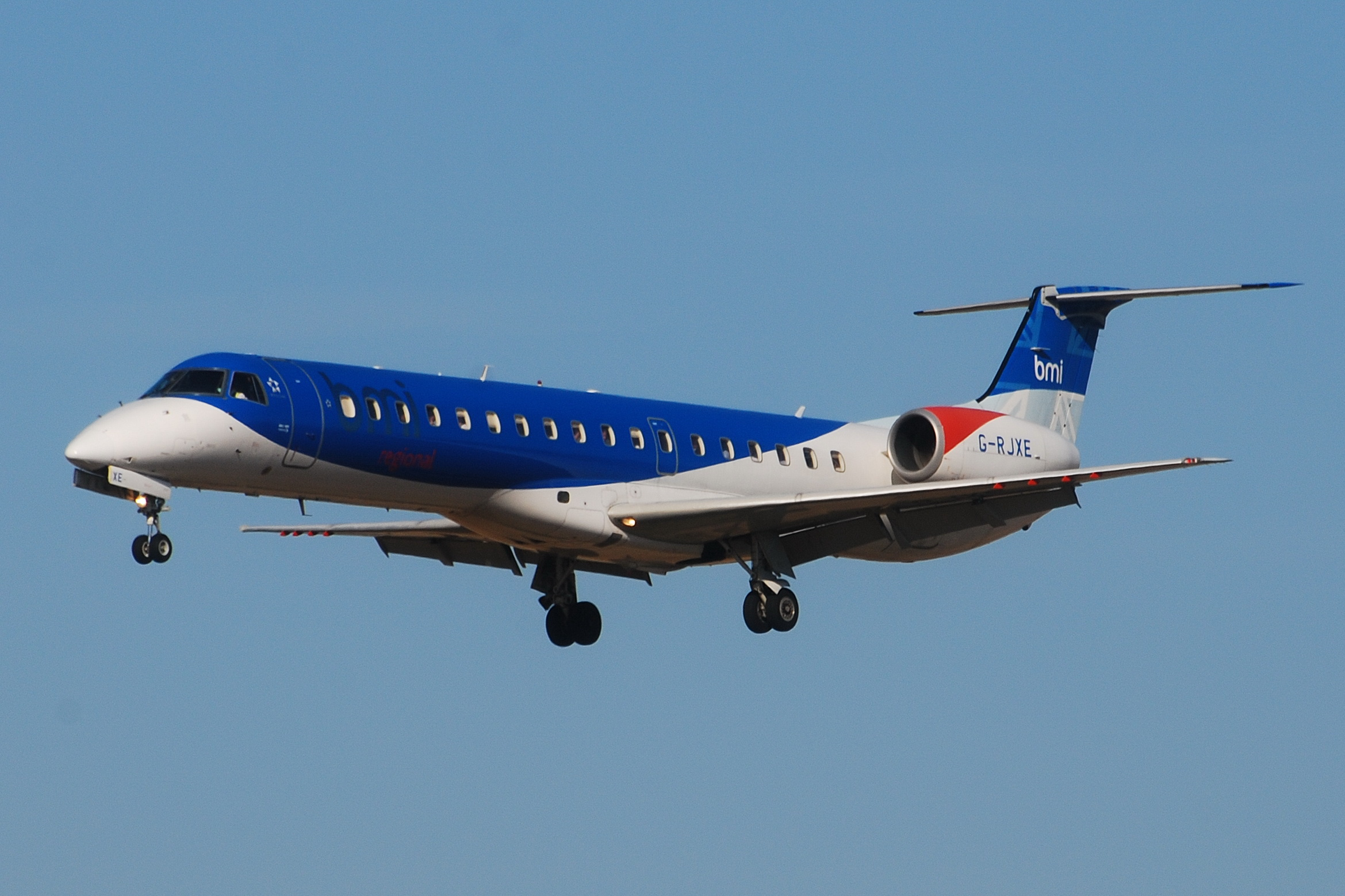
bmi Regional Embraer ERJ-145

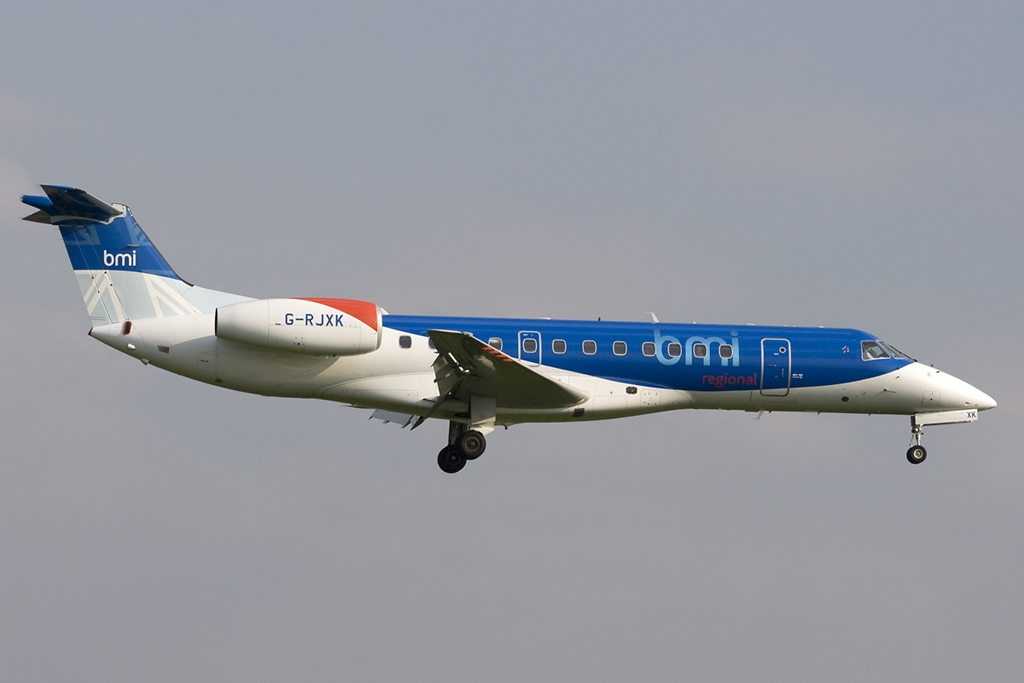
Flybmi Embraer ERJ-135

As of February 2019, the Flybmi fleet consisted of the following aircraft:

Flybmi fleet
Aircraft	Operated	Orders	Passengers	Notes
Embraer ERJ 135	3	—	37	
Embraer ERJ 145	14	—	49	1 aircraft was operated for Brussels Airlines
Total	17	—		

15 aircraft were transferred to sister airline Loganair in 2019, while the remaining two were placed into storage.

=== Planned future fleet ===
In May 2018 CCO Jochen Schnadt said in an interview with Air Transport World that the carrier was evaluating adding larger regional jets to the fleet with both the Bombardier CRJ900 and Embraer 190 being considered. In June 2018 it was announced that Flybmi would transfer two Embraer ERJ-145 to its sister company Loganair for the start of the S19 schedule.

=== Former fleet ===
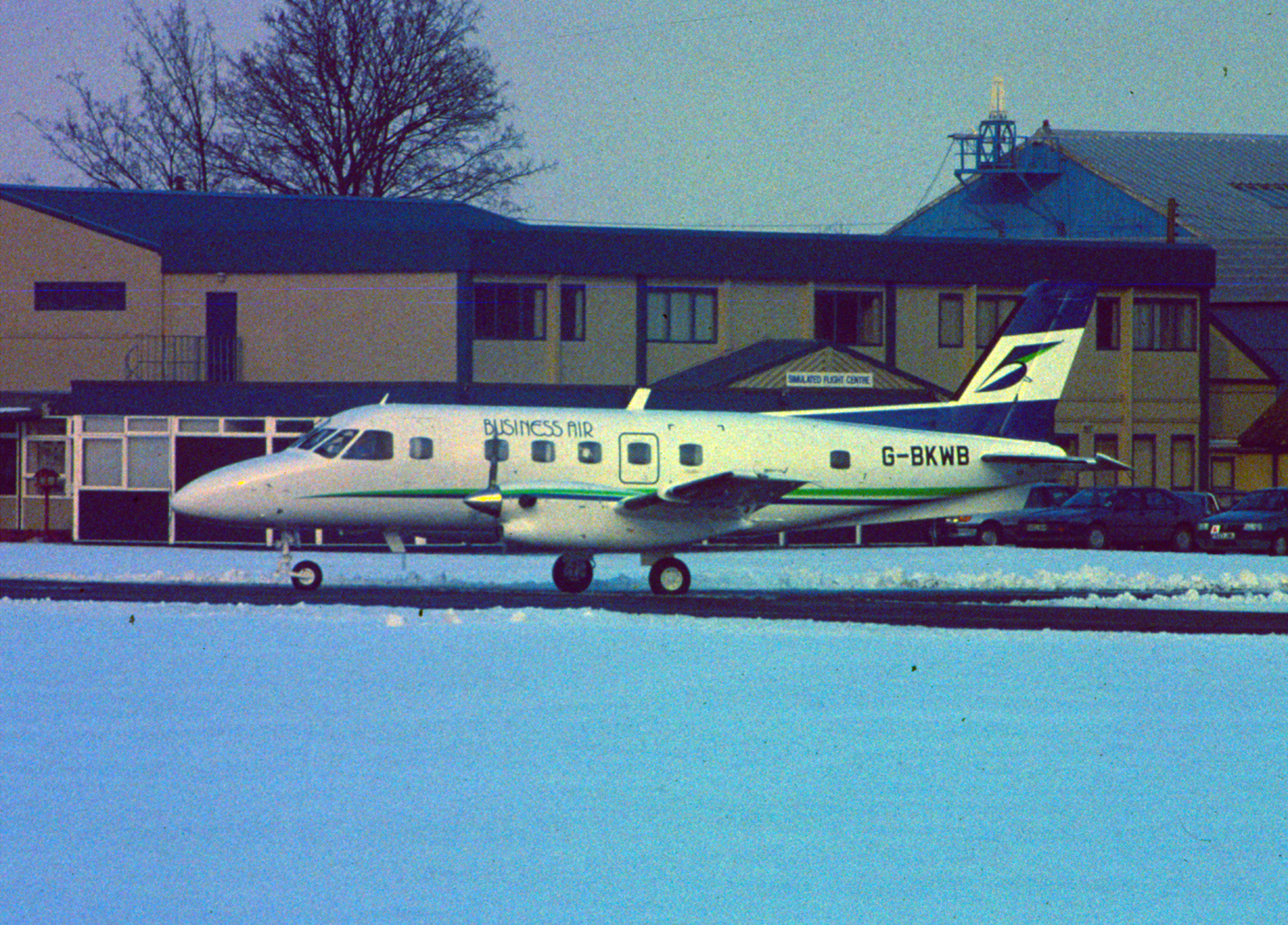
Embraer EMB 110 Bandeirante

Flybmi also operated the following aircraft during its existence:

- Embraer EMB 110 Bandeirante
- BAe 146-300
- Saab 340

== See also ==
- List of defunct airlines of the United Kingdom
