= Loganair =

Scottish airline

Loganair Limited

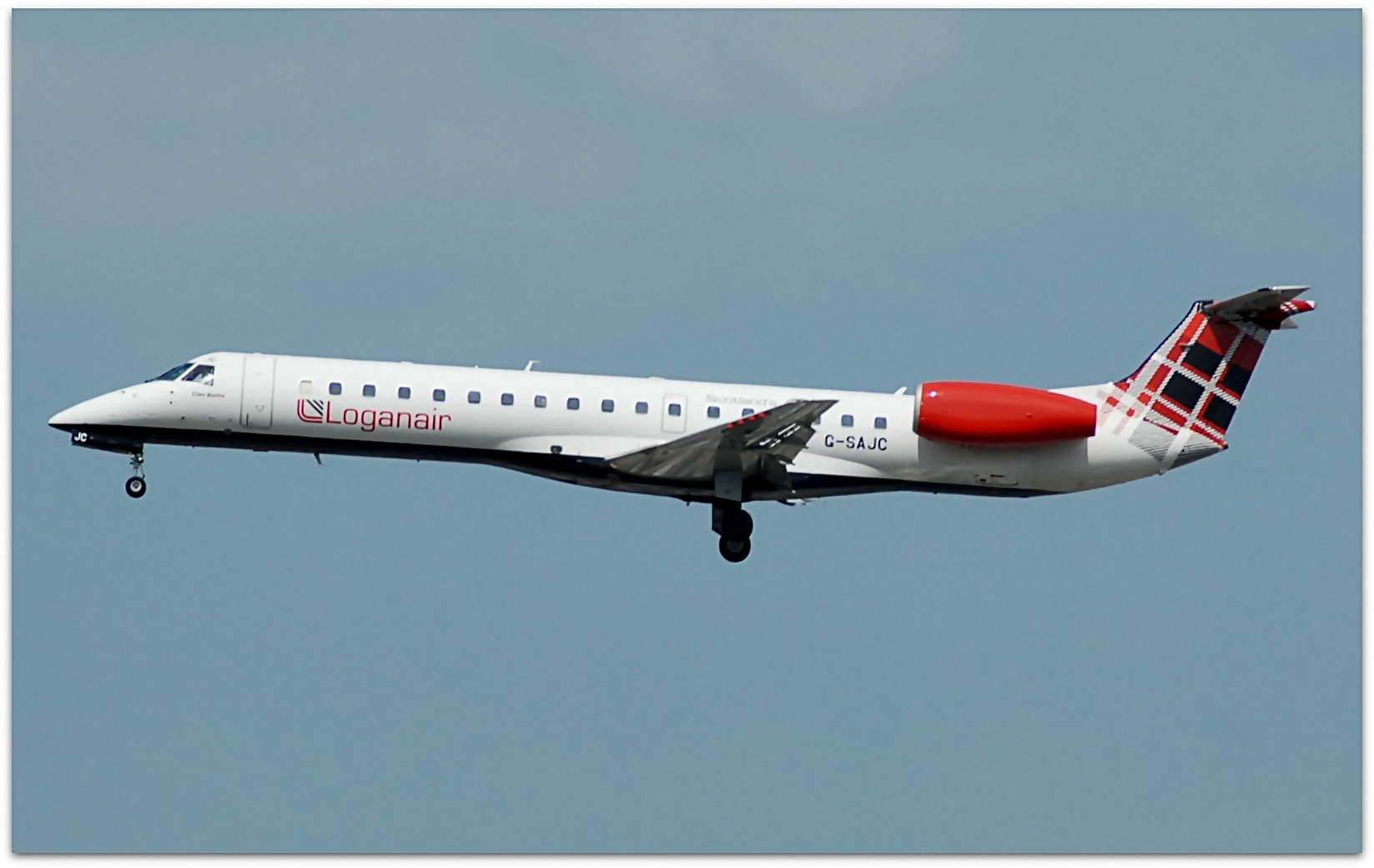
- Loganair Embraer E145
IATA	ICAO	Call sign
LM	LOG	LOGAN
- Founded: 1 February 1962; 64 years ago
- AOC #: 2105
- Operating bases: Aberdeen; Derry; Edinburgh; Glasgow; Inverness; Jersey; Kirkwall; Isle of Man
- Frequent-flyer program: Loganair Loyalty (Avios)
- Fleet size: 36
- Destinations: 43
- Parent company: Airline Investments Limited (AIL)
- Headquarters: Paisley, Renfrewshire, Scotland, UK
- Key people: Luke Farajallah (CEO) Natalie Bush (COO)
- Revenue: £161 million (2021)
- Profit: £4.98 million (2021)
- Employees: 886
- Website: www.loganair.co.uk

Loganair Limited is a Scottish regional airline headquartered at Glasgow Airport in Paisley, Renfrewshire, Scotland. Primarily operating domestic flights within the United Kingdom, the airline is the largest regional airline in the UK.

In addition to its main base at Glasgow, it has hubs at Aberdeen, Edinburgh and Inverness. It holds a United Kingdom Civil Aviation Authority Type A Operating Licence, permitting it to carry passengers, cargo and mail on aircraft with 20 or more seats.

== History ==
=== Early years ===
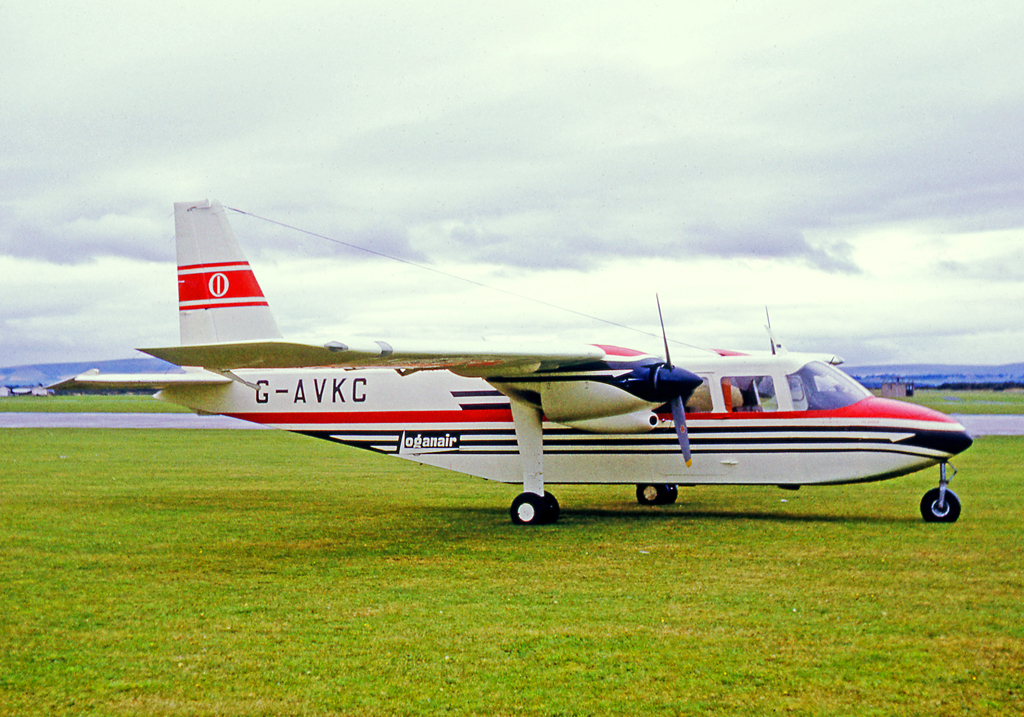
Loganair Britten-Norman Islander in 1967

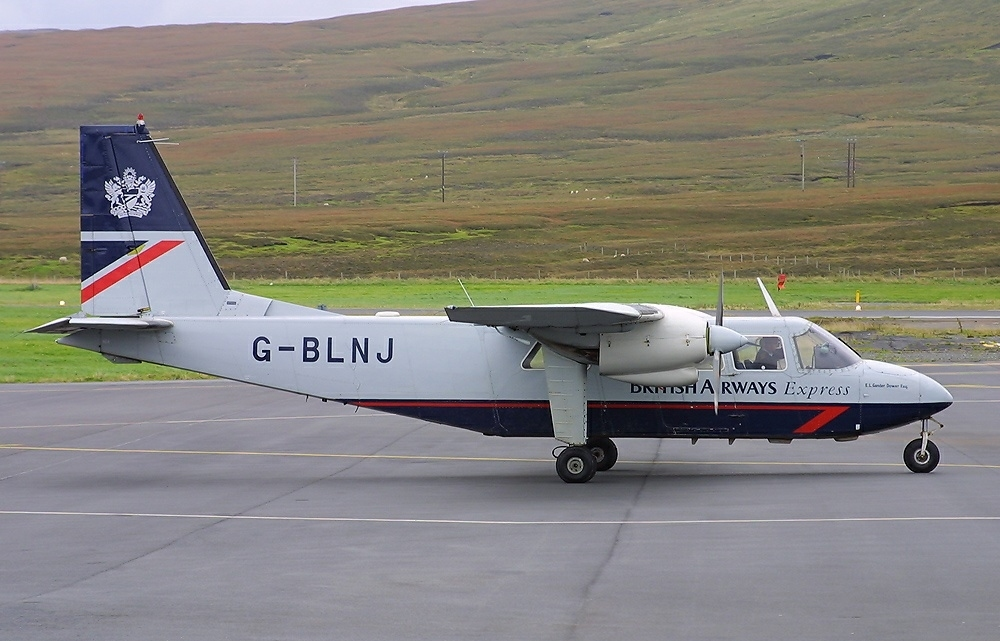
Loganair Britten-Norman Islander wearing British Airways Express titles in 2002

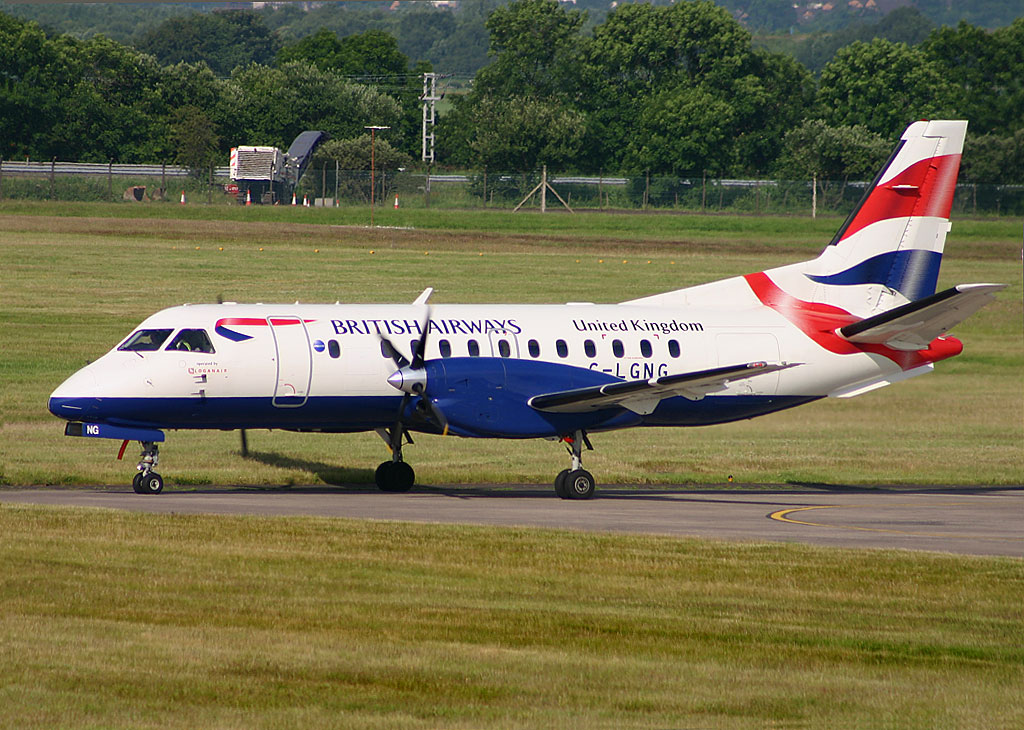
A former Loganair Saab 340B wearing the British Airways livery in 2006

Loganair was established on 1 February 1962 by Willie Logan of the Logan Construction Company Ltd, operating as its air charter arm with a Piper PA-23 Aztec based at Edinburgh.

In 1967, Loganair took delivery of three Britten-Norman Islander twin-engine eight-seat light commuter airliners and began regular flights between the Orkney Islands, and started operating in Shetland in 1970. In 1966, after Renfrew Airport closed, the airline established its head office at Glasgow Airport. This aspect of Loganair's operations ceased on 31 March 2006 when the new contract for air ambulance work was awarded to Gama Aviation.

Between 1968 and 1983, the company was owned by the Royal Bank of Scotland, Towards the end of this period, Loganair bought Short 360 and Fokker F27 Friendship aircraft. The company brought jet aircraft into the fleet with two British Aerospace 146s. In December 1983, it became a subsidiary of the Airlines of Britain Group. Further aircraft were added to the fleet: British Aerospace Jetstream 31, British Aerospace Jetstream 41, and British Aerospace ATP aircraft. In the late 1980s, Loganair was the fastest-growing scheduled operator at Manchester Airport, and, in terms of number of flights, was the airport's second-busiest carrier.

After a restructure of British Midland Group in early 1994, Loganair's routes outside Scotland and the aircraft used to operate them were transferred to Manx Airlines. In mid 1994, the airline became a franchisee of British Airways, operating the remaining Shorts 360 and BN-2 Islanders in the British Airways livery. This would stand until July 2008, when it became the new franchisee of Flybe.

In 1996, Airlines of Britain announced it would split its regional airlines into a separate grouping which would enable it to increase its franchise links with British Airways while British Midland looked to increase ties with Lufthansa. The new airline was renamed the British Regional Airlines Group (BRAL), with the British Airways franchise operations of Manx Airlines and Loganair operating under the British Regional Airlines banner.

In 1997, a management buy-out occurred with Loganair becoming independent of BRAL and operating just six aircraft (one de Havilland Canada DHC-6 Twin Otter and five Britten Norman Islanders) with 44 staff.

=== Operations as Flybe franchise ===
In June 2005, Loganair was awarded a contract from the Irish Government to operate a daily return service from Knock to Dublin. This public service obligation (PSO) route operated for a period of three years as British Airways, with effect from 22 July 2005. The operation ceased in July 2008, the contract having been lost to Aer Arann. The airline also bought routes from Citiexpress in March 2004.

Until October 2008, Loganair was a British Airways franchisee, operating flights sold through BA using BA flight codes. Loganair's inter-island operations between the Orkney and Shetland Islands carried out using Britten-Norman Islanders were removed from the franchise agreement in 2004. The flights have since been marketed under Loganair's own name, rather than British Airways'. Loganair became a franchise airline of Flybe, operating in the Flybe colours. Flights are also operated under a codeshare agreement with British Airways connecting flights from Scotland to London. The franchise has been criticised by residents in the Scottish islands for what they perceive to be excessively high fares, and a Facebook campaign set up in June 2015 to highlight the issue attracted over 7400 "likes" over the course of its first weekend.

=== Purchase of ScotAirways ===
On 8 July 2011, it was announced that Loganair had agreed to purchase Cambridge based ScotAirways. ScotAirways continued to trade as a separate entity (using its original name of Suckling Airways) and holding its own licences and approvals until April 2013.

Services to Belfast and to Birmingham from Dundee ended on 2 December 2012. After CityJet had terminated its services between Dundee and London City Airport in January 2014, Loganair took over the route, operating from Dundee to London Stansted Airport, with the support of a PSO agreement.

In May 2015, two Viking Air DHC-6-400 Twin Otter aircraft were acquired by Highlands and Islands Airports to be operated by Loganair on the Scottish Government's Public Service Obligation routes between Glasgow and Campbeltown, Tiree and Barra. In August 2015, the airline became part of a new regional airline group, Airline Investments Limited (AIL), along with East Midlands-based airline bmi regional.

On 21 November 2016, Flybe and Loganair announced that their franchise agreement would terminate on 31 August 2017. Despite headlines, it is unclear who initiated the termination. Loganair later relaunched its website without renewed interline agreements with Flybe or Aer Lingus.

In April 2017, pending the termination of the Flybe franchise agreement, Loganair unveiled its new independent corporate livery on Saab 340B Freighter G-LGNN. From 1 September, the airline began operating "in its own right" for the first time in 24 years. Loganair signed a codeshare agreement with British Airways (BA), effective from 1 September 2017 (coinciding with the launch of independent operations), allowing passengers to book through flights onto BA's global network.

=== Reactions to the demise of other airlines ===
In February 2019, following Flybmi's cessation of operations, Loganair announced that it was to take over Flybmi's routes from Aberdeen to Bristol, Oslo and Esbjerg, from Newcastle to Stavanger and Brussels, and from City of Derry Airport to London-Stansted. A BALPA tribunal into Loganair's swift action following the closure of Flybmi found that the carrier had been acting lawfully, despite the fact that it had created several contingency plans for the demise of UK airlines Eastern Airways and Flybe.

In March 2020, following Flybe's cessation of operations, Loganair announced that it was to take over several Flybe routes from Scotland and Newcastle.

=== Potential sale ===
In October 2022, Loganair confirmed that the existing sole owners, brothers Stephen and Peter Bond, were seeking a buyer to act as the company's "custodian for the next generation". The sale process was suspended in October 2023, with the Bond brothers retaining their stake while a fleet renewal programme is completed.

== Destinations ==
As of September 2019, Loganair served 44 destinations in the United Kingdom, the Isle of Man, the Republic of Ireland and continental Europe. Part of Loganair's operations includes the world's shortest scheduled commercial route, between Westray Airport and Papa Westray Airport, a distance of 1.7 miles, and the use of Barra Airport, the only airport in the world to use a beach as a runway. After the collapse of the original Flybe in March 2020, Loganair took over a number of former Flybe routes from Scotland, the North of England and other parts of the UK, with service beginning as little as 10 days later.

In March 2023, Loganair secured a lease from British Airways for 30 additional slot pairs at Heathrow Airport, previously leased to Flybe before its demise in January 2023, and called on the UK government to reform competition remedies in order to ensure that Heathrow slots remain permanently available for UK regional connectivity.

=== Codeshare agreements ===
Loganair has codeshare agreements with the following airlines (as of April 2022):

- British Airways
- KLM

=== Interline agreements ===
Loganair has interline agreements with the following airlines (as of November 2023):

- Aer Lingus
- Air France
- Air Transat
- Emirates
- Etihad Airways
- Ethiopian Airlines
- Finnair
- Hainan Airlines
- Icelandair
- Luxair
- Qatar Airways
- Singapore Airlines
- Turkish Airlines
- Widerøe

== Fleet ==
=== Current fleet ===
As of April 2026, Loganair operates the following aircraft:

Aircraft	In service	Orders	Passengers	Notes
ATR 42-500	4	—	48	
ATR 42-600	2	—	48	
ATR 72-600	10	—	72	
Britten-Norman Islander	2	1	8	Operated for Orkney Islands Council.
de Havilland Canada Dash 6-310 Twin Otter	1	—	19	
de Havilland Canada Dash 6-400 Twin Otter	2	—	19	Operated for the Scottish Government.
Embraer ERJ-145	10	—	49	
Cargo fleet
ATR 72-500F	4	—	Cargo	
Total	35	1		

=== Gallery ===
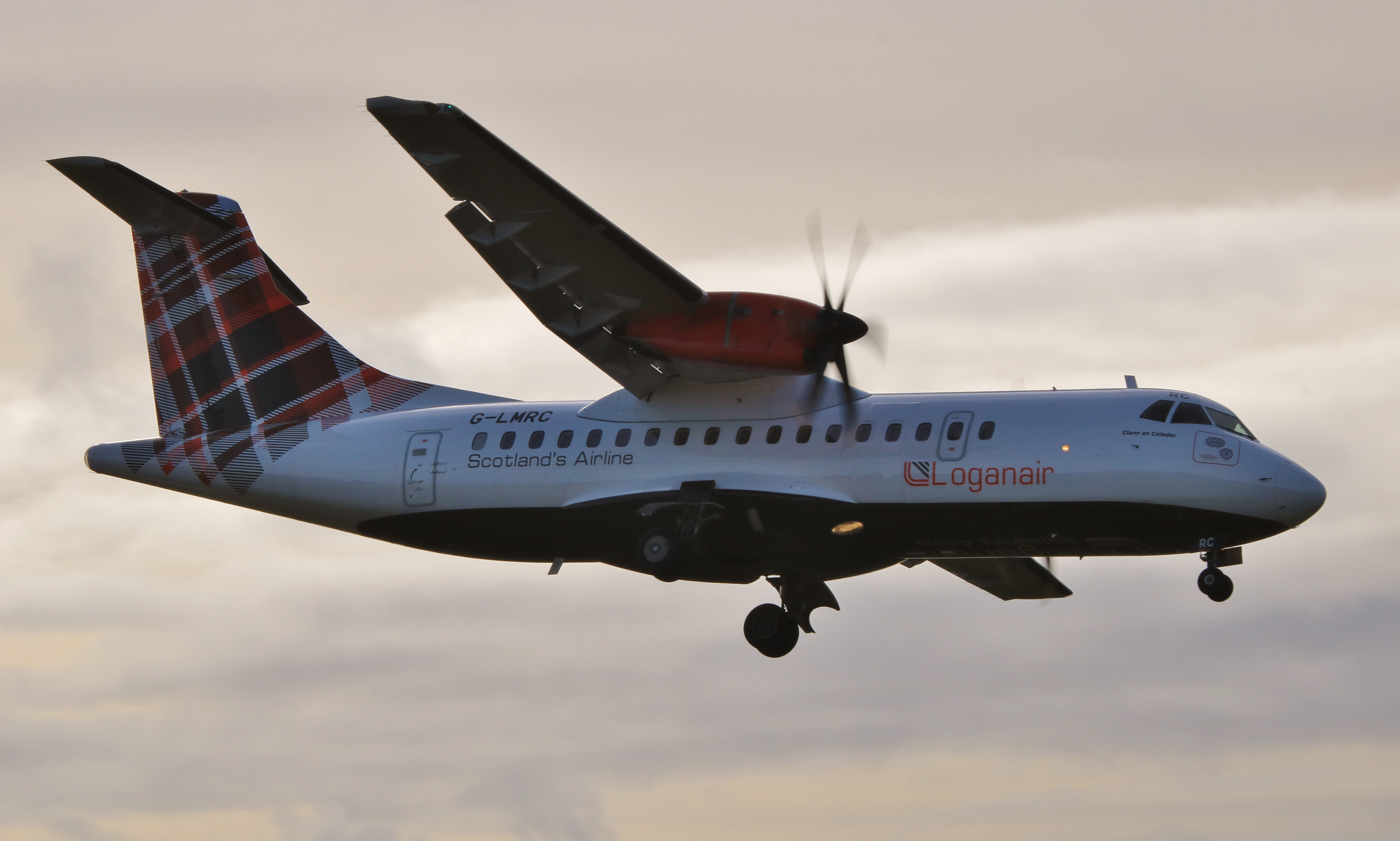
ATR 42-500

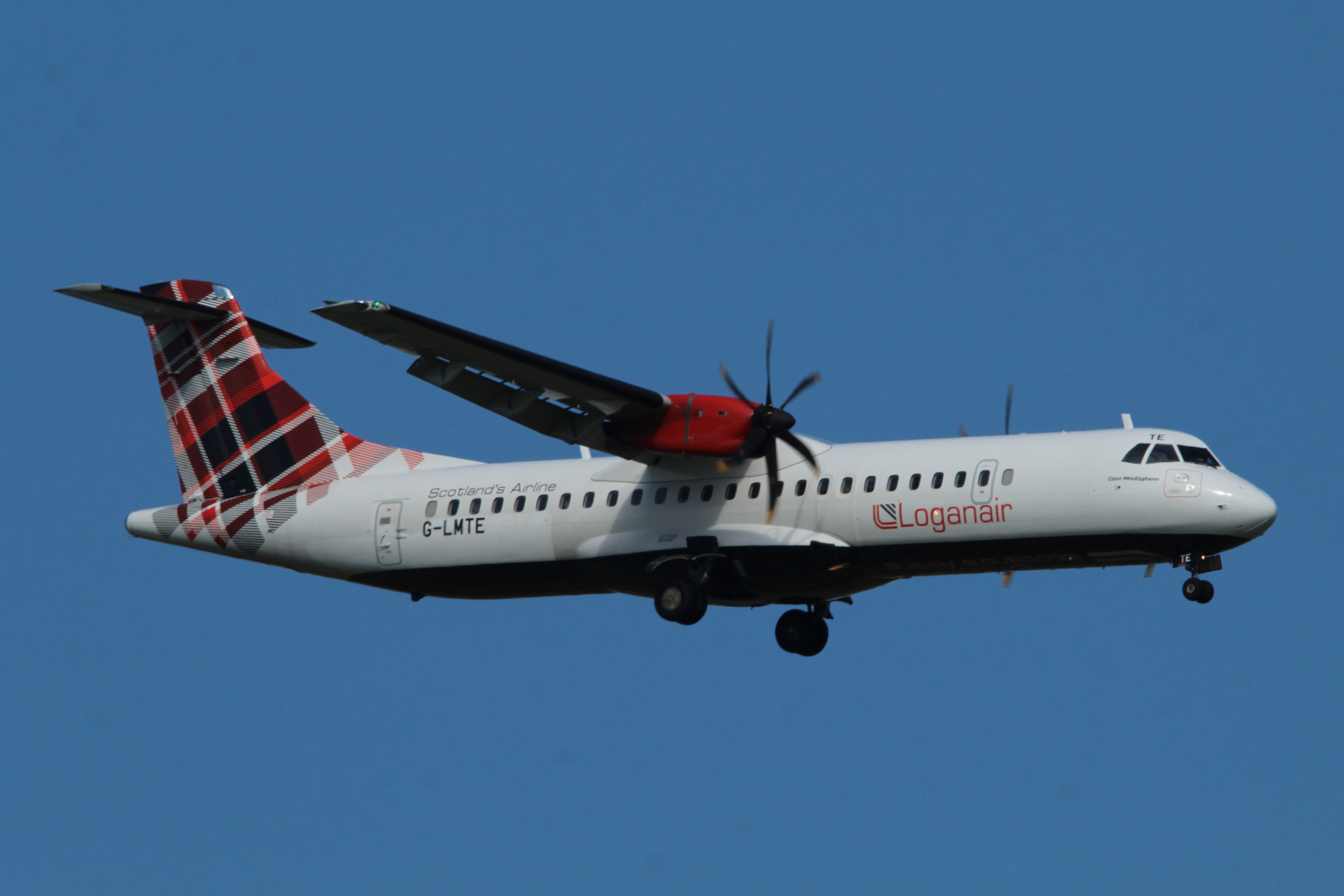
ATR 72-600

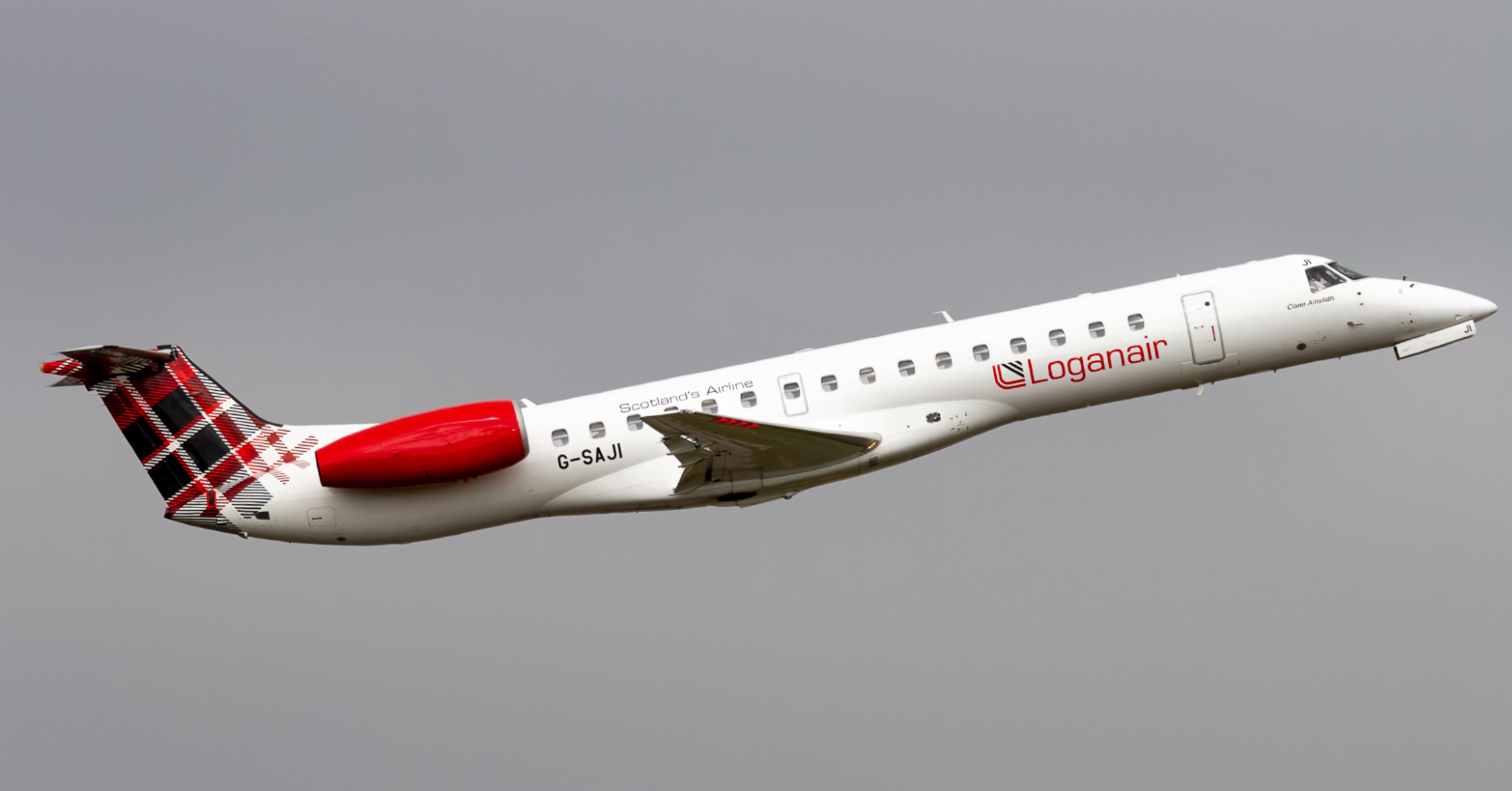
Embraer ERJ-145

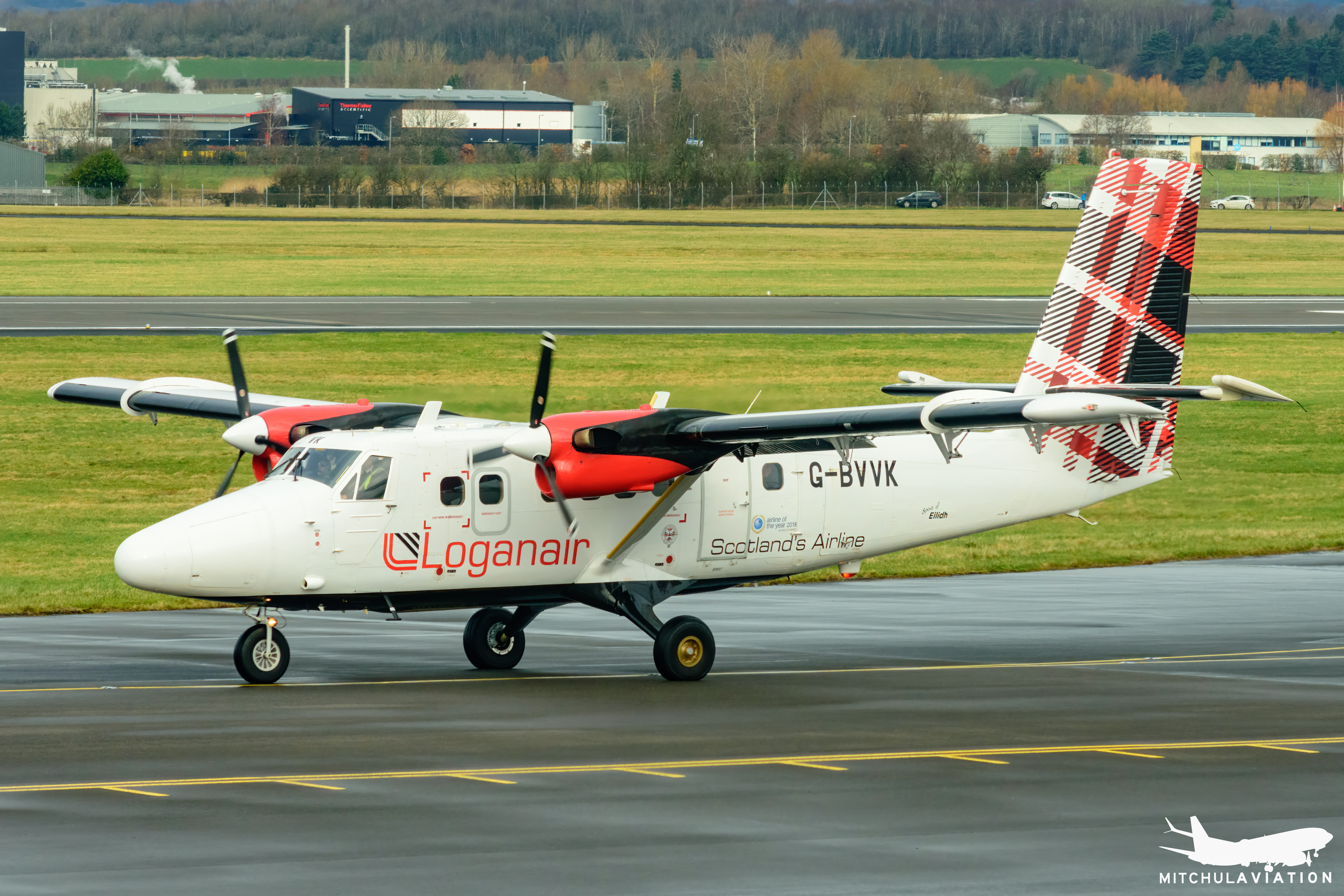
Twin Otter

=== Fleet development ===
In June 2018, Loganair announced plans to add two additional Embraer ERJ-145 aircraft for summer 2019. The aircraft were to be transferred from sister company Flybmi, and would initially operate flights from Loganair's Glasgow base to Derry and Stornoway. Loganair also planned to use the Embraer ERJ-145 aircraft to launch new routes to European airports not previously served from Glasgow. In November 2018, the company announced that approximately twenty ATR 42 aircraft would be added to replace the Saab 2000 and Saab 340 aircraft in the third quarter of 2019.

In April 2019, its Dornier 328 fleet was withdrawn and stored. Loganair returned the last of its Saab 2000 aircraft to the lessor on 25 March 2020.

Its Saab 340s were retired in January 2024, to be replaced by eight new ATRs which will complement the existing ATR fleet. In January 2024, Loganair announced plans to introduce a hydrogen fuel cell-powered Britten-Norman BN-2 Islander on its Orkney island-hopping routes by 2027. The aircraft could be either a new build or a conversion of one of the airline's existing Islanders.

In September 2024, Loganair announced that it was exploring use-cases for hybrid-electric aircraft as part of an exclusive partnership with manufacturer Heart Aerospace.

At the 2026 Farnborough Airshow, the airline announced its intention to purchase five |BETA Technologies CTOL CX300 electric aircraft for use on its service in the Highlands and islands.

=== Former fleet ===
Loganair's former fleet
Aircraft	Introduced	Retired	Notes	Refs
Piper PA-23	1962	1972		
Beechcraft Model 18	1968	1975	One aircraft (G-ASUG) preserved at National Museum of Flight.	
Short SC.7 Skyvan	1969	1974		
Britten-Norman Trislander	1973	1983	Replaced by de Havilland Canada Twin Otter.	
Short 330	1979	1984	Replaced by Short 360.	
Embraer EMB 110 Bandeirante	1980	Unknown		
Fokker F27 Friendship	1983	1988		
Short 360	1983	2004	Replaced by Saab 340.	
British Aerospace 146	1988	1992		
BAe Jetstream 31	1991	1994		
British Aerospace ATP	1991	2005		
BAe Jetstream 41	1993	1994		
Dornier 328	2013	2019	Acquired from purchase of Suckling Airways.	
Embraer ERJ-135	2019	2022	Replaced by ATR 42/72.	
Saab 2000	2014	2020	Replaced by ATR 42/72.	
Saab 340	1999	2024	Replaced by ATR 42/72.	

== Accidents and incidents ==
- On 12 June 1986, a DHC-6 Twin Otter aircraft with 16 people on board struck high ground on the island of Islay in poor weather. The pilots had mistakenly identified the coastal village of Laphroaig as the town of Port Ellen, near Islay Airport. There was one fatality, a pilot.
- In 1996, a Britten-Norman Islander was destroyed in Shetland. The accident occurred during a night time return flight to the aircraft's home base following a medical evacuation flight. The aircraft crashed short of the runway whilst attempting to land after a previous discontinued approach in strong gusting cross winds. The pilot had exercised his discretion to extend the period for which he was allowed to fly that day. The pilot's medical certificate had expired nineteen days earlier thus invalidating his pilot's licence. The pilot was killed in the crash and a doctor on board was seriously injured; a nurse seated at the rear of the aircraft sustained minor injuries.
- On 27 February 2001, Flight 670A, a Short 360 registered G-BNMT operating a Royal Mail flight to Belfast, crashed into the Firth of Forth shortly after taking off from Edinburgh at 1730GMT. Both crew members were killed. There were no passengers on board. An Air Accidents Investigation Branch (AAIB) inquiry later blamed a buildup of slush in the aircraft's engines for the crash. Protective covers had not been fitted to the engine intakes while the aircraft was parked for several hours in heavy snow at Edinburgh.
- On 15 March 2005, a Britten-Norman Islander crashed into the sea while descending toward Campbeltown Airport in western Scotland. The aircraft was operating on an unscheduled air ambulance flight. Both occupants, the pilot and one passenger (a paramedic with the Scottish Ambulance Service), died in the crash. As a result of this accident, the European Aviation Safety Agency (EASA) accepted Safety Recommendation UNKG-2006-101 from the UK's accident investigation report, which the European Commission adopted into regulation, making passenger shoulder harnesses mandatory on all commercial air transport aircraft weighing less than 5,700 kg (12,600 lb) and having fewer than nine passenger seats.
- On 15 December 2014, Flight 6780, a Saab 2000 registered G-LGNO, was struck by lightning whilst approaching Sumburgh Airport. The flight subsequently suffered from control difficulties and nosedived from 4,000 to 1,000 ft (1,200 to 300 m) after the crew tried taking over the controls, but failed to achieve control. The pilot was under the belief that a lightning strike would automatically disengage the autopilot, and the control difficulties were due to opposition from the autopilot system trying to bring them back to the preprogrammed altitude, and it was determined that they only regained control due to a computer malfunction disabling the autopilot system. Once control was regained, they were able to safely return to Aberdeen. There were 33 occupants onboard and no injuries were reported. The subsequent investigation into the incident also revealed that the Saab 2000 was the only Saab model at the time that did not automatically disengage the autopilot with pilot manual control input.

== See also ==
- Bryan Sutherland, engineer
