= City of Derry Airport =

Airport in Northern Ireland

City of Derry Airport Londonderry/Eglinton Airport

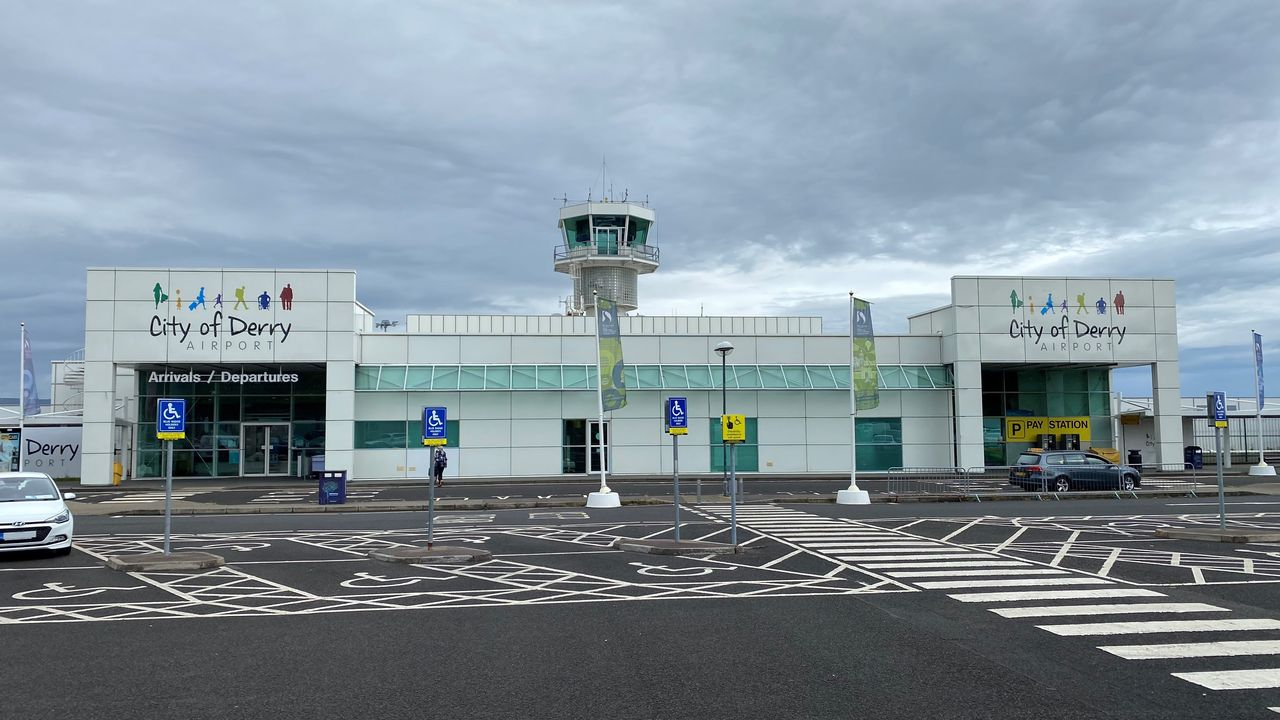
- IATA: LDY; ICAO: EGAE

Summary
- Airport type: Public
- Owner: Derry City and Strabane District Council
- Operator: City of Derry Airport Operations Ltd.
- Serves: Derry
- Location: Eglinton, County Londonderry, Northern Ireland
- Focus city for: Loganair
- Elevation AMSL: 23 ft (7.0 m)
- Coordinates: 55°02′34″N 007°09′43″W
- Website: www.cityofderryairport.com

Map
- City of Derry Airport in Northern Ireland EGAE (island of Ireland) EGAE (the United Kingdom)

Runways
Direction	Length		Surface
Direction	m	ft	Surface
08/26	1,969	6,460	Asphalt

Statistics (2025)
- Passengers: 220,037
- Passenger Change 24-25: ▲22.9%
- Aircraft Movements: 7,231
- Movements Change 23-24: ▲1.7%
- Sources: UK AIP at NATS; Statistics from the UK Civil Aviation Authority

City of Derry Airport (IATA: LDY, ICAO: EGAE), previously known as RAF Eglinton and Londonderry Eglinton Airport, is a regional airport located 7 mi (11 km) northeast of Derry, Northern Ireland. It is located on the south bank of Lough Foyle, a short distance from the village of Eglinton and 8 mi (13 km) from the city centre.

A military base until the 1950s, the airport, known locally as Eglinton Airport, had limited commercial services until the 1990s when it was redeveloped to service larger aircraft. The airport was also renamed as City of Derry Airport at that time.

The redevelopment enabled an increase in passenger numbers from a few thousand a year, to a peak of 438,996 in 2008. The airport experienced a decline in passenger numbers in 2009–2021, due to factors such as the COVID-19 pandemic, Brexit, and underfunding, and reached a low of 73,024 in 2021. Passenger numbers then partially recovered, and in 2025, 217,000 passengers used the airport.

The airport is used as a base for Scottish regional airline Loganair, who operate domestic flights to other parts of the UK. easyJet and Ryanair also operate services to other parts of the UK from the airport.

== History ==
=== 1945–1989 ===
The airport has its origins in the Second World War. In 1941, the Royal Air Force (RAF) Eglinton air base was established as the home to No. 133 Squadron RAF which flew Hawker Hurricanes in defence of the city. In 1942 the base was occupied by No. 41 Squadron RAF. In 1943 the airfield became a Fleet Air Arm base called RNAS Eglinton (HMS Gannet) and was home to No. 1847 Fleet Air Arm Squadron which provided convoy air cover as part of the Battle of the Atlantic. RNAS Eglinton closed in April 1959 with the remaining squadrons moving to RAF Ballyhalbert, County Down and RAF Ballykelly, County Londonderry.

After the war, the base remained a military establishment until the 1950s when the Ministry of Defence returned much of the land to the original landowners. The original name of the airport was Londonderry Eglinton Airport and it was usually just referred to as "Eglinton". Some limited commercial activities were undertaken at the airfield during the 1960s when Emerald Airways operated a service to Glasgow. Emerald built a new terminal building and control tower to support services with the first flight to Glasgow operating on 16 September 1967. During most of the 1970s, the only flying at Eglinton was carried out by Eglinton Flying Club which is still based at the airport. In 1978 Londonderry City Council (Note: Londonderry City Council became Derry City Council in 1984.) decided to purchase the airfield with a view to improving the transport infrastructure for the northwest of Ireland. The airport has slowly developed since then with private short-haul charters to various destinations within the British Isles, a service which still continues including the recent addition of helicopter pilot training and charter services. Loganair introduced the first scheduled flight between Derry and Glasgow in 1979, a route which was dropped due to rising fuel costs. This route was the only route for ten years until Loganair introduced an additional daily Manchester service in 1989.

=== 1989–2006 ===
A major redevelopment programme was undertaken by the council from 1989 to 1993 with grant aid from the European Regional Development Fund. £10.5 million was spent upgrading all of the facilities at the airport including runways, taxiways, access roads, navigation equipment, and runway lighting, as well as a new purpose-built terminal and fire station. The new terminal was officially opened in March 1994. The name of the airport was officially changed from Londonderry Eglinton to the City of Derry Airport by Derry City Council following nationalist support within the newly renamed council. However, as of May 2014, the Aeronautical Information Publication published by the UK's air navigation service provider, National Air Traffic Services, still shows Londonderry/Eglinton. At that time there were still only two scheduled routes carrying about 40,000 passengers each year. 1995 saw the arrival of Jersey European Airways who attempted to operate a short-lived shuttle link between Derry and Belfast City Airport.

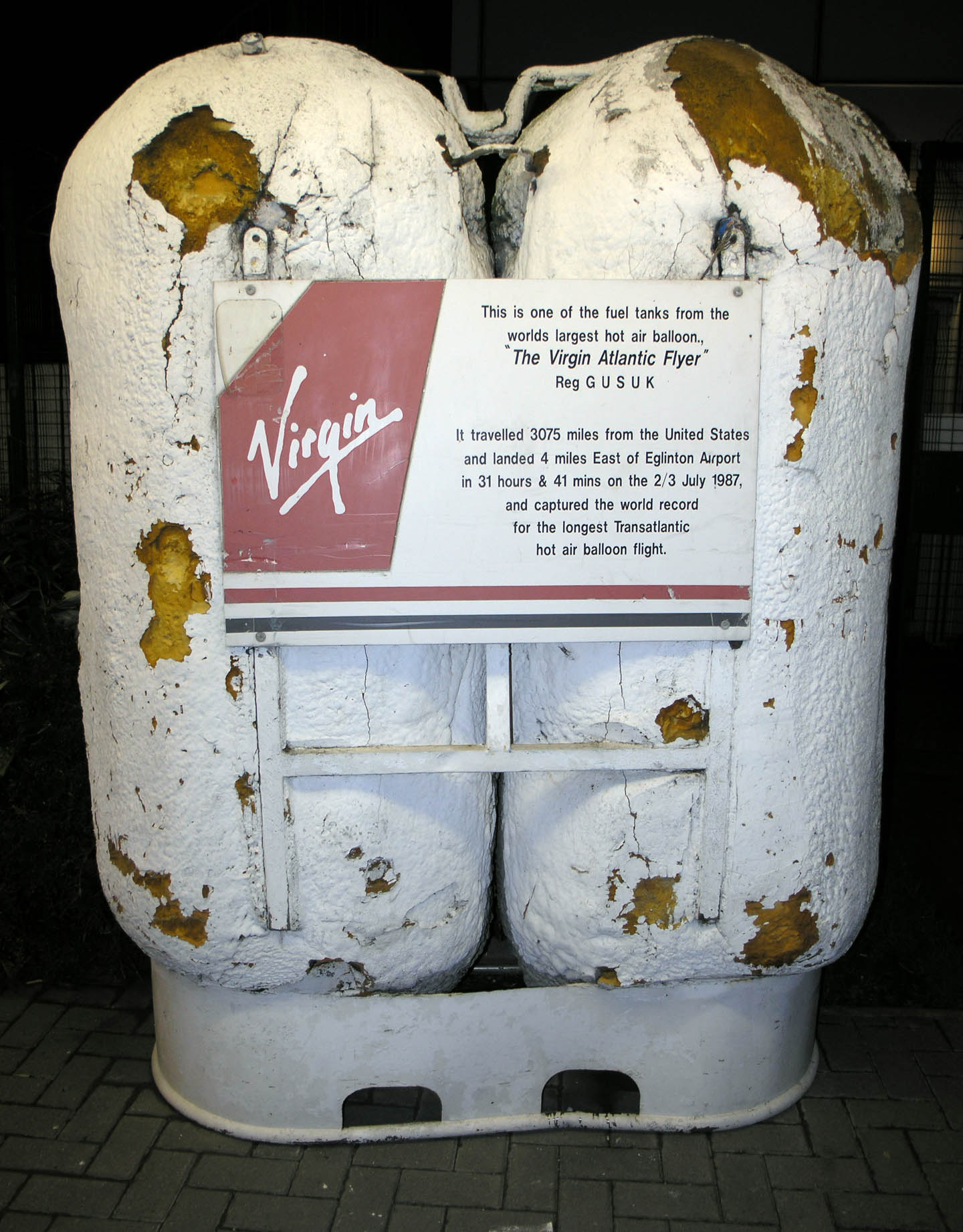
Fuel Tanks currently displayed at the airport from the Virgin Atlantic Flyer, the transatlantic hot air balloon, which landed four miles away in 1987

During 1998 and 1999 safety improvements were undertaken at the airport as a matter of priority. As the airport served Northern Ireland and County Donegal in the Republic of Ireland, funding was sourced and thereafter provided by the Irish Government in addition to that provided by the British Government and Derry City Council. These improvements meant that larger aircraft could use the airport, thus, Air 2000 started holiday charter flights, on behalf of Falcon Holidays, in May 1999, followed in July by Ryanair who operated scheduled flights. The Ryanair service to London Stansted grew substantially and the Loganair routes continued to operate until October 2008 as a British Airways franchise, including a sector to Dublin, initiated as a public service obligation route, subsidised by the Irish Government. Soaring fuel costs saw all British Airways operations to Northern Ireland suspended. British Airways has since returned to Northern Ireland by buying British Midland Airways (bmi) and continuing operating the route to London Heathrow Airport from George Best Belfast City Airport.

Aer Arann operated services to Manchester and Birmingham for a short time.

=== 2006–2011 ===
In May 2006, the European Commission gave its approval for the British and Irish governments to invest €15 million in the airport. Although this work did not include the lengthening of the single serviceable runway, it included the expansion of the safety zones at each end which would allow jets to land and take off with full passenger capacities. Operators of Boeing 737 jets were previously limited to 80% capacity as a safety feature due to the short length of the runway. Other works included the expansion of the apron immediately in front of the control tower which would allow for the parking of several aircraft at any one time. As a prelude to the expansion at the airport several families were removed from their homes under a Government Compulsory Purchase scheme before the buildings and outbuildings were demolished.

The decrease in operational hours at the airport as a direct consequence of the challenging economic conditions have caused problems for Eglinton Flying Club and the helicopter flight training facility, who in turn have threatened to leave the airport if the decisions are not reversed. They have claimed that this would cost the airport some £250,000 in annual revenue while the owners, Derry City Council, have countered that the decrease in operational hours was necessary as part of the implementation of the £600,000 budget reduction plan.

In January 2009, the council appointed Albert Harrison, the former head of Belfast International Airport, as the new manager of the airport. He had been tasked with turning the loss-making facility around and has been given just six months to implement savings of £600,000 per annum and increase the number of carriers, destinations, and passengers.

The recently completed runway safety zone extension and apron works have allowed the CAA to lift the capacity restriction on aircraft operating out of the airport. This has increased seat availability and passenger throughput at the airport. It also enabled Ryanair to establish their first international route from the airport to Alicante.

In April 2009 the council issued tender documents for a multimillion-pound expansion of the terminal to improve passenger flow and meet current EU customs and immigration regulations. The arrivals hall has recently been improved and tax free shopping, WHSmith and the Amelia Earhart Business lounge in the departure area are open during operational hours.

On 9 October 2009, Derry City Council who own and operate the airport began the process which will lead to the privatisation of the facility. Initially, a holding company will be set up by the council which will own 100% of the shares, thereafter the council intends to do market research to seek the level of interest in private sector investors. As part of the privatisation plan two subsidiaries will be formed that will operate the airport and manage the estate.

In June 2010 it was announced that the Airport was in the final stages of discussion with the Balfour Beatty Group about a management contract, with the objective of bringing additional commercial experience and resources to the Airport for the economic benefit of the region and to reduce the subvention from the City Council.

The Belfast to Derry single-track railway line of Northern Ireland Railways passes close to but not across the tip of the runway at the North Eastern end. Because it is in the Runway End Safety Area, safety systems ensure that no train can pass when aircraft are taking off or landing.

=== 2011–2022 ===
Ryanair axed its services to Alicante and Birmingham in 2014, followed by its service to Faro in 2016. In 2017, Ryanair axed its daily service to London Stansted. In response, the airport submitted a public service obligation request to the Department for Transport. The Northern Ireland Executive also agreed a multimillion-pound funding package for the airport. Flybmi commenced operations on the Stansted route in 2017, with 13 weekly flights. These flights operated up until February 2019, when Flybmi ceased operations.

In October 2018, Ryanair replaced its Derry to Glasgow route with a new route to Edinburgh. Following this decision, Loganair resumed operations to Glasgow, having previously operated the route between 1979 and 2007. In 2019 following flybmi's collapse Loganair announced they would be taking on the route while adding a new service to Manchester.

Loganair ended flights to Manchester in Early 2020 while also reverting flights back to London Stansted from London Southend after previously being switched in September 2019.

In December 2020, Ryanair was forced to axe all of their flights from the UK to non-EU destinations (including UK domestic routes) due to a row with the Civil Aviation Authority (United Kingdom). The CAA required that post-Brexit, all flights originating from the United Kingdom to non-EU-based destinations for airlines with a base airport in the United Kingdom use aircraft with a UK registration (E.g.: G-ABCD). Due to this, Ryanair decided to axe these routes saying "The decision to cancel these flights was taken by Ryanair alone. We will continue to engage with the airline on these matters as we seek to act in the best interest of consumers". The UK regional airline Loganair will launch a route to Liverpool (Ryanair operated from Derry to Liverpool & Edinburgh), replacing the lost Ryanair route, beginning 24 May 2021.

In October 2021 Ryanair announced their return to the airport with a new service to Manchester operating three times a week, which commenced at the beginning of December 2021. Loganair also announced a new route in late October to Edinburgh, this service would launch on 17 May 2022, and operates thrice weekly, increasing to five times weekly in the summer.

=== 2023–present ===
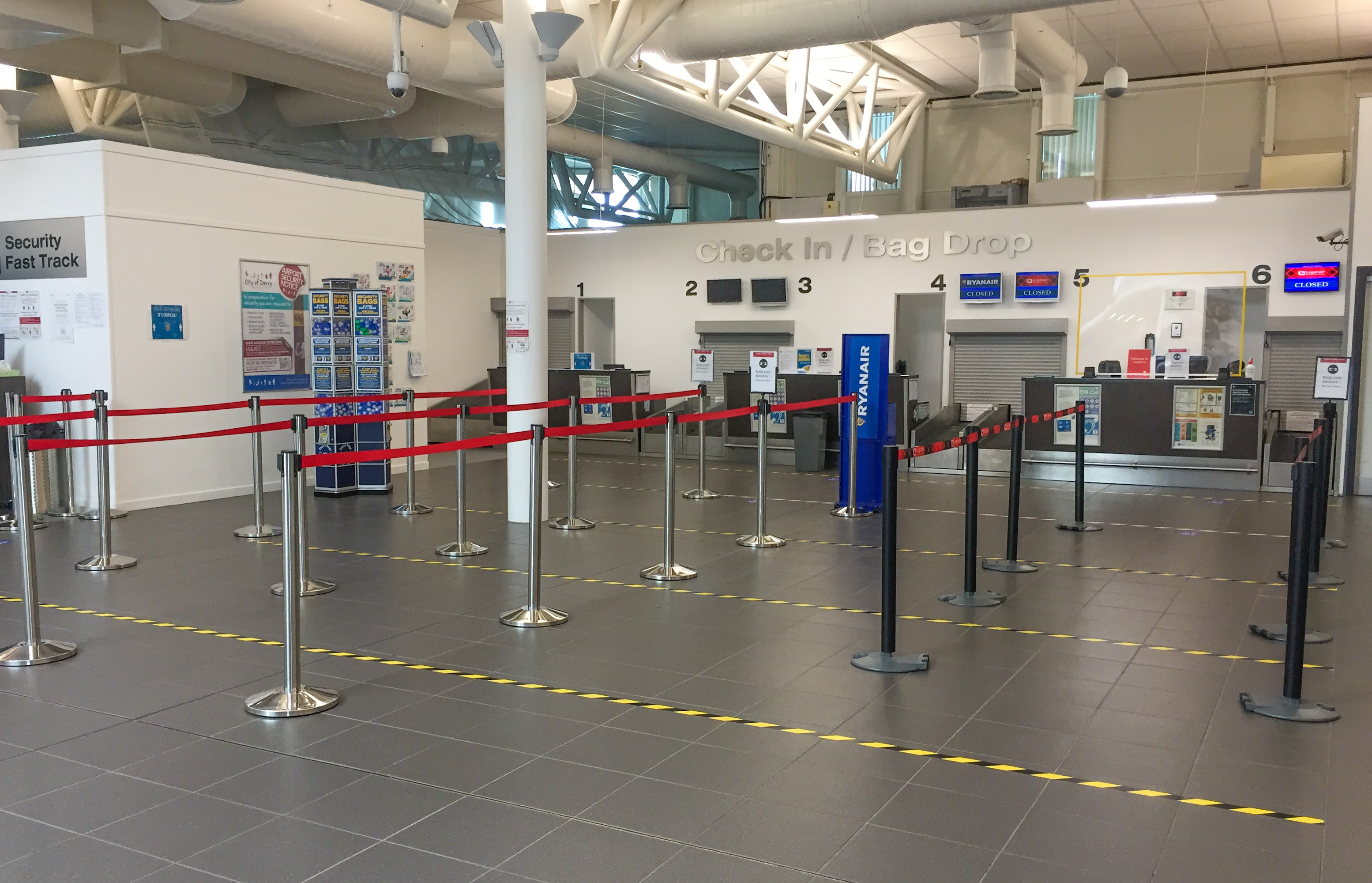
Check-in area

Loganair announced they would be ceasing all flights to Edinburgh from City of Derry Airport from 3 January 2023, as a result Loganair stated they would be increasing the frequency of Glasgow flights to daily. In September 2023 Loganair announced they would no longer operate scheduled flights between City of Derry and Liverpool, with regular services halting in October 2023, and only select dates between then and January 2024 available for purchase.

In January 2024, Ryanair announced they would be launching a new service from Derry to Birmingham twice weekly. It would be the first since a previous Ryanair route connecting Birmingham and Derry was scrapped in 2014. On 4 November 2024 easyJet began flights to the airport for the very first time, re-establishing routes to Edinburgh and Liverpool twice weekly. In April 2025, easyJet announced the launch of a new route to Birmingham, replacing the service operated by Ryanair which ceased at the end of March. The new route is the third new service easyJet has added to its City of Derry network in the last 12 months, making it the largest airline at the airport by destinations served.

== Airlines and destinations ==
The following airlines operate scheduled flights to and from Derry:

Airlines	Destinations
easyJet	Birmingham, Edinburgh, Liverpool
Loganair	Glasgow, London–Heathrow
Ryanair	Manchester

== Statistics ==
In 2025, the airport handled 217,000 passengers on scheduled flights::

City of Derry Airport scheduled passengers
Rank	Airport	Passengers	Change 2024/25
1	London–Heathrow	77,721	▲4%
2	Manchester	53,895	▼8%
3	Edinburgh	29,738	▲466%
4	Liverpool	28,650	▲522%
5	Birmingham	14,085	▼27%
6	Glasgow	12,954	▲2%
