= Suckling Airways =

Regional airline of the United Kingdom (1984–2013)

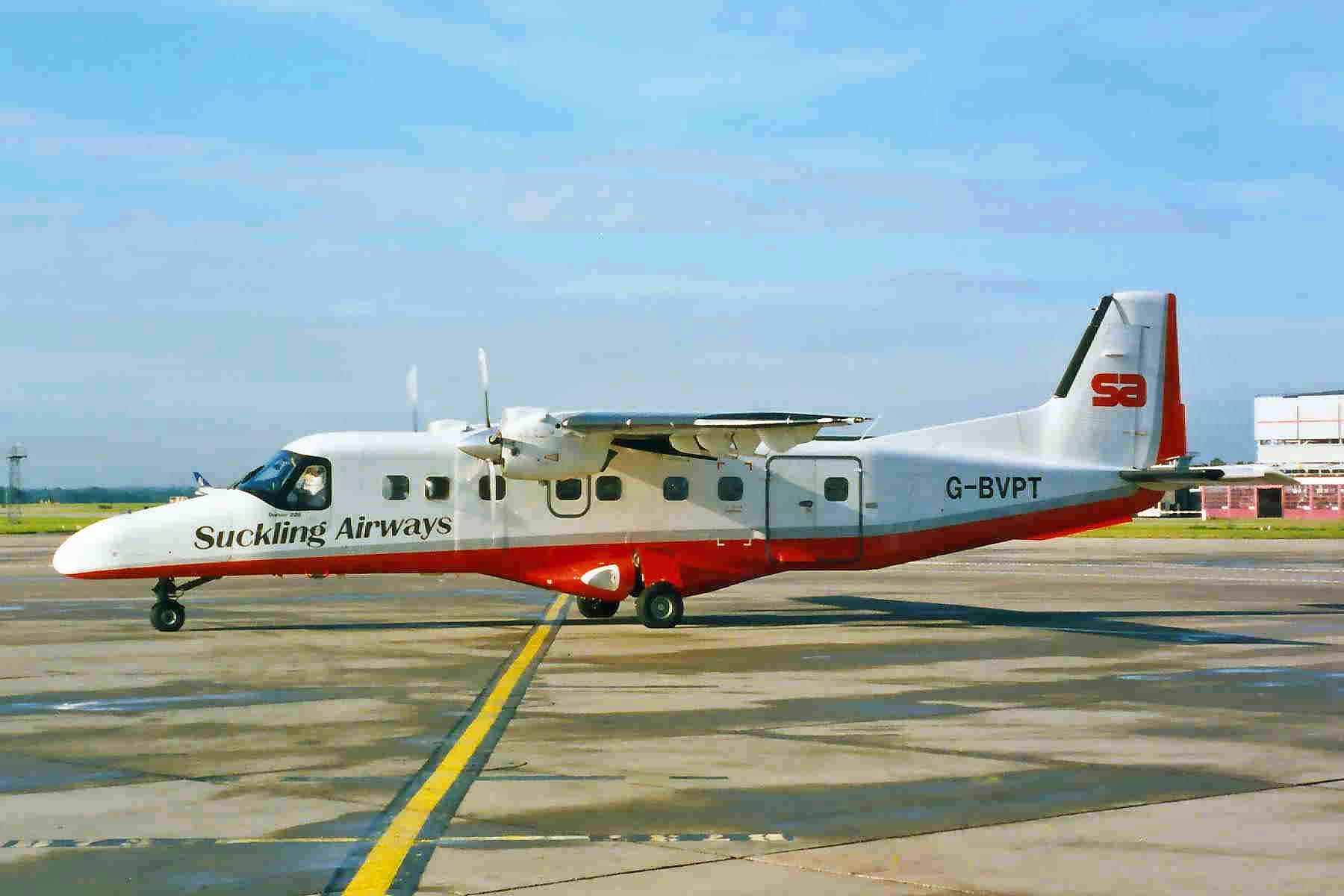
- Dornier 228-202K
IATA	ICAO	Call sign
CB	SAY	SUCKLING
- Founded: November 1984 (as Suckling Aviation)
- Commenced operations: 23 April 1986 (as Suckling Aviation)
- Ceased operations: 2013 (merged into Loganair)
- Headquarters: Cambridge Airport; Cambridgeshire, England, United Kingdom
- Key people: Roy and Merlyn Suckling
- Website: www.sucklingairways.co.uk

Suckling Airways was a British regional airline that focused on ACMI (Aircraft, Crew, Maintenance and Insurance) work and ad hoc air charters for business and sporting organisations. It had its head office at Cambridge Airport, Cambridgeshire. In 2013 it was merged into Loganair, its parent company since two years before.

== History ==
=== From "aviation" to "airways" ===
Suckling Aviation Ltd. was established by Roy and wife Merlyn Suckling in November 1984. Roy had been a flying instructor at Ipswich Flying Club, and Merlyn was a lawyer. Originally the intentions were to operate charter from a grass runway in Ipswich. It started operations in April 1986, an inaugural flight between Ipswich and Manchester, but on 16 (also reported 26) May the first schedules were launched from Ipswich Airport to Manchester and Amsterdam using a single 18-seat Dornier 228. The service was distinguished by the friendly "family" atmosphere engendered by both flight and ground staff. A prominent moment at this time was a lengthy feature about the airline on BBC television's 40 Minutes which showed the introduction of the Dornier 228, and the in-flight meals being prepared in a private home kitchen, although by a professional chef. On 24 May 2026, the BBC Archive uploaded the episode to YouTube.

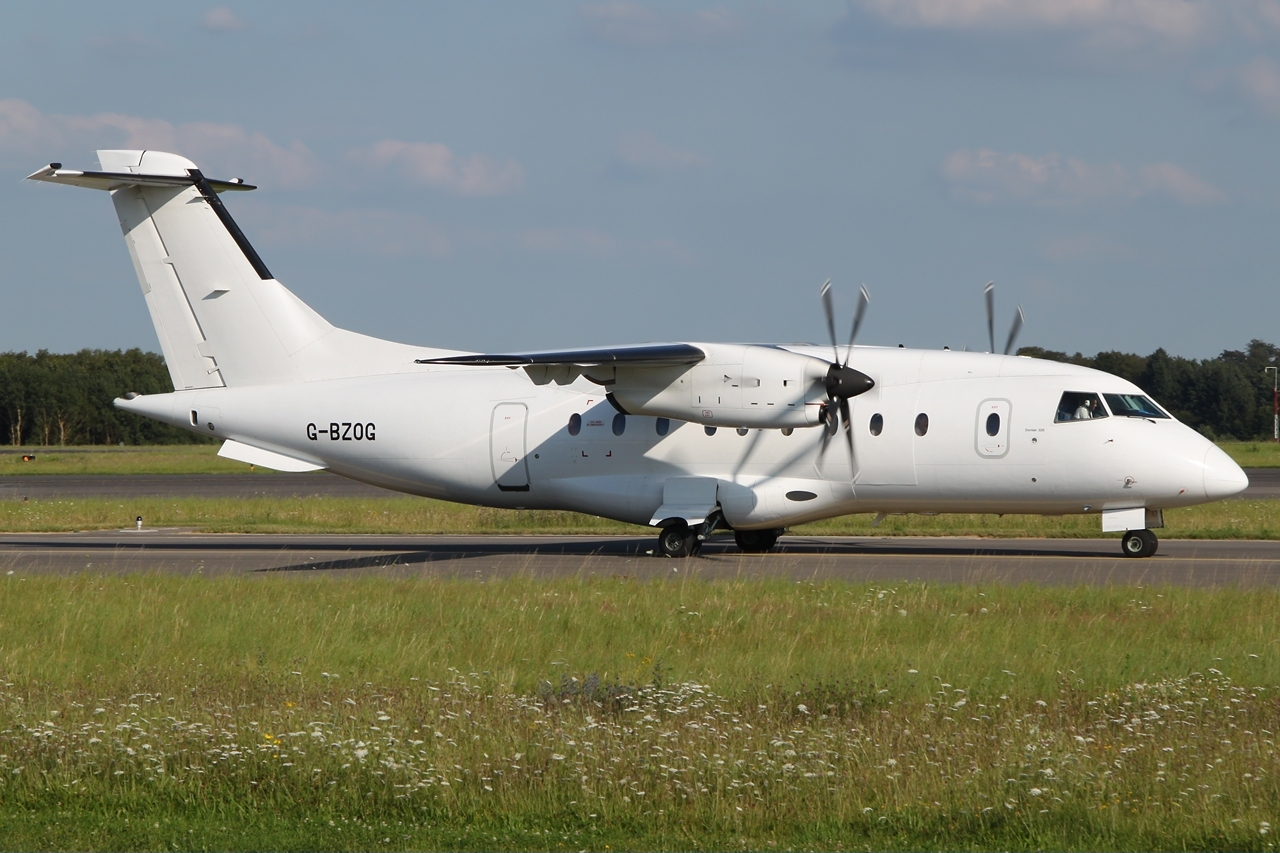
Dornier 328-110

In the winter of 1987, higher than average rainfall began to cause problems at Ipswich Airport, with the grass runway reportedly being damaged by the Suckling Dornier. The damage was particularly acute at the ends of the runway where the aircraft would make its turn. Region Air, the airport operating company, complained vociferously that the Dornier was churning up the runway, and in February 1988, Suckling was forced to temporarily relocate to RAF Wattisham, before finding a more permanent home at Cambridge. Ipswich Airport has been subsequently closed. Modest expansion followed the airline's move to Cambridge, and the airline upgraded to the larger Dornier 328. Services to Edinburgh began, as well as a parallel service from Norwich to the Scottish city. A programme of careful route expansion began in 1994 with the opening of a second hub at London-Luton airport, from where flights to Waterford and Amsterdam helped to double the size of the network. The airline's presence at Luton was further consolidated with the takeover of CityFlyer's Paris (CDG) service on October 29, 1995, flown with a Dornier 328, again making Suckling launch operator of the type.

A year or so later, Manchester and Stansted routes to Rotterdam were also assumed, together with Stansted-Zurich flown under wet-lease. By 1997, Norwich to Manchester, Luton and Edinburgh had been added to the network. Continued growth through 1998, saw the opening of services from Southampton to Amsterdam on January 6, ultimately increased to four times daily, boosting the airline's passenger figures to 110,000. Delivery of a third Do.328 allowed the commencement of flights connecting London City Airport with Glasgow and Dundee from spring 1999. In July of this year the airline corporate name was changed to Suckling Airways (Cambridge) Ltd. but it wasn't to last long as ScotAirways brand was adopted in October. It was the consequence of a major event.√

=== ScotAirways brand ===
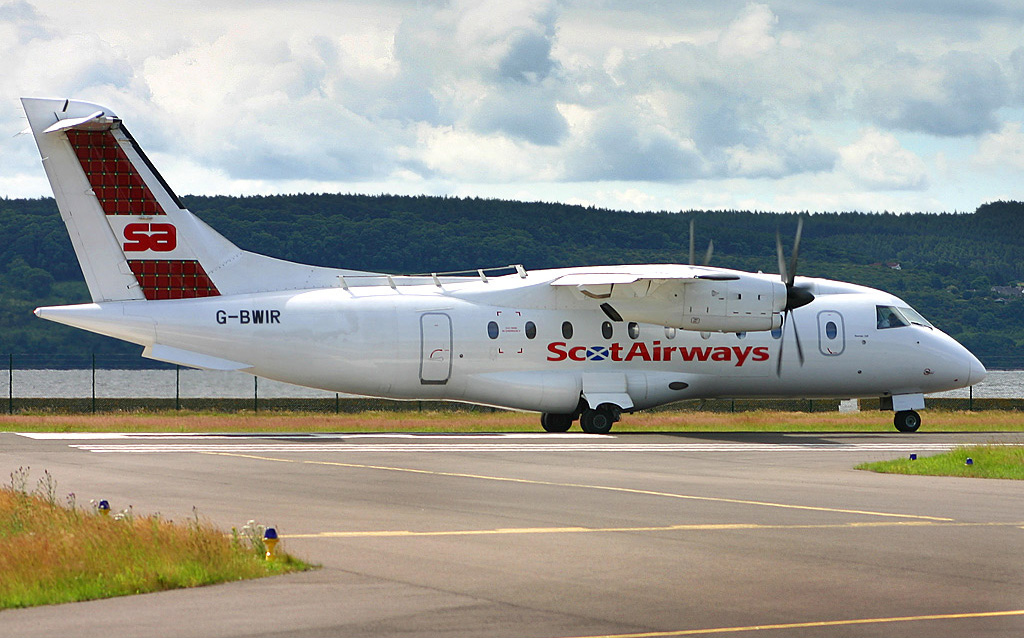
ScotAirways branded Dornier 328 readies for takeoff at Dundee Airport, Scotland

It was during that year that a needed investment was secured from Brian Souter, founder and chairman of the Perth-based transport group Stagecoach and his sister Ann Gloag. Souter and Gloag purchased a 90% stake in the airline for £5m and announced its rebranding as ScotAirways. The Suckling family would remain in charge of the day-to-day management of the airline keeping the head office in Cambridge, while Souter became chairman. A rather ambitious expansion programme began, establishing a hub at London City with services to Edinburgh, Aberdeen, Inverness and Paris, and also from Inverness and Southampton to Amsterdam.

Shortly after the September 11, 2001 attacks in the United States, the airline found itself in the midst of the crisis surrounding the aviation industry. Cutbacks were required for survival, and the services from Inverness, Aberdeen, Glasgow, Paris, Norwich and Cambridge were axed, some only a matter of months since their launch. With the abandonment of Cambridge Airport, Dundee effectively became the base for the carrier's reservations and maintenance, while the head office remained in Cambridge.

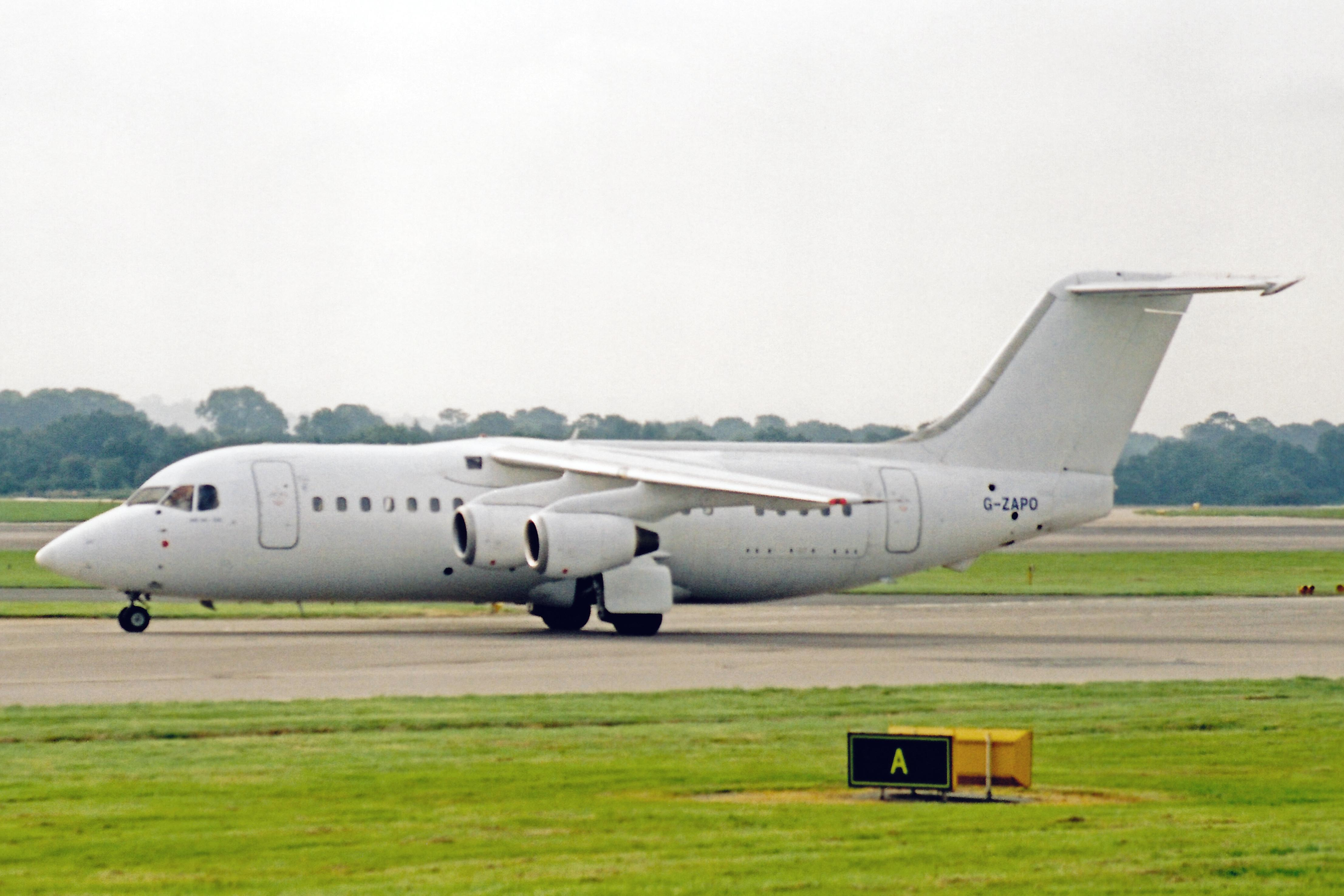
Leased British Aerospace 146

During 2004, the airline marked a recovery by recording its first profit in several years. Frequencies on the remaining routes were increased. The airline carried over 200,000 passengers in 2004, achieving a far higher figure on just three routes than the previous larger network. In the face of heavy competition from British Airways on the Edinburgh to London City route, ScotAirways introduced its first jet aircraft, a leased 80-seat British Aerospace 146, onto the route on 9 May 2005. Code share arrangements were put in place with Flybe on the Edinburgh service and KLM Cityhopper on the Amsterdam route. On 18 September 2006 it was announced that Ann Gloag and Brian Souter had sold their combined stakes in the airline back to Roy and Merlyn Suckling.

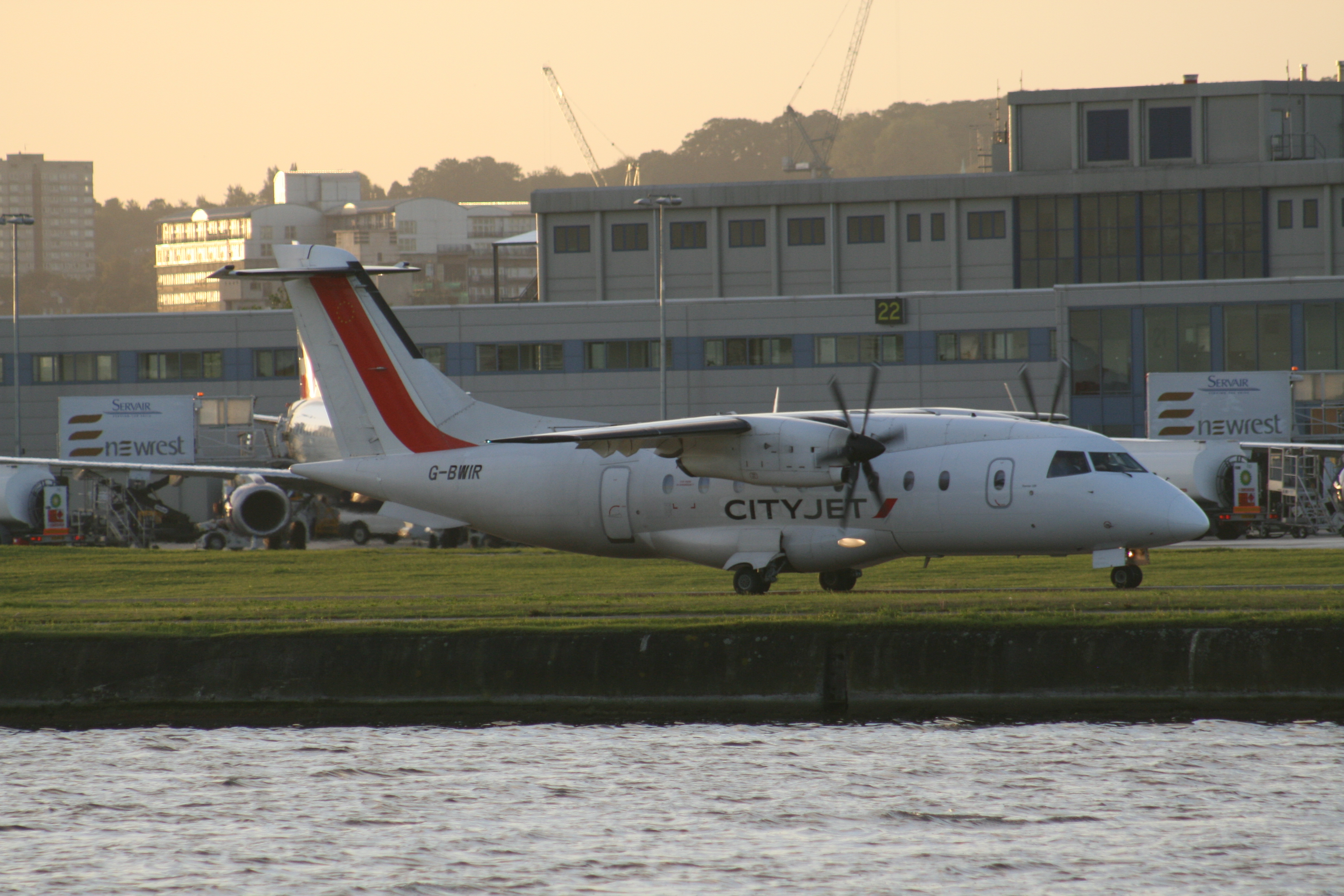
Dornier 328 operating on behalf of CityJet taxiing at London City Airport

Between 26 March and 2 September 2007, ScotAirways operated as a partner airline to the brand new CityJet (CityJet for Air France) for Air France brand which took to the skies from London City Airport. The air carrier operated its existing services to Edinburgh and Dundee as codeshare services with Air France, and in addition launched new services to George Best Belfast City Airport, Strasbourg and Eindhoven from London City Airport on behalf of CityJet. On 10 August 2007 ScotAirways ceased the Southampton-Amsterdam route, and the route to Belfast was discontinued in Spring of 2008.

=== Suckling again ===
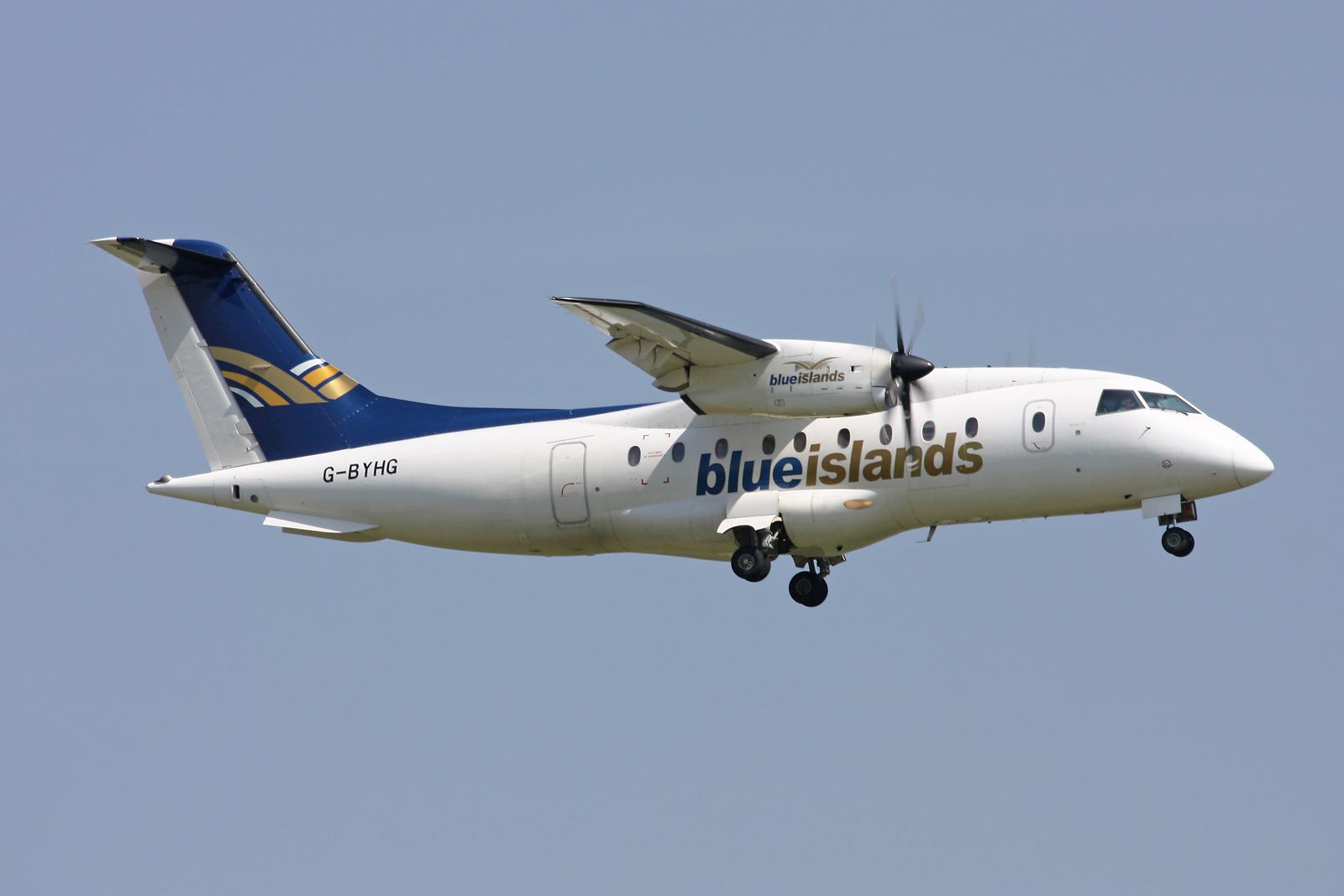
Dornier 328–110 in full Blue Islands colours

By 2 September 2007 the airline stopped operating its own scheduled services, to concentrate on ACMI lease work. In November Suckling began providing ACMI services for Channel Islands airline Blue Islands. One Dornier 328 was painted in the Blue Islands livery and operated routes from Jersey Airport to Geneva Airport and Zurich Airport. Due to the cessation of the London City to Edinburgh route by CityJet, it was announced Suckling Airways would close the London City base at the end of October 2013.

On 8 July 2011, it was announced that Glasgow based airline Loganair had agreed to buy Suckling Airways. The company continued to trade as a separate airline which held its own licences and approvals until April 2013 when it was fully merged into Loganair. Pilots, engineering and cabin crew became full Loganair employees. Other staff were made redundant with headquarters functions transferred to Glasgow.

== Fleet ==
Prior to ceasing operations, Suckling Airways operated six Dornier 328 turboprop aircraft. All were transferred to Loganair.

== See also ==
- List of defunct airlines of the United Kingdom
