= White Eagle Aviation =

Polish airline

IATA	ICAO	Call sign
W2	WEA	WHITE EAGLE
- Founded: 1992
- Ceased operations: 2010
- Hubs: Warsaw Frederic Chopin Airport
- Fleet size: 4
- Headquarters: Warsaw, Poland

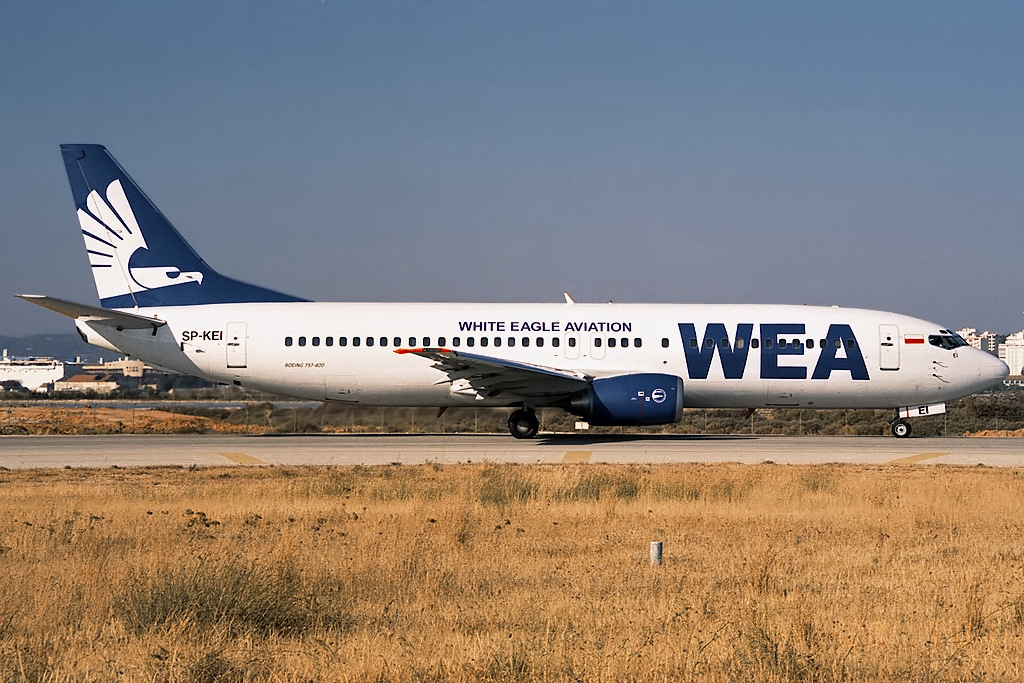
Boeing 737-400 of White Eagle Aviation

White Eagle Aviation was a scheduled and charter, passenger and cargo airline based in Poland. Its main base was Warsaw Frederic Chopin Airport.

== History ==
The airline is established in 1992 and started operations in 1993, initially operating sightseeing tours. In 1995 the company moved to Okecie Airport, starting regular flights for UPS. The airline was owned by Katarzyna Frank-Niemczycka (50%) and Zbigniew Niemczycki (50%). In 2004 WEA was taken over by a new president - Maciej Jaroszuk-Rozycki, responsible for restructuring and successful financial recovery of the airline. He was then joined and superseded by Allan Fullilove as President of WEA with Maciej Jaroszuk-Rozycki continuing as its Vice President; In January 2008 Allan Fullilove became technical director of Kenya Airways while Maciej Jaroszuk-Rozycki has moved to West Air Luxembourg / West Atlantic, becoming its Vice President Sales. The last President of WEA was Ewa Kołowiecka. Between 2000 and 2003 WEA introduced and operated a fleet of Boeing 737-400 and -800 aircraft in partnership with German tour operator TUI Group. At the same time, WEA continued development of cargo flights, operating a fleet of 7 Let-410s and ATR 42-300, as well as helicopters - Mi-8 and Bell 407. After 2004 WEA activity was restructured under leadership of Maciej Jaroszuk-Rozycki, with a new business model of being an ACMI service provider and unification of the fleet. WEA was henceforth focused on delivery of full charter options, primarily to airlines, tour operators, and advertising/incentive agencies. It cooperated mainly at B2B level but also sold capacity through air brokerage companies. It ceased operations in 2010.

=== Flywhoosh ===
White Eagle Aviation were flying internal United Kingdom flights linking Dundee with Birmingham and Belfast, operated by an ATR42, on behalf of Flywhoosh.

These flights commenced on 29 May 2007 but were suspended on 7 December 2007. Flywhoosh and White Eagle Aviation each blamed the other for the dispute, and according to the Civil Aviation Authority White Eagle have stated that they would offer full refunds for all canceled flights.

== Fleet ==
The White Eagle Aviation fleet included the following aircraft (as of 29 September 2008) :

- 2 ATR 42-300
- 1 ATR 42-320
- 1 Raytheon Beech King Air 350

Previously the fleet had also included:

- 7 Let L-410
- 1 Bell-407
- 1 Bell-427
- 1 Mi-8T
- 1 Boeing 737-800
- 3 Boeing 737-400
