= Transport in Scotland =

Overview of the transport system in Scotland

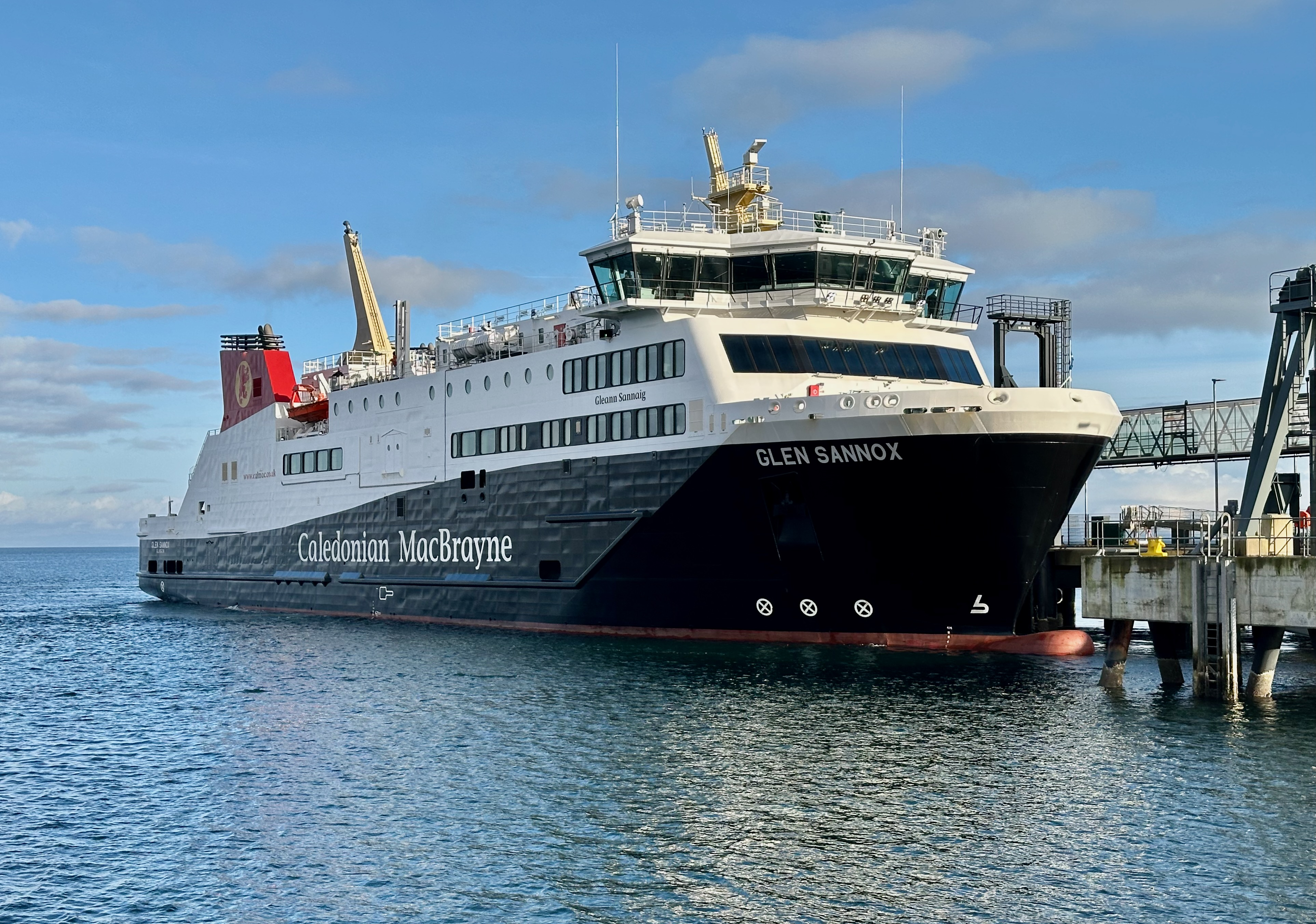
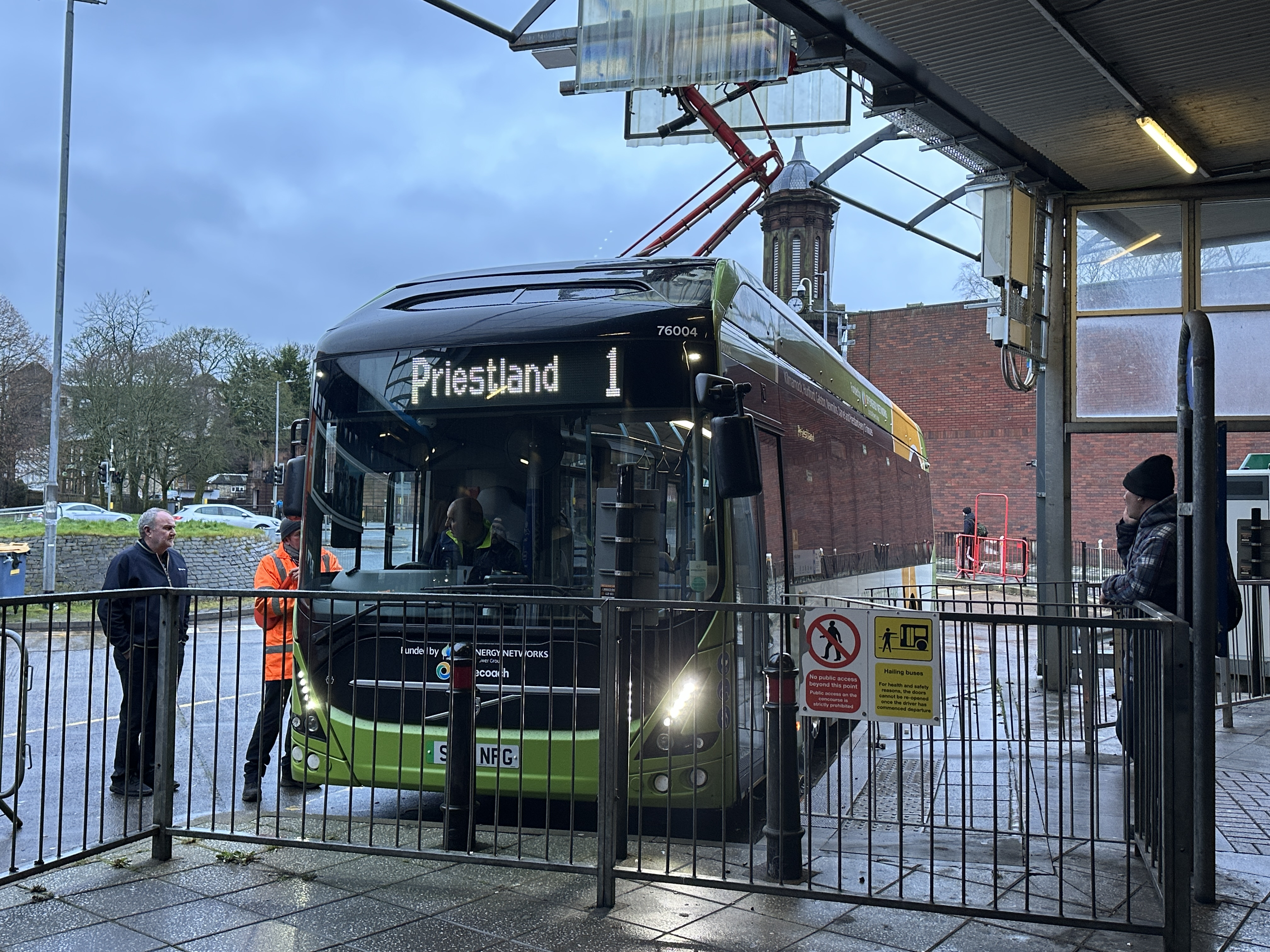
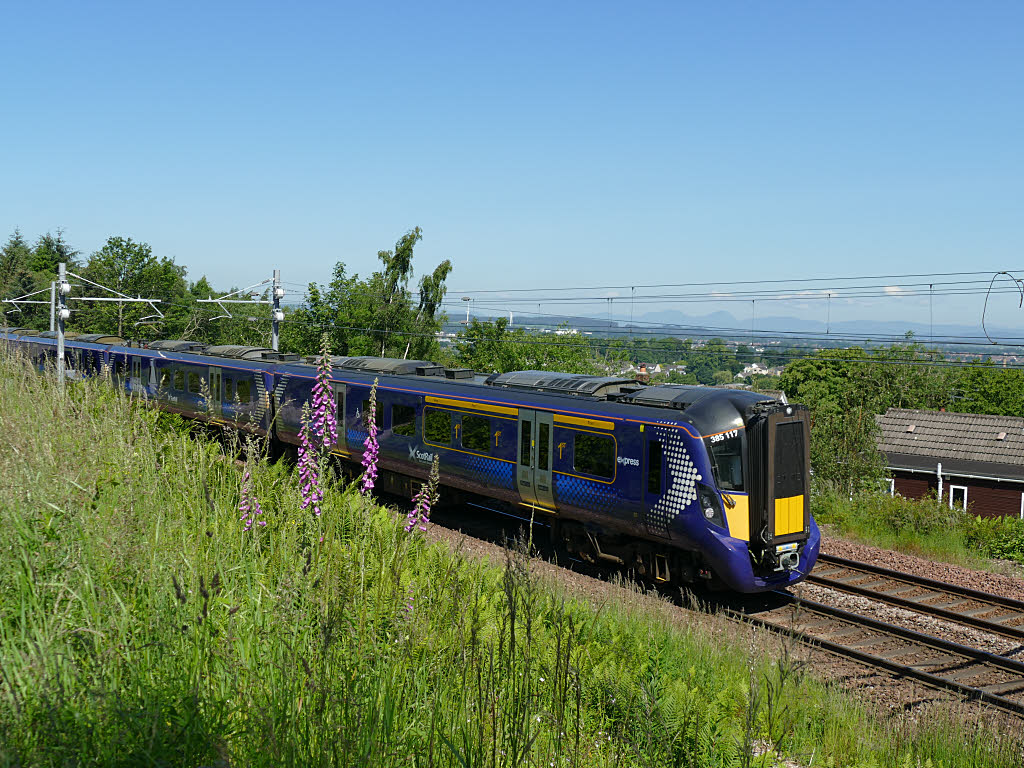
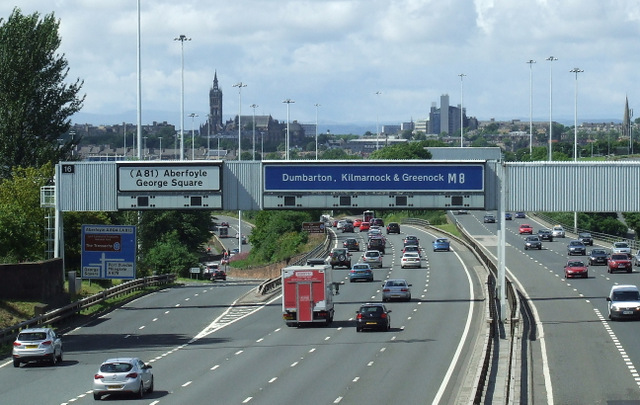
Various aspects of transportation in Scotland; MV Glen Sannox ferry of Caledonian MacBrayne, Stagecoach West Scotland bus at Kilmarnock, ScotRail rail train and the M8 motorway through Glasgow

Transport in Scotland is facilitated by road, rail, air and water networks. The Scottish Government and Scottish Parliament has control over most elements of transport policy within Scotland, with the Cabinet Secretary for Transport holding portfolio responsibility within the Scottish Government. Transport Scotland is the Executive Agency responsible for the Scottish transport network.

The country has five international airports of which Edinburgh Airport is the busiest, handling in excess of 12 million passengers annually. With over 790 islands lying off the Scottish coast, ferry services are primarily operated by Caledonian MacBrayne, a subsidiary of David MacBrayne which is owned by the Scottish Government. Caledonian Maritime Assets is the owner of the ferries, ports, harbours and infrastructure for ferry services serving the west coast of Scotland, the Firth of Clyde and the Northern Isles.

In 2022, the country's rail operations were re–nationalised by the Scottish Government who took over the ScotRail franchise as an operator of last resort. Scottish Rail Holdings is the executive agency of the Scottish Government which operates the ScotRail and Caledonian Sleeper services. Glasgow Central railway station is the country's busiest, with over 25 million passengers in 2025.

== Government responsibility ==
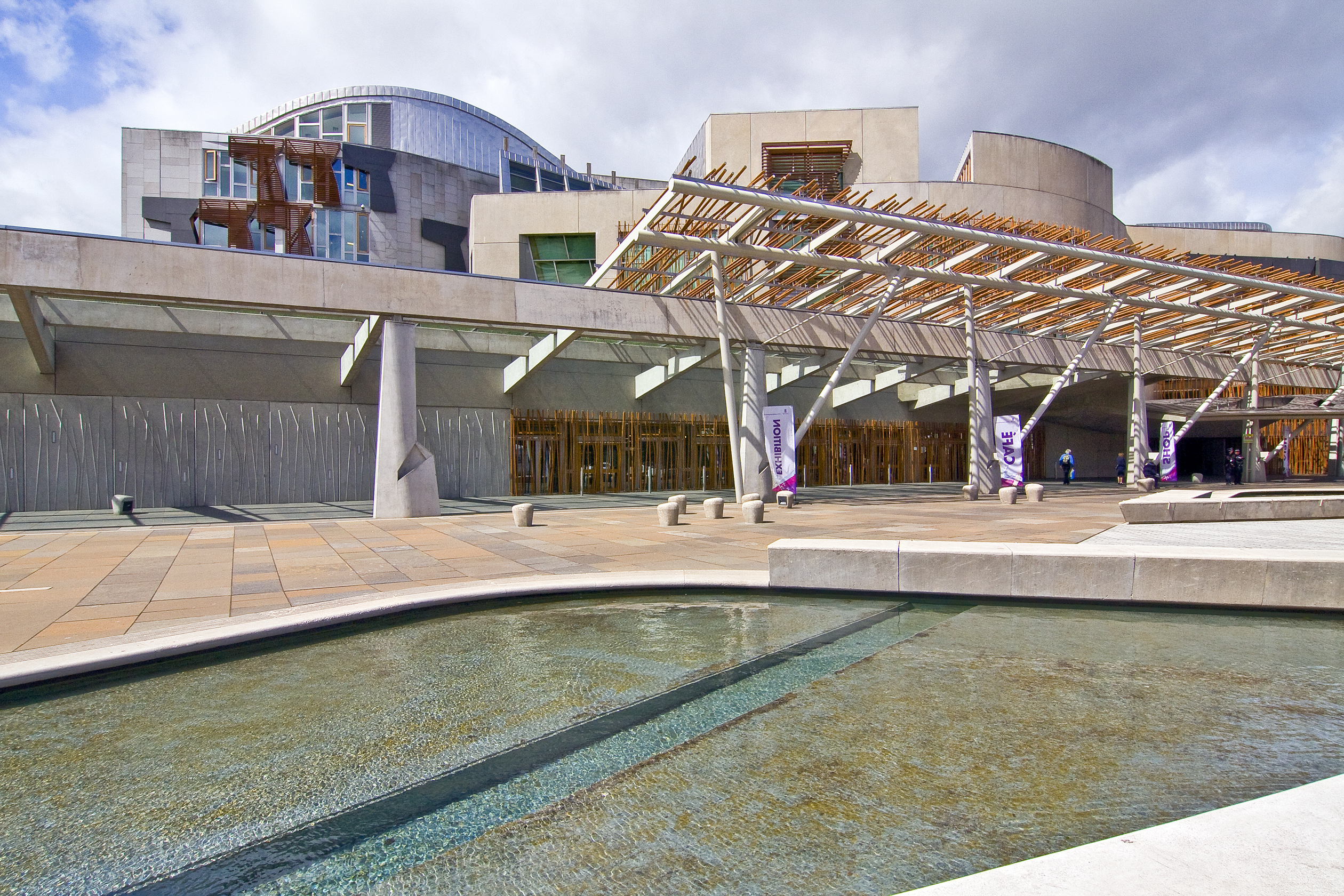
Most aspects of transport in Scotland are the responsibility of the Scottish Government, with legislation on transport passing through the Scottish Parliament in Edinburgh.

The Scottish Government and Transport Scotland are solely responsible for transport in Scotland within the following areas:

- setting drink and drug-driving limits
- speed limits
- some aspects of railways, including Scottish passenger rail franchises
- concessionary travel schemes
- cycling
- parking
- local road pricing (including congestion charging)
- promotion of road safety
- road signs

Some aspects of transport policy and administration are reserved (i.e., not devolved), and are therefore the responsibility of the UK Government's Department for Transport:

- Driving and vehicle certification
- Some legislation regulating Marine transport and Navigation (including most aspects of merchant shipping)
- the Highway Code
- Operation of the Great Britain road numbering scheme
- Transport of radioactive material

== Railways ==
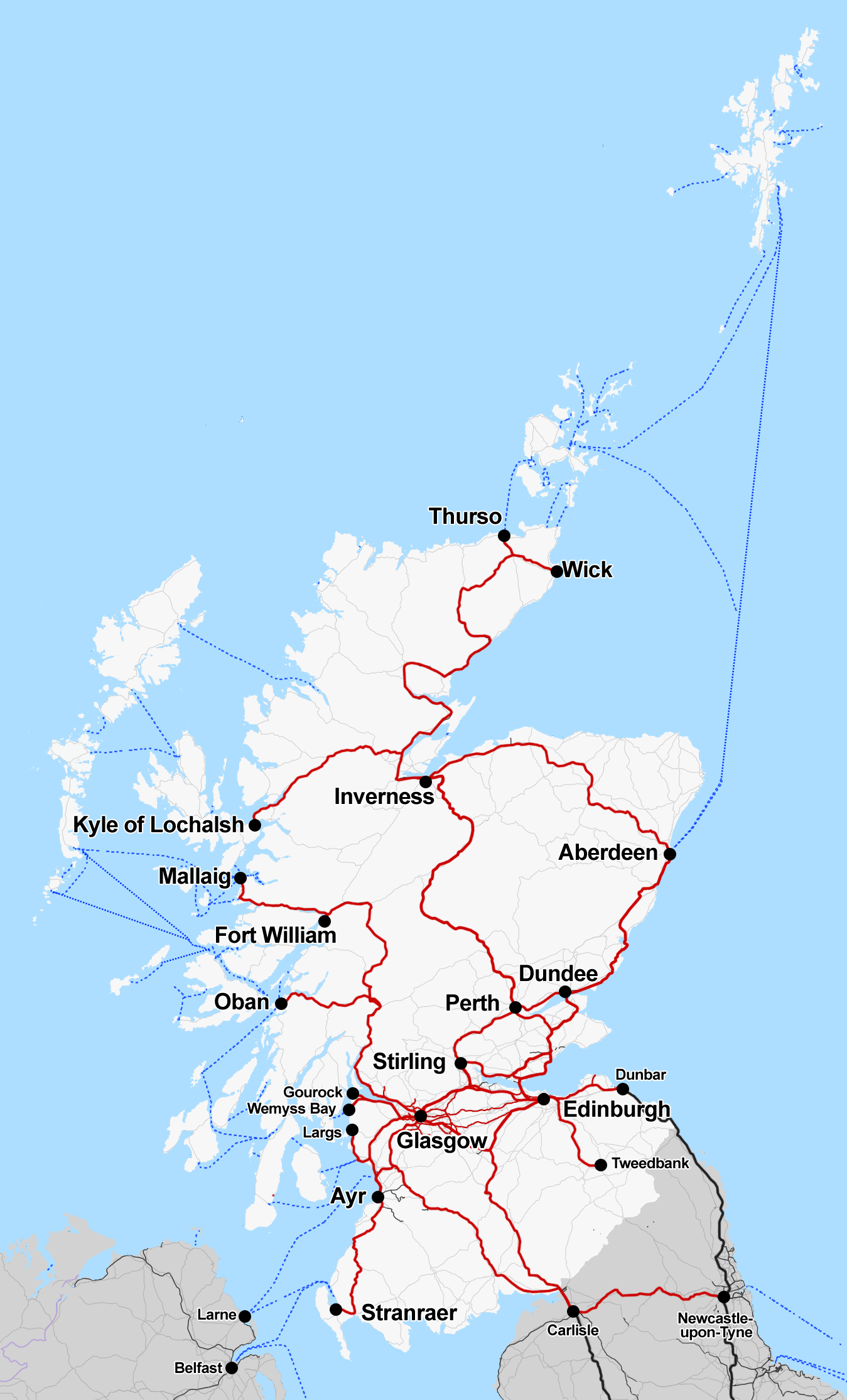
Map of railways in Scotland

Scotland has an extensive railway network, with links across the country, connections to England, local commuter links to the major cities (many of which were electrified under British Rail) and freight. As of 2023, the total route length of the rail network in Scotland is 2,708 km (1,683 miles) of which 887 km (551 miles) is electrified, and there are 362 stations. The first railway in Scotland was the Monkland and Kirkintilloch Railway, opened in 1826. The first passenger railway was the Kilmarnock & Troon Railway. The first railways in Scotland were operated using horse traction. By 1850, Scotland's major cities were linked to each other and to the rest of the British railway network. The second half of the nineteenth century saw a rapid expansion of the network, and by 1900; virtually every town with a population greater than 2,000 on the Scottish mainland had a railway station. At the same time, trains became more comfortable, faster and more frequent whilst the cost of travel declined relative to wages.

Nevertheless, there were probably never more than 100 million or so journeys made per year within Scotland, little more than 20 per head of population, illustrating how most people had little need, financial means or desire to travel long distances. Railways did, though, play an important part in moving freight, especially heavy loads such as coal, iron and steel, and played a vital role in the First World War. After World War I, the Railways Act 1921 also known as the Grouping Act, merged the Caledonian Railway and its rival, the North British Railway into the newly created London, Midland and Scottish Railway and London and North Eastern Railway companies. After World War II, the railways were nationalised by the Transport Act 1947 into British Railways. The Scottish network was reorganised as the Scottish Region (ScR), one of six new regions of British Railways.

The railway network is owned by Network Rail, which is responsible for the majority of the railway infrastructure. Rail services are provided under franchises awarded by the government. The current holder of the Scottish franchise is ScotRail. Intercity services are also operated by Avanti West Coast, CrossCountry, Caledonian Sleeper, London North Eastern Railway and TransPennine Express.

In the 1980s, British Railways (by that point renamed "British Rail") rebranded the Scottish Region as ScotRail. British Rail was privatised in March 1997 by the outgoing Conservative Government. The Scotland franchise was won by National Express who decided to retain the ScotRail brand and operated the franchise until 2004. The Scotland franchise was then operated by First ScotRail until 2015 when Abellio ScotRail was awarded the franchise by the devolved Scottish Government. The Caledonian Sleeper service, which had previously been operated by the Scotland franchise holder from 1997, was separated as a new franchise in 2015. It is currently operated by Scottish Rail Holdings after being taken into public ownership by the Scottish Government and Transport Scotland in 2023.

The East and West Coast Main Lines are the two cross-border railways that connect the networks of Scotland and England. London North Eastern Railway (LNER) provides inter-city rail journeys on the former between Inverness, Aberdeen and Edinburgh to London King's Cross via York, while Avanti West Coast runs services on the latter from either Edinburgh or Glasgow Central to London Euston with some services serving Birmingham New Street. TransPennine Express, Lumo, CrossCountry, Caledonian Sleeper and ScotRail also operate services to England. Domestic rail services within Scotland are operated by ScotRail. Glasgow's Subway is one of the four underground urban rail networks in the UK (the others being in London, Newcastle and Liverpool). Edinburgh has a tramway to and from the airport.

On 1 January 2006, Transport Scotland was established, which would oversee the regulation of railways in Scotland and administer major rail projects. Since April 2022, Transport Scotland has taken ScotRail back into public ownership via its operator of last resort, Scottish Rail Holdings. It did the same with the Caledonian Sleeper service in June 2023.

Railway services in Scotland
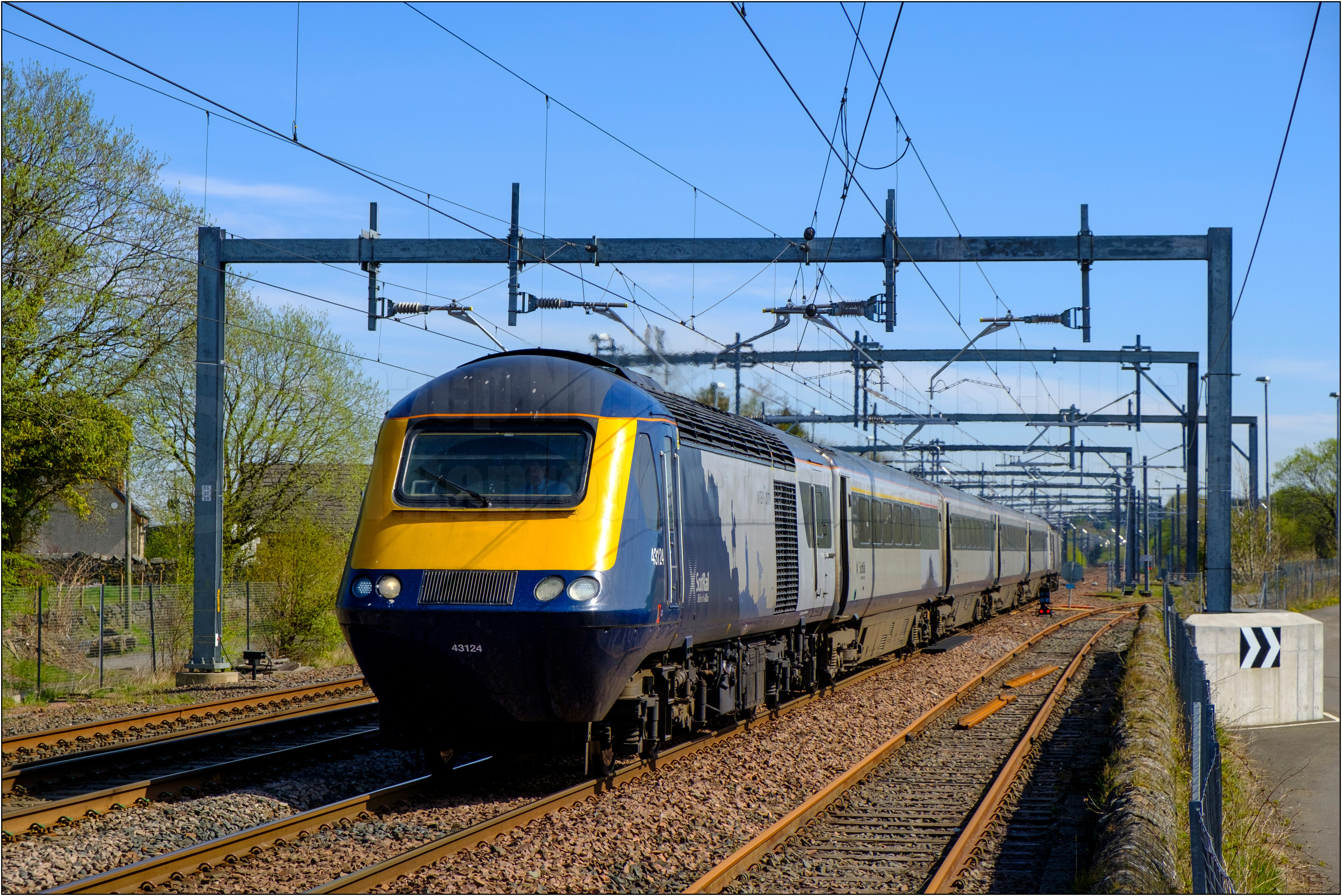
ScotRail Class 43 High Speed Train at Greenhill, Falkirk

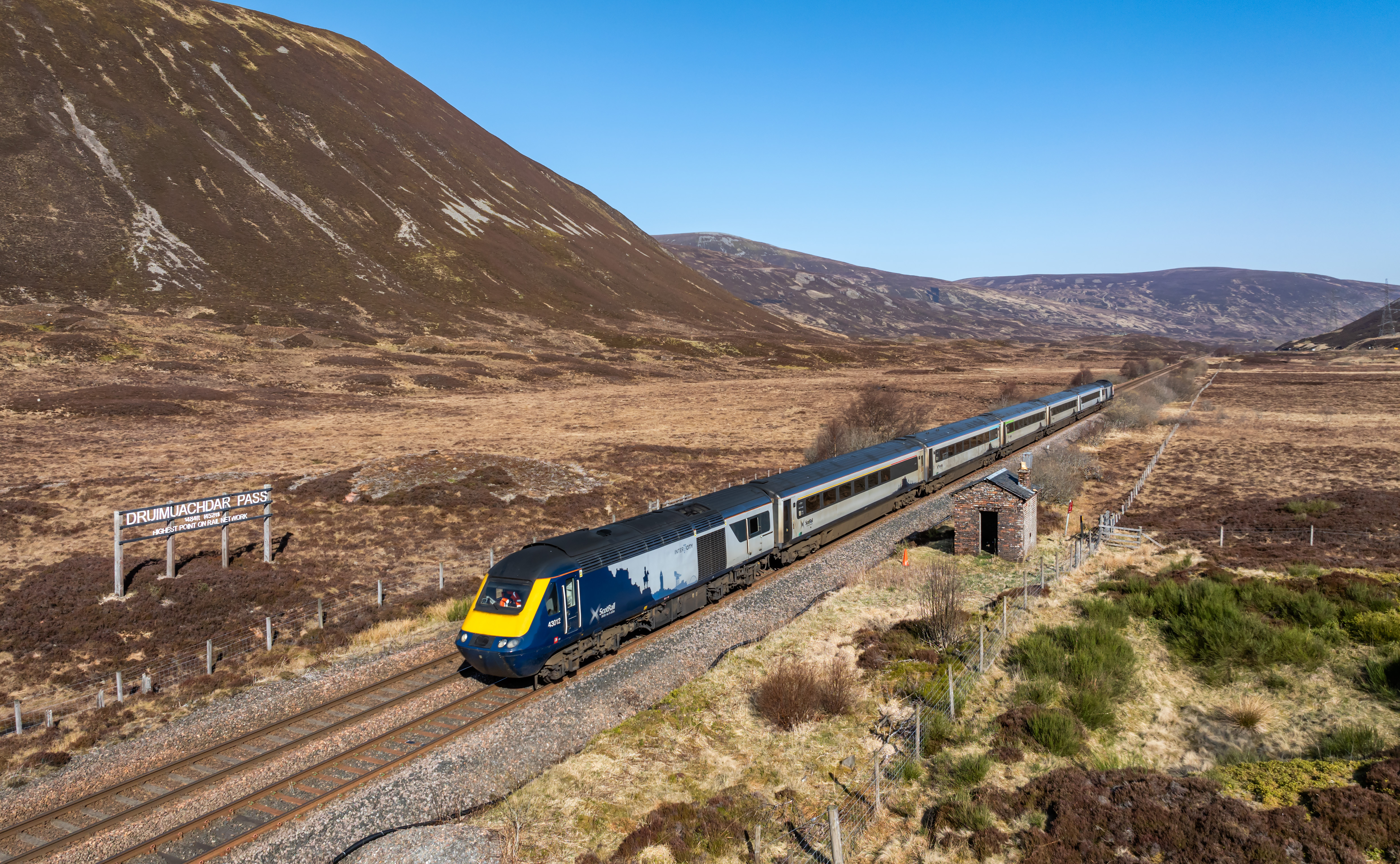
ScotRail's Inter7City 1T84 at Druimuachdar

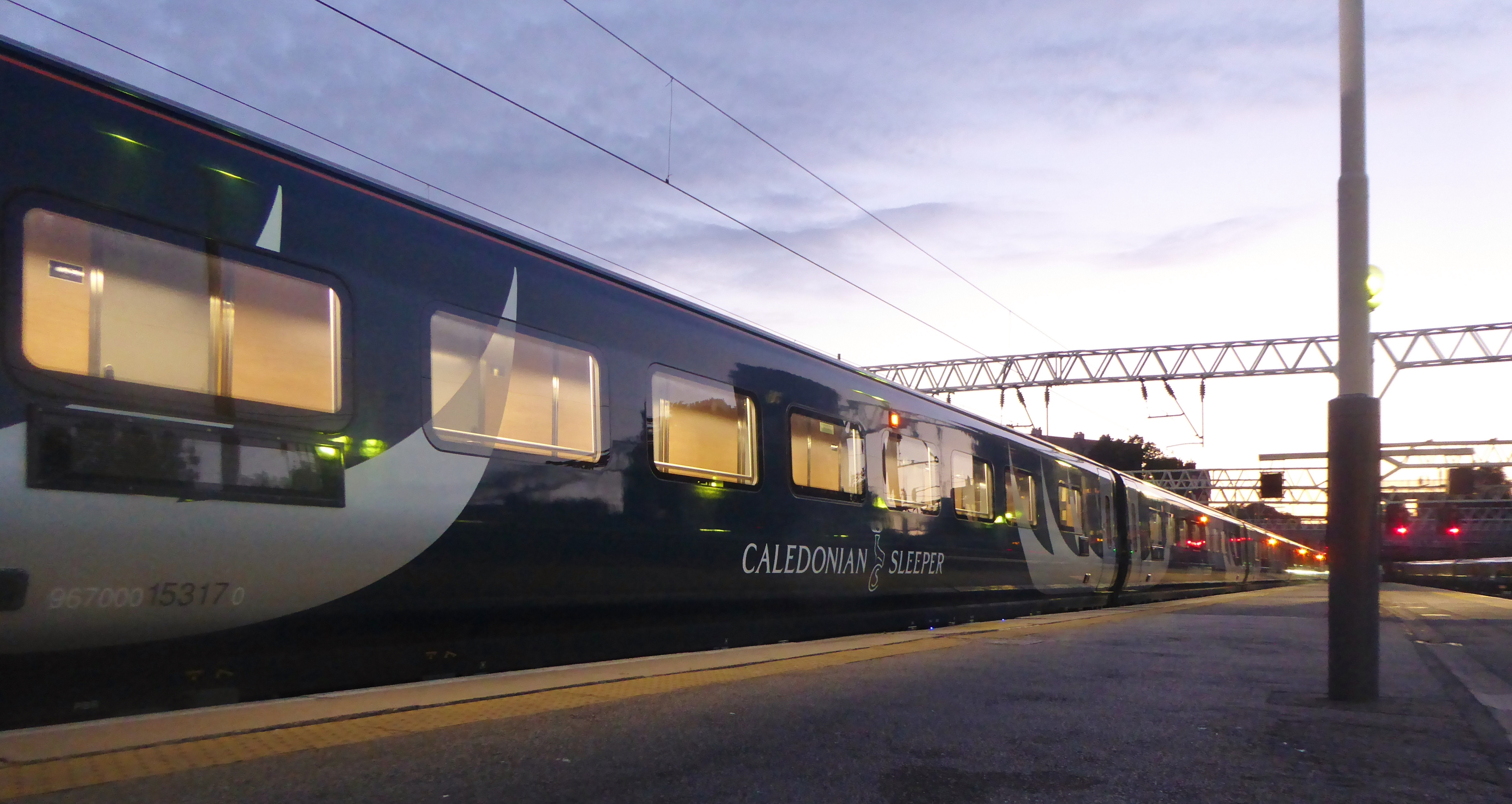
The Caledonian Sleeper, an overnight sleeper train, is operated by Scottish Rail Holdings and travels between Scotland and London.

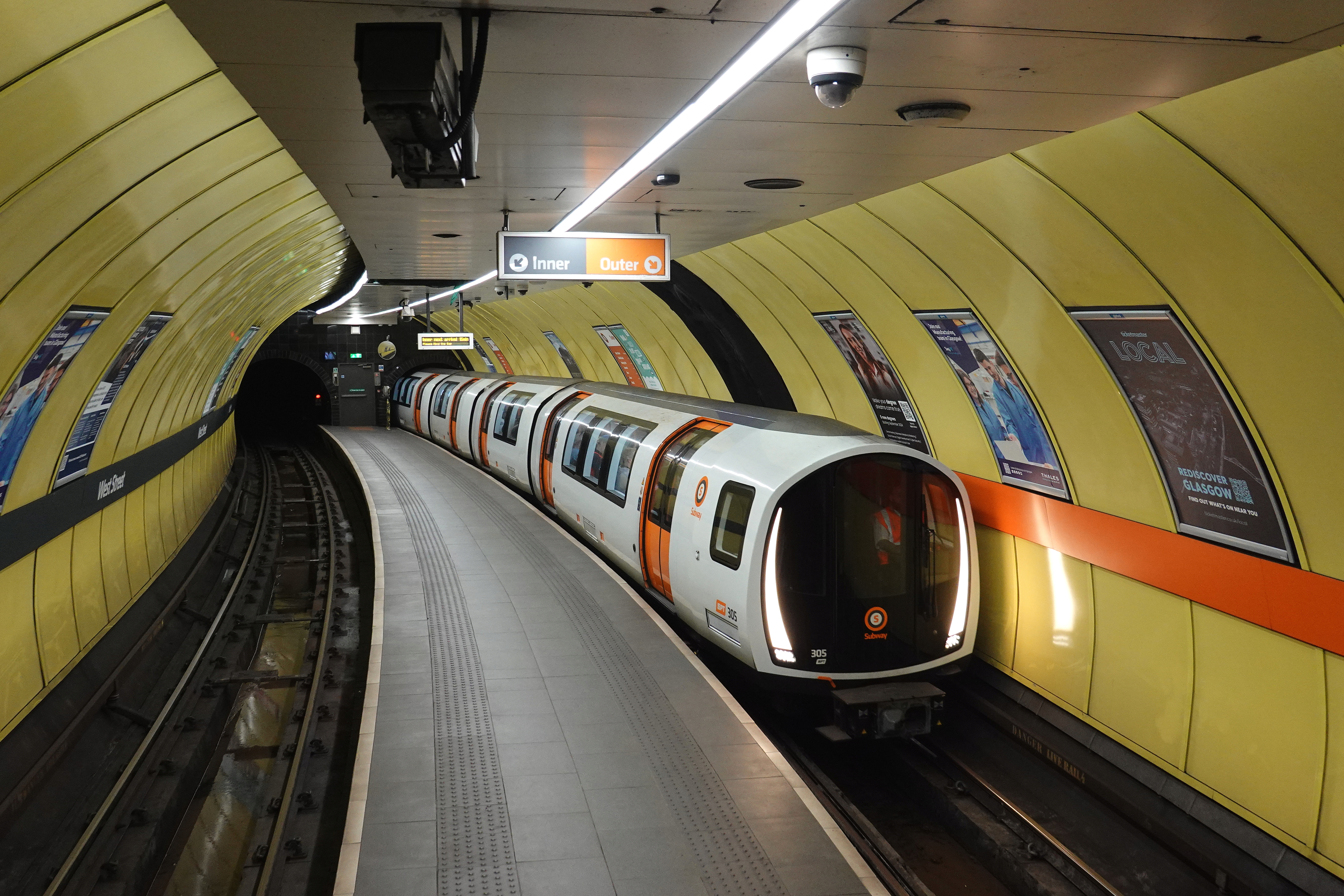
Glasgow Subway, one of the oldest metro systems in the world

=== Cross border services ===
The main cross border services in Scotland are:

- The West Coast Main Line – operated by Avanti West Coast and TransPennine Express
  - Services from Edinburgh Waverley, Glasgow Central) and Motherwell to Manchester Airport, Birmingham New Street and London Euston
- East Coast Main Line – operated by London North Eastern Railway
  - Services from Inverness, Aberdeen, Glasgow Central and Edinburgh Waverley to London King's Cross
- Cross Country Route – operated by CrossCountry
  - Services from Aberdeen, Dundee, Glasgow Central and Edinburgh Waverley to Leeds, Sheffield, Derby, Birmingham New Street, Bristol Temple Meads, Exeter St Davids, Plymouth and Penzance
- Caledonian Sleeper – overnight sleeper services
  - Services from Inverness, Aberdeen, Fort William, Glasgow Central and Edinburgh Waverley to London Euston
- Glasgow South Western Line – operated by ScotRail
  - Services linking Carlisle, Dumfries, Kilmarnock, Glasgow Central, Paisley, Troon (for P&O Ferries to Larne), Ayr and Stranraer (with links by bus from the two latter stations to Cairnryan, for P&O Ferries to Larne or Stena Line to Belfast).

=== Scottish services ===
Within Scotland, 94% of passenger service trains are operated by ScotRail, with the remaining 6% being cross border. Up until 2005, services within the former Strathclyde Regional Council area were provided by SPT in partnership with British Rail and after the Privatisation of British Rail the ScotRail franchise holder. However after the implementation of the Transport (Scotland) Act 2005, SPT is no longer involved in the running of the rail network.

=== Glasgow Subway ===
The Glasgow Subway is the only underground system in Scotland. It opened on 14 December 1896, making it the third-oldest underground network in the world after the Budapest Metro and the London Underground. It is owned and operated by Strathclyde Partnership for Transport.

=== Trams and light rail ===
Edinburgh Trams opened on 31 May 2014. It is the only system currently in operation in Scotland, although Aberdeen, Dundee, Dunfermline, Edinburgh and Glasgow formerly had extensive networks.

=== Rail freight ===
The Scottish rail network is also used by freight trains. As of December 2023, 4 million tonnes of freight was transported by rail in Scotland.

== Road network ==
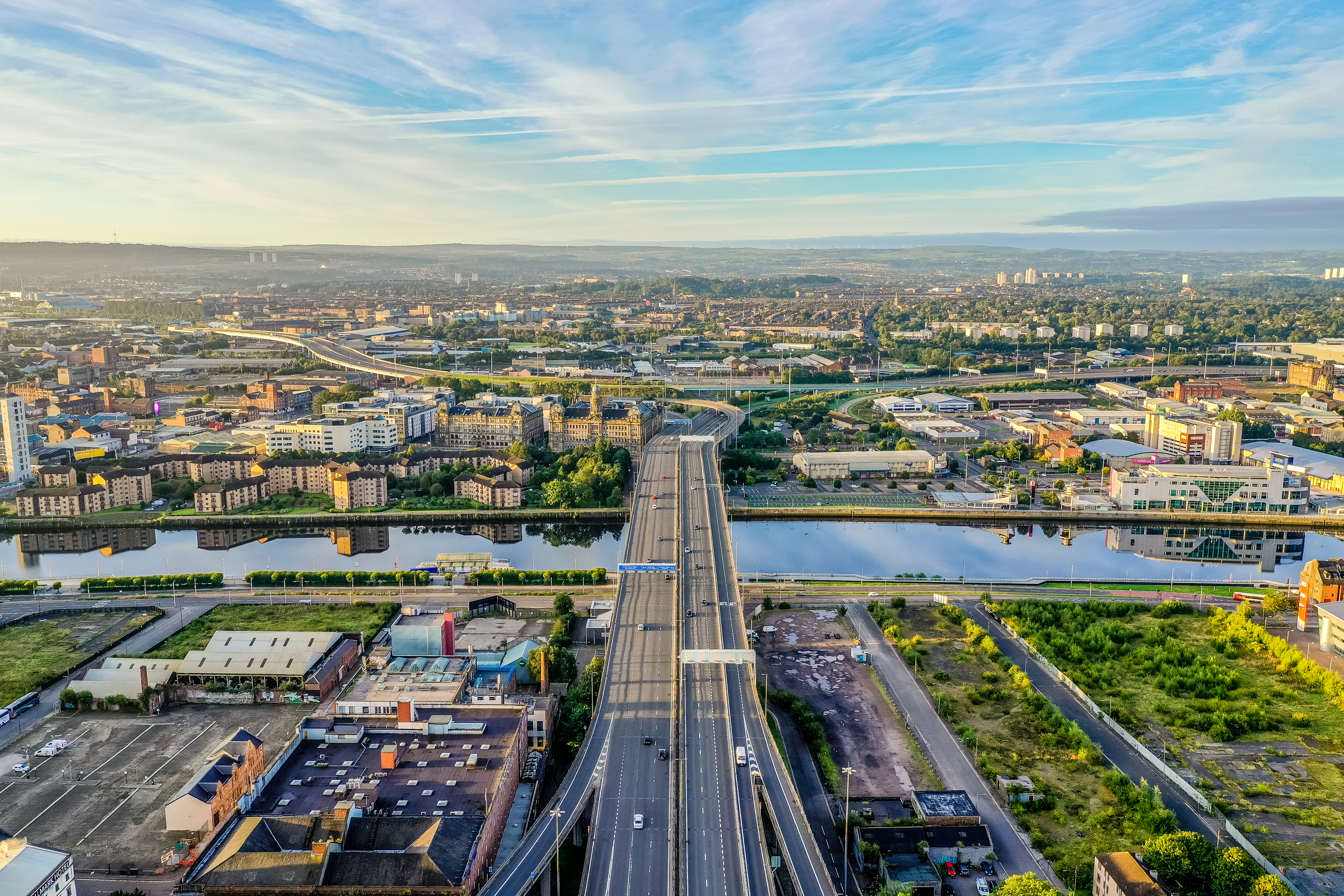
The M8 is the busiest motorway in Scotland.

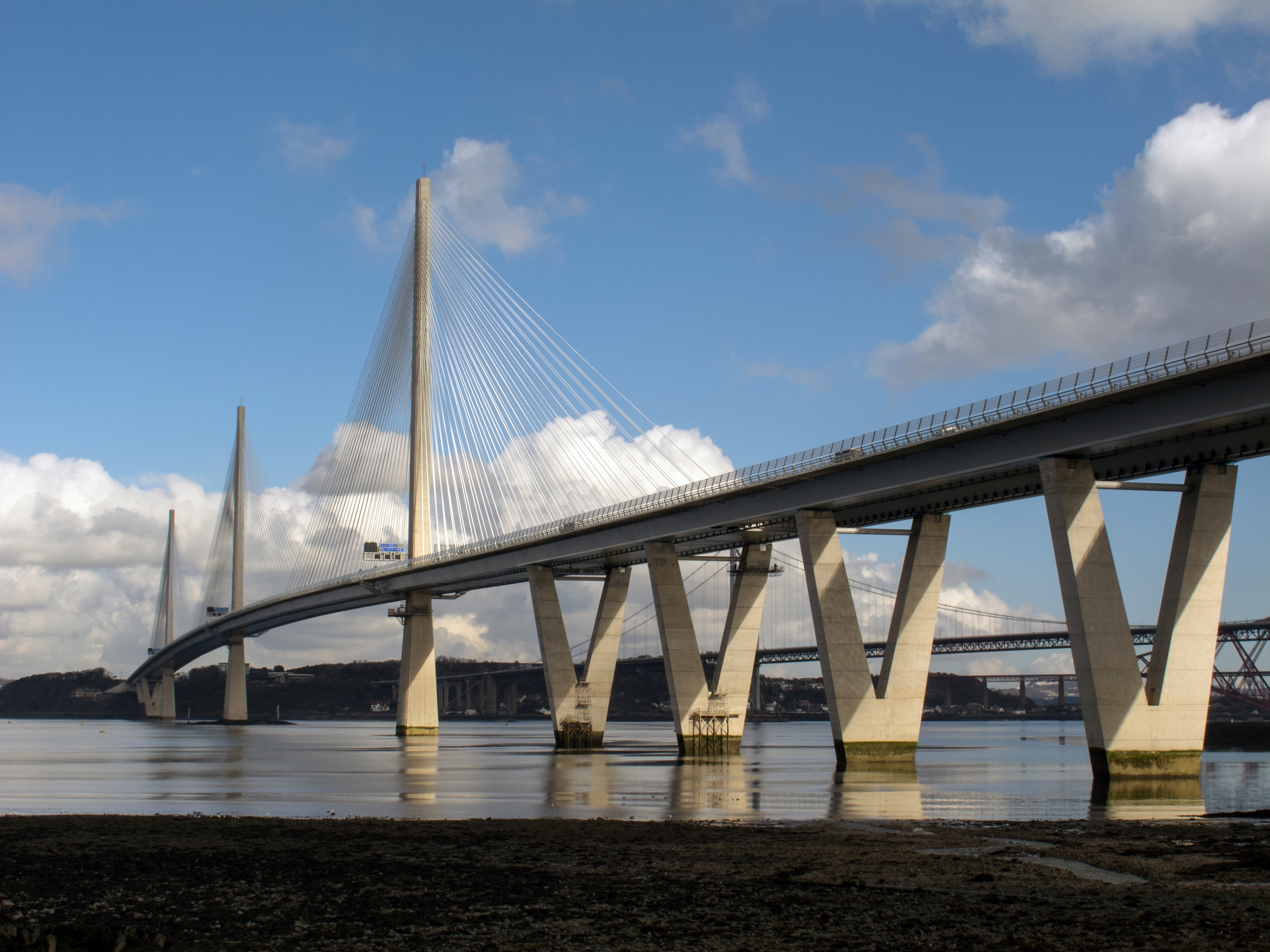
The Queensferry Crossing carries the M90 motorway across the Firth of Forth.

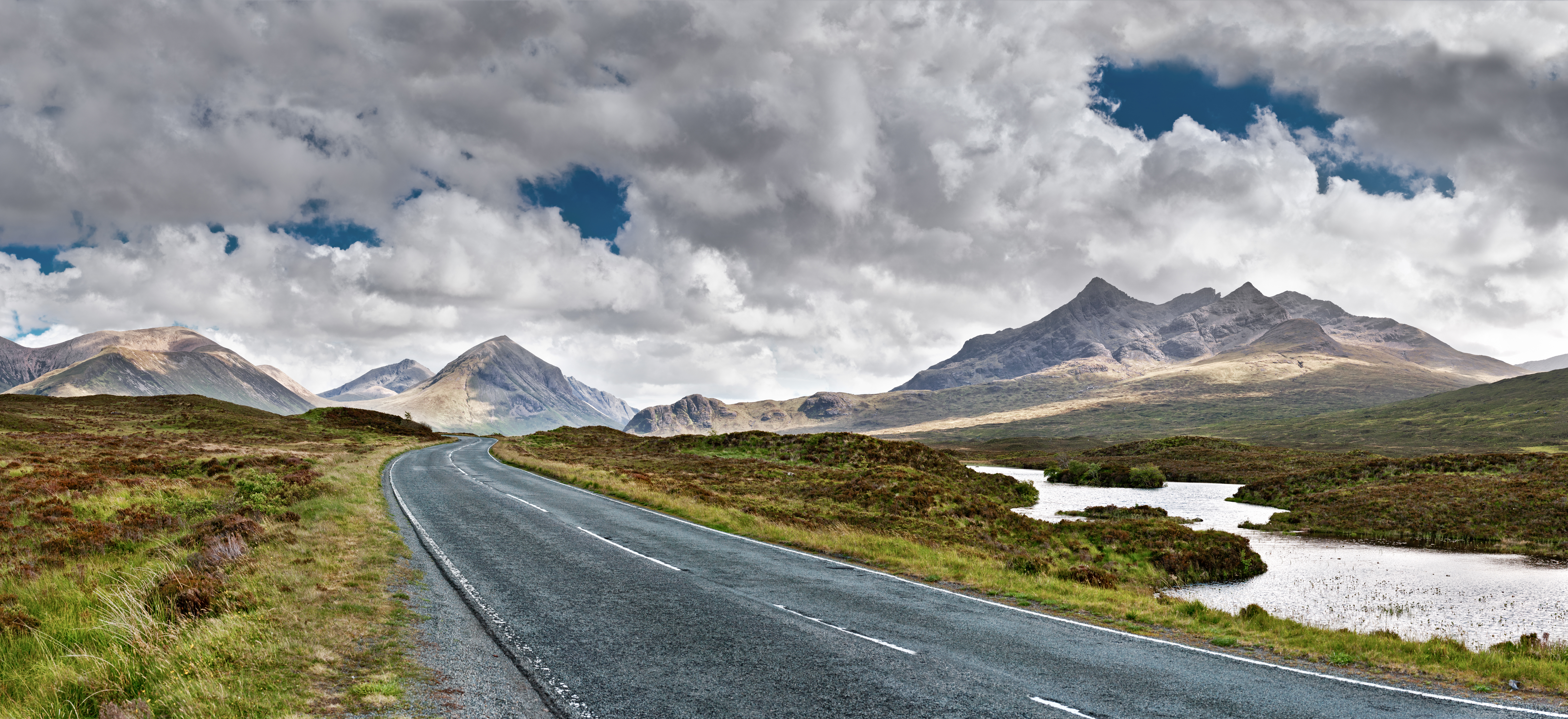
The A863 road on the Isle of Skye

=== Motorways ===
Scotland has an extensive road network throughout the country. The motorway network is concentrated in the Central belt, with trunk roads (A roads) connecting the rest of the country.

Major routes in Scotland include:

- M74 motorway and A74(M) motorway between Glasgow and the M6 at Carlisle
- M77 motorway/A77 road between Glasgow, Kilmarnock, Ayr and Stranraer
- M9 motorway between Edinburgh and Bridge of Allan
- M8 motorway between Edinburgh, Glasgow and Greenock
- M80 motorway between Glasgow and Stirling
- M90 motorway between Edinburgh, Kinross and Perth
- A1 road between Edinburgh, Musselburgh, Haddington, Dunbar, Berwick and London
- A82 road between Glasgow, Crianlarich, Fort William and Inverness via Loch Lomond and The Trossachs and Loch Ness
- A9 road between Falkirk, Stirling, Perth, Pitlochry, Aviemore, Inverness, Golspie, Thurso and Scrabster ferry terminal, (connecting to the NorthLink Ferries ferry to Stromness, Orkney) via The Cairngorms
- A90 road between Edinburgh, Perth, Dundee, Forfar, Stonehaven, Aberdeen, Peterhead and Fraserburgh

=== Traffic ===
Within the large cities, roads become congested in peak hours. The M8 and M77 motorways become heavily congested in peak hours, especially around Glasgow where it travels through the heart of the city. The main congestion hotspots are in Glasgow City Centre around the Kingston Bridge where a large amount of traffic leaves and enter the road. Also further down the road traffic joining at Hillington Estate and Braehead Shopping Centre near Glasgow Airport can cause hold-ups. Traffic is also extremely heavy between Glasgow and Edinburgh at all times, however rarely comes to a standstill.

=== Road construction ===
An extension to the M9 spur to link with the A90 at the Forth Bridge recently opened, as did the new Clackmannanshire Bridge over the Firth of Forth. A controversial extension to the M74 motorway through the southside of Glasgow was also completed in 2011. The road, first proposed in the 1960s, was due to open in 2008. However, legal action against the road was brought by environmental group Friends of the Earth. The action ultimately failed; however, the motorway has widespread opposition after ministers over-ruled the Local Public Inquiry held into the project which recommended that the road not be built, as it would be unable to substantially reduce congestion and would lead to more vehicles and pollution in the area. The Scottish Ministers voted for the road, believing that it would regenerate the inner city of Glasgow's Southside and bring economic benefits to Renfrewshire, Inverclyde and the Southside of Glasgow. Construction cost was estimated at £575 million, and it was Scotland's biggest roads project to date, as well as being the first motorway to be built in a British urban area for decades.

Motorway symbol	Motorways of Scotland
M73 – M74 – M77 – M8 – M80 – M876 – M898 – M9 – M90
A-roads with motorway restrictions
A74(M) – A823(M)

== Bus travel ==
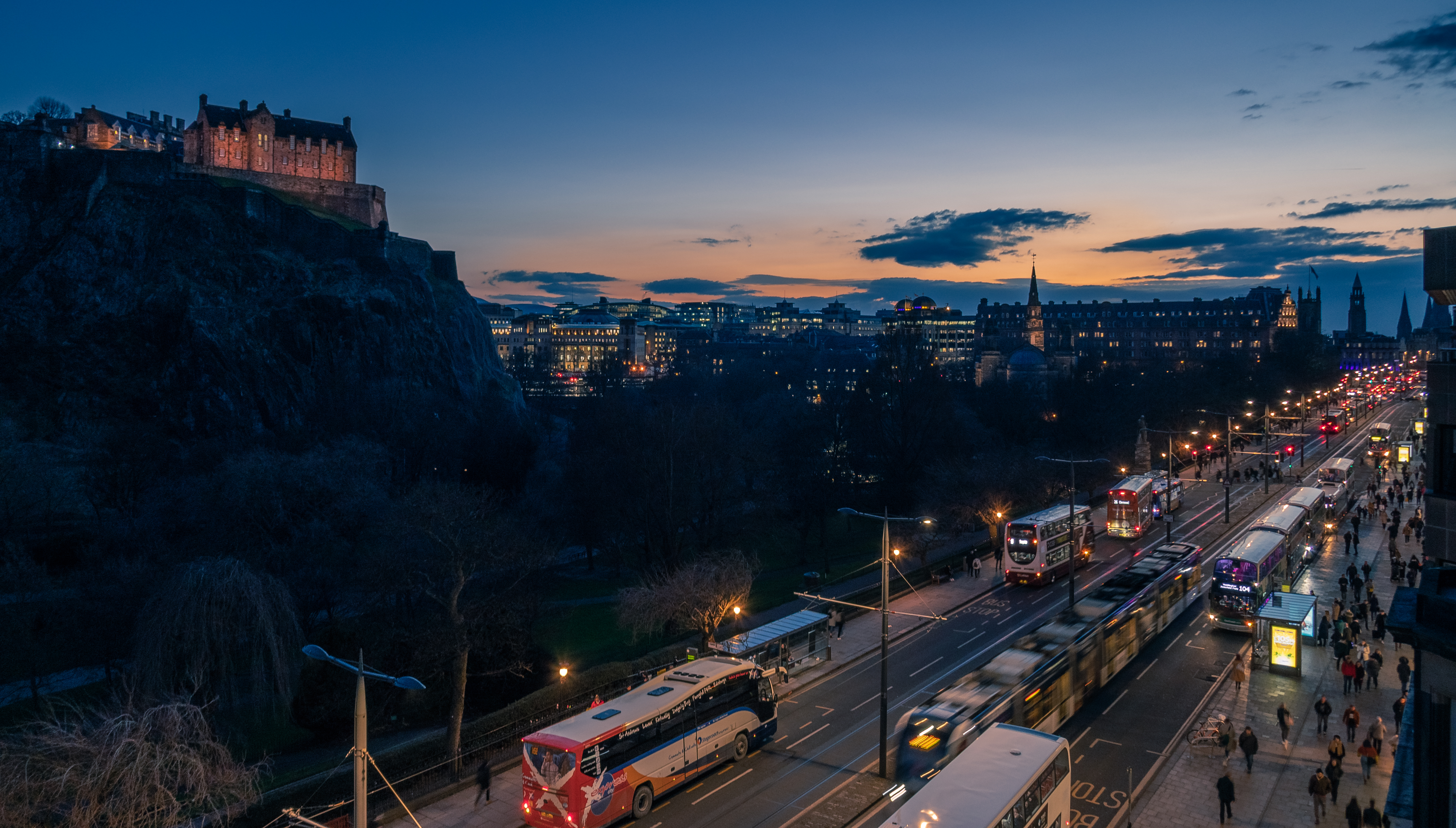
Buses in Edinburgh city centre, passing Edinburgh Castle

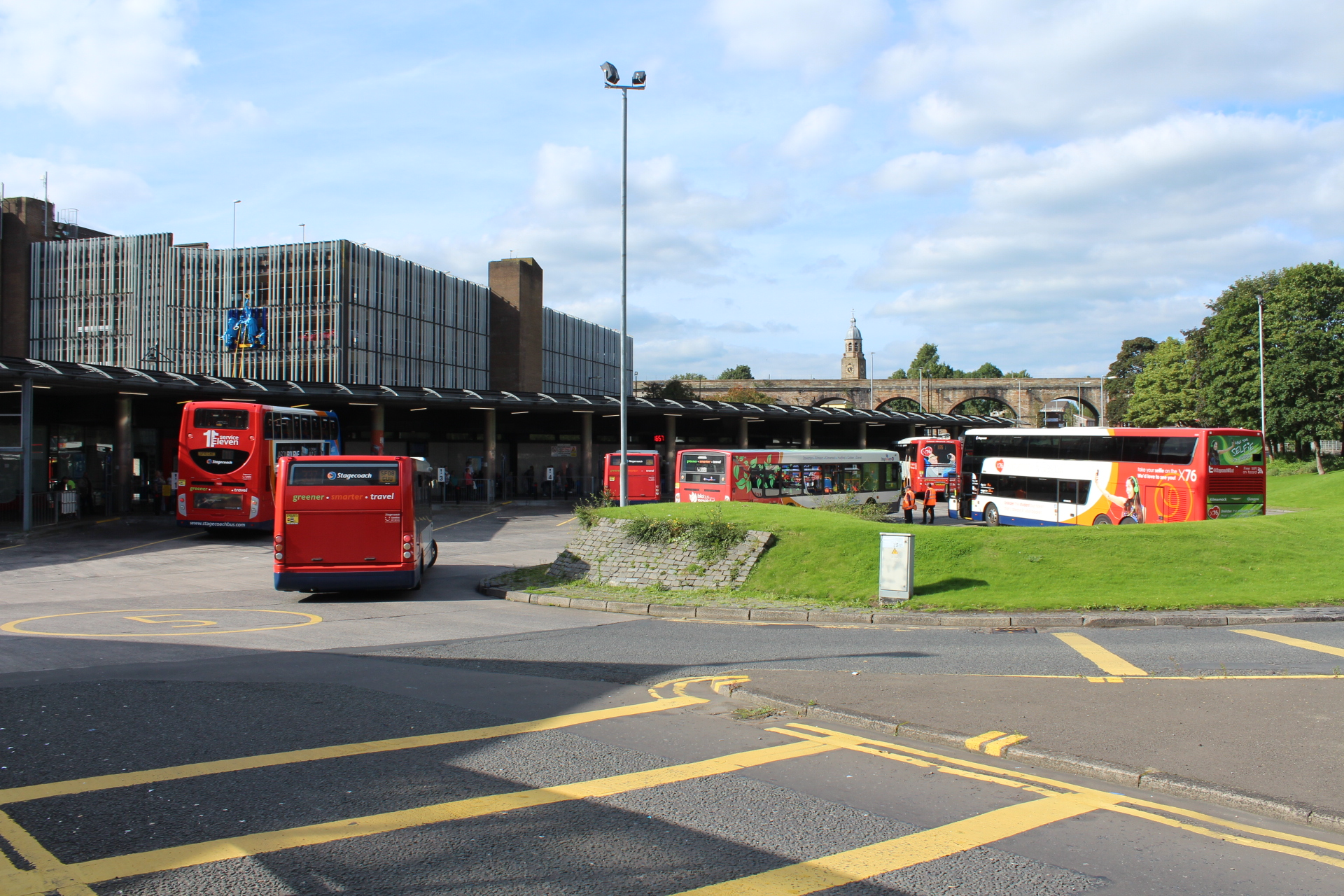
Buses, operated by Stagecoach, at Kilmarnock bus station

Scotland is covered by a large bus network throughout many towns, cities and rural areas. It is estimated that 95% of the population live within 5 minutes walk of a bus stop. National and international buses often operate out of main bus stations in the cities, such as Buchanan bus station in Glasgow and Edinburgh bus station.

Scottish Citylink and Megabus are the two principal long-distance coach operators within Scotland, and currently operating together as a joint venture. However, the deal is being monitored by the competition commission to ensure that it does not unfairly damage long-distance bus travel in Scotland. National Express provide coach links with cities in England and Wales.

FirstGroup and Stagecoach Group are two large public transport companies which are based in Scotland at Aberdeen and Perth, respectively, and both operate a number of local and regional services.

Numerous local independent operators also run bus services throughout Scotland as well as Lothian Buses, Edinburgh's largest bus operator and Scotland's last council-run bus company.

Scotland's bus network, like that of Great Britain outside London, is deregulated following an act of UK Parliament in 1986. This broke up the former national and city bus companies, formerly run by the local authorities since the 1930s, into private companies. The act also allowed buses to be operated by private companies and individuals for profit, provided they met the financial, background and maintenance requirements to qualify for a licence, set down by Vehicle & Operator Services Agency who administrate the system. A Public Service Vehicle Licence is then granted to allow a specified number of vehicles to be operated. Using this licence firms can then register their routes with the Local Traffic Commissioner for the area, in this case Scotland, indicating the exact route to be operated as well as the times and dates their buses will run. No requirements are set as to when and what routes buses can run, their age and what fares can be charged-this is decided by companies, often by the profitability of the route. Currently only one bus company, Lothian Buses in Edinburgh, remains under ownership and control of local councils in Lothian and Edinburgh.

On 31 January 2022, free bus travel was introduced across Scotland for everyone aged under 22.

== Water ==
=== Ferries ===
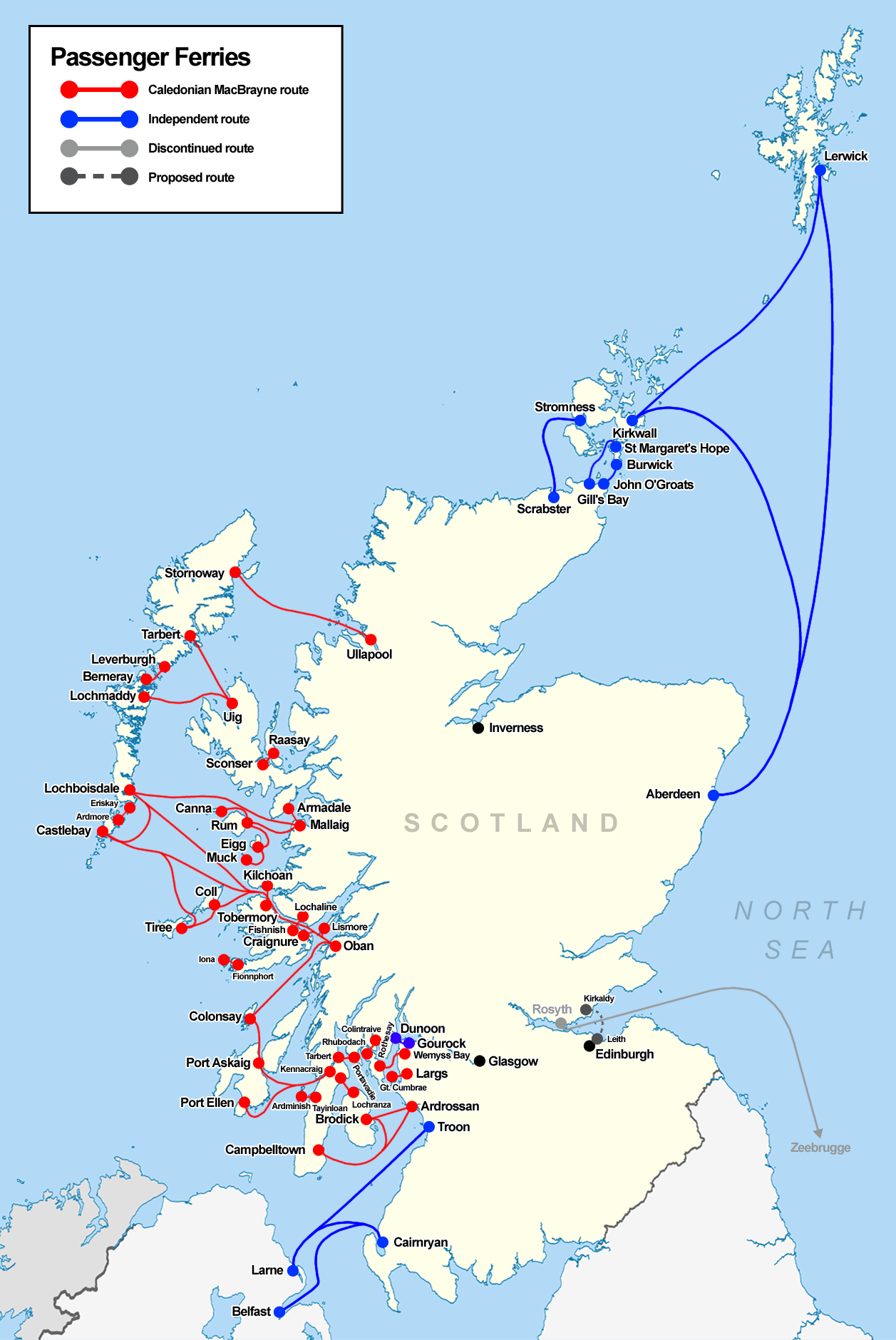
Map of ferry services in Scotland

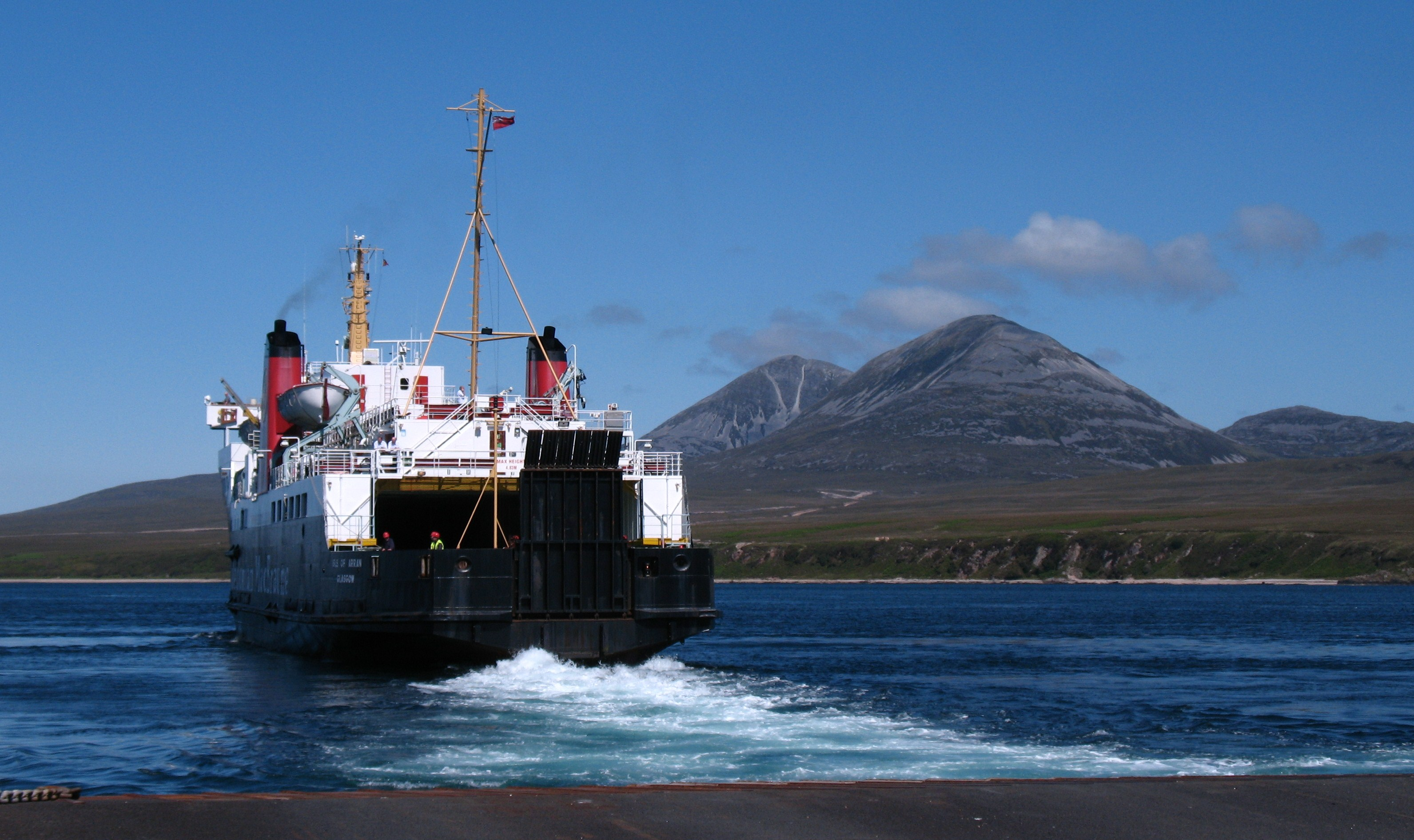
MV Isle of Arran, operated by Caledonian MacBrayne, departing Port Askaig

As Scotland is made up of several hundred islands, water has always been an important transport route for passengers and freight, particularly in the remote communities of the Hebrides.

Caledonian MacBrayne, a subsidiary of David MacBrayne, is owned by the Scottish Government. A fleet of 37 ferries serve a 52 ports and 49 routes on the ferry network in Scotland, with 5.3 million passengers travelling on the Caledonian MacBrayne ferry network in 2018. The ferry network in Scotland is faced with issues, in part due to the ageing fleet of the Caledonian MacBrayne network. The average age of a Caledonian MacBrayne vessel in 2023 was 40 years old, with MV Isle of Arran having been built in 1983, and serves the busiest route (Ardrossan–Brodick) in Scotland's ferry network.

The ferry network is often met with criticism by those living and working in Scotland's island communities, citing delays and cancellations as a reason for loss of earnings and impacting island communities local economies. Construction of two replacement vessels, MV Glen Sannox (2017) and "Hull 802" were awarded to Ferguson Marine in 2015, however, have faced major delays and budget overspending, trebling to £293 million.

In an attempt to deal with the political scandal arising from the ferry fiasco, the Scottish Government nationalised the Ferguson Marine shipyard, which, at the time of Scottish Government nationalisation, had debts of £70 million.

There are several ferry companies operating in Scotland including:

- Caledonian MacBrayne, a publicly owned ferry company with routes linking the mainland to all the major islands of the West Coast
- NorthLink Ferries, currently run by Serco, provides the lifeline and Scottish Government subsidised services to the Orkney Islands and Shetland Islands, linking them with Aberdeen and Scrabster
- Pentland Ferries, car and passenger ferries from Gills Bay (Scottish Mainland) to St. Margaret's Hope (Orkney).
- Stena Line link Cairnryan to the Belfast in Northern Ireland
- P&O provide a link to Larne in Northern Ireland from Cairnryan
- Western Ferries based in Hunters Quay, Argyll, operates on the Firth of Clyde, providing a frequent vehicle link between Hunters Quay, Cowal and McInroy's Point, Gourock, Inverclyde.
- SIC Ferries, owned by the Shetland Islands Council provide inter-island services in Shetland
- Orkney Islands Council own Orkney Ferries, which provides inter-island services in Orkney

The Rosyth – Zeebrugge ferry service (freight only since 2010), formerly operated by DFDS, Superfast Ferries and Norfolkline, ceased operation in 2018. The ferry to Gothenburg, Sweden, from Newcastle (actually North Shields) in northern England (currently run by the Danish company DFDS Seaways), ceased at the end of October 2006. This service was a key route for Scottish tourist traffic from Sweden and Norway. The company cited high fuel prices and new competition from low-cost air services, especially Ryanair (which now flies to Glasgow Prestwick and London Stansted from Gothenburg City Airport), as being the cause. DFDS Seaways' sister company, DFDS Tor Line, will continue to run scheduled freight ships between Gothenburg and several English ports, including Newcastle, and these have limited capacity for passengers, but not private vehicles. The Newcastle–Kristiansand, Norway, route has however recently been cancelled.

=== Waterways ===
Scotland never had an extensive canal network. The Forth and Clyde Canal, Union Canal and the Caledonian Canal were some of the most important, but went into decline after the growth of the railways. They are now being reopened and restored primarily for leisure use.

== Air transport ==
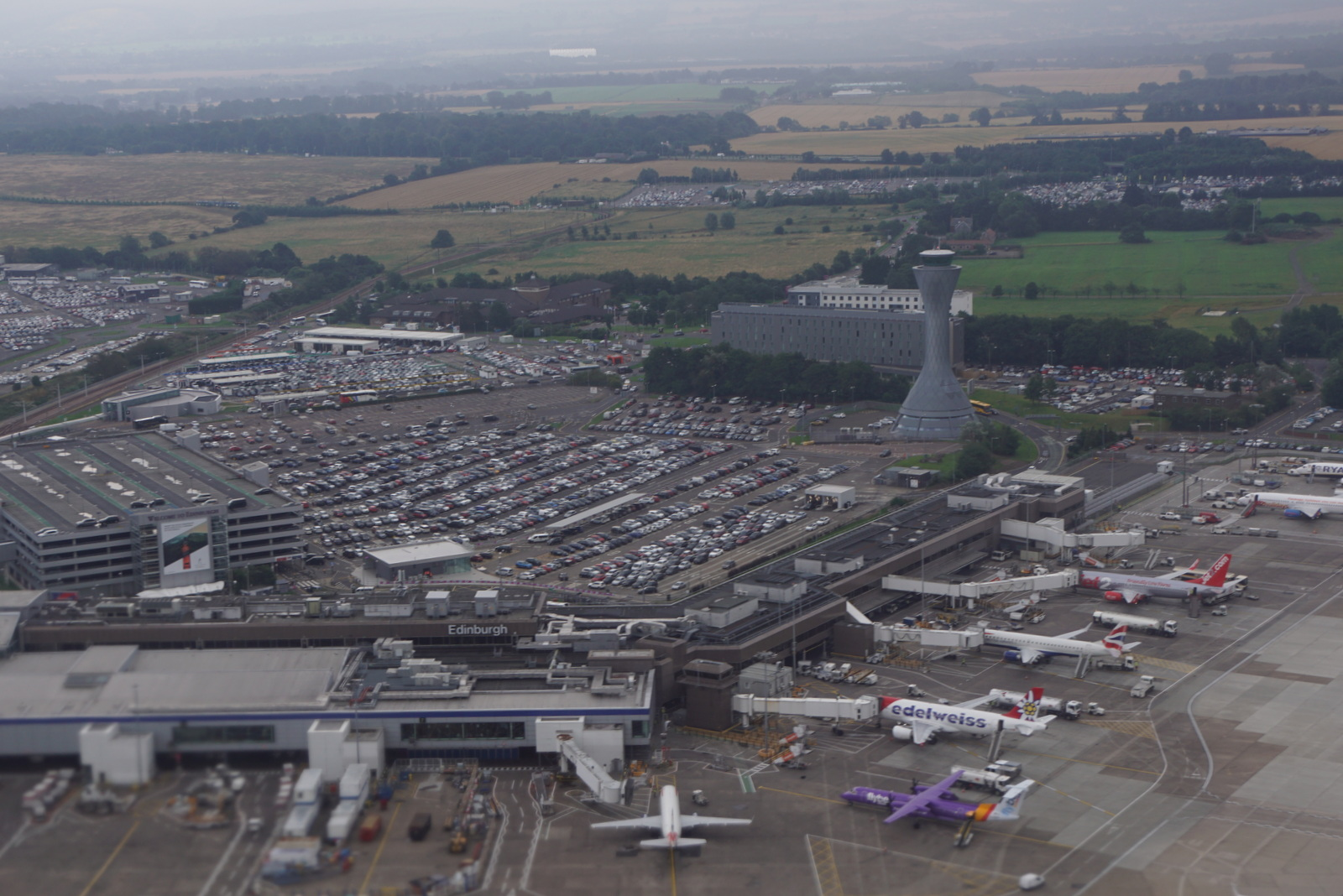
Edinburgh Airport is Scotland's busiest airport by passenger numbers, with over 14.4 million passengers in 2023.

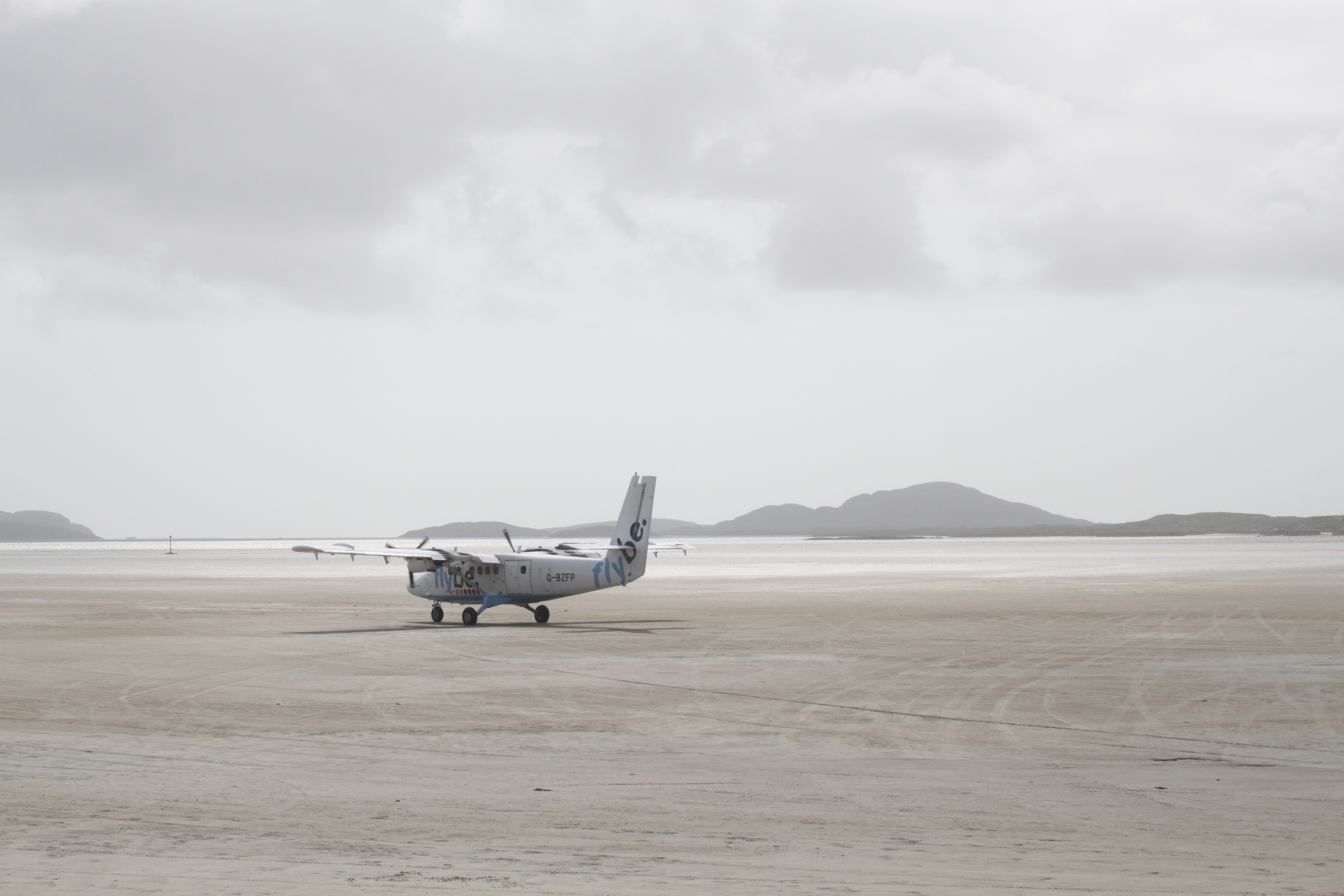
Barra Airport is the only airport in the world to use a tidal beach as its runway.

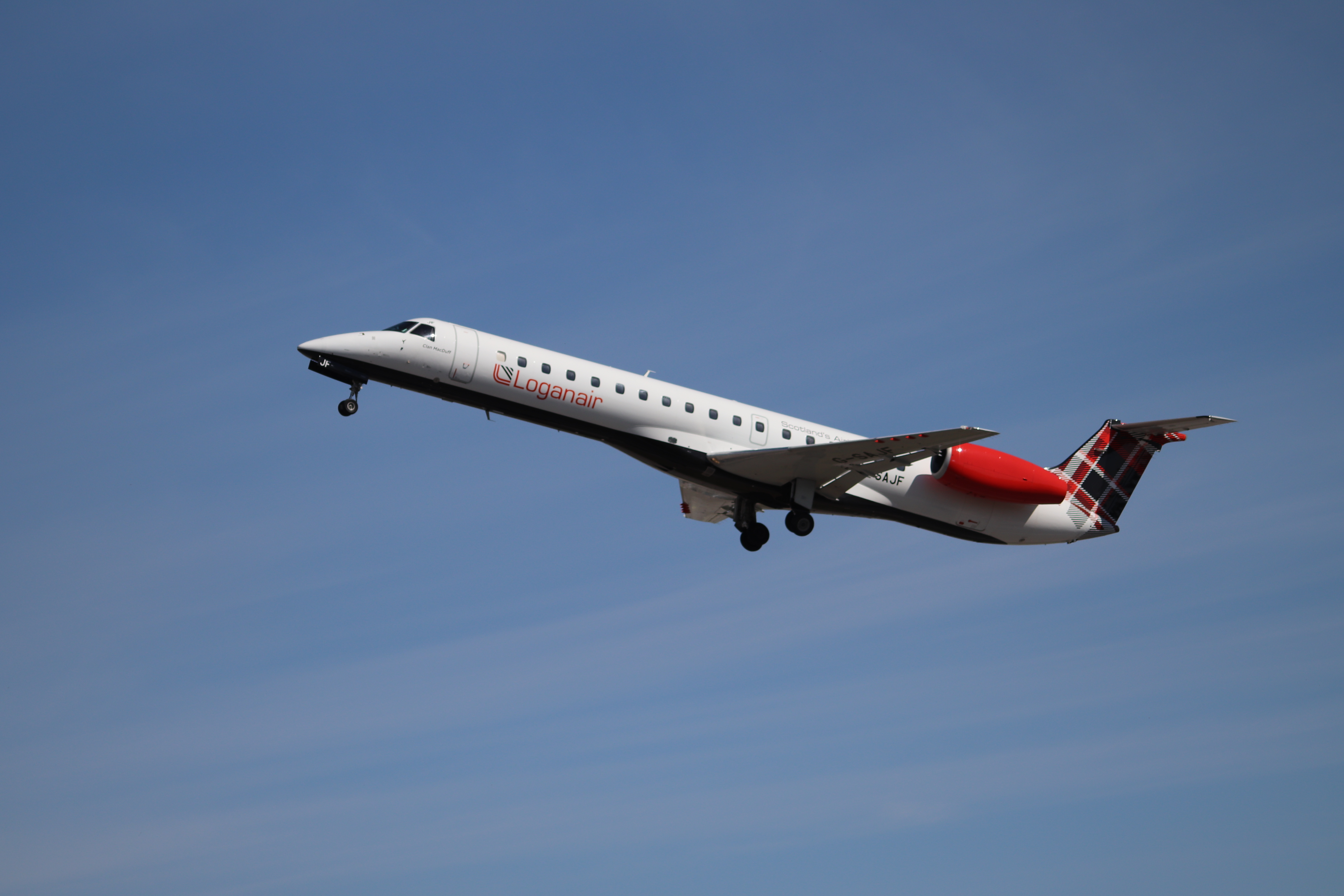
Loganair is branded as Scotland's Airline.

Air transport in Scotland is responsible for 0.3% of Scottish Gross Value Added (GVA) (roughly £400 million). In 2019, 3.5 million international inbound visits to Scotland occurred, with a total visitor spending being estimated £2.5 billion. Of the 3.5 million inbound visits, 1.9 million used Scottish airports. The Scottish Government has passed a bill in the Scottish Parliament to replace the UK-wide Air Passenger Duty with a Air Departure Tax which would apply fully and solely to Scotland.

Edinburgh Airport is the busiest airport in Scotland by passenger numbers, and is a major transatlantic gateway for Scotland. In 2023, Edinburgh Airport handled in excess of 14 million passengers, a 28% increase from recorded passenger numbers in 2022. Thirty-five airlines fly to 152 international destinations from Edinburgh Airport, with the airport handling 115,000 aircraft movements in 2023. The countries second largest airport by passenger numbers is Glasgow Airport, which handles over 7 million passengers on an annual basis. A total of 20 airlines serve Glasgow Airport, flying to over 100 international destinations.

Glasgow Prestwick Airport in Prestwick, South Ayrshire, was the only airport in Scotland to operate a transatlantic link for a considerable period of time before the establishment of Scotland's other larger airports, such as Aberdeen, Edinburgh and Glasgow. Aberdeen Airport is one of Europe's busiest commercial heliports due to its proximity to the North Sea and its role in supporting the North Sea oil and gas industry. The open skies policy (1990) allowed passengers to fly direct to international countries without the need to change flights at airports such as London Heathrow or London Gatwick. British Airways, EasyJet, Jet2 and Ryanair operate the majority of flights between Scotland and other major UK and European airports.

Highlands and Islands Airports operates eleven airports across the Highlands, Orkney, Shetland and the Western Isles, which are primarily used for short distance, public service operations, although Inverness Airport has a number of scheduled flights to destinations across the UK and mainland Europe. Inverness Airport is largely considered as the "air gateway" for the Scottish Highland area and Scotland's islands. It is the largest of the ten airports serving the Highlands and Islands region, handling more than 330 flights per week to both Scottish and UK-wide destinations in 2009.

A number of smaller airports across Scotland provide a mixture of commercial and military flights. Smaller airports of the country include Barra Airport, Benbecula Airport, Campbeltown Airport, Coll Airport, Colonsay Airport, Dundee Airport, Eday Airport, Fair Isle Airport, Foula Airport, Islay Airport, Tingwall Airport, North Ronaldsay Airport, Oban Airport, Papa Stour Airstrip, Papa Westray Airport, Sanday Airport, Stornoway Airport, Stronsay Airport, Sumburgh Airport, Tiree Airport, Westray Airport and Wick Airport. Islay Airport is known as the "Queen of the Hebrides" and is connected to the Scottish mainland with flights to Glasgow operated by British Airways.

Scotland has five international airports – Aberdeen, Edinburgh, Glasgow, Glagow Prestwick and Inverness – with scheduled services, operating to Europe, North America and Asia, as well domestic services to England, Northern Ireland and Wales. There are currently four Scottish-based airlines:

- Air Charter Scotland
- Directflight
- Hebridean Air Services
- Loganair

=== Airports in Scotland ===
Location	County	ICAO	IATA	Airport name	Usage	Rwy Length		Surface	Elevation (m)
Location	County	ICAO	IATA	Airport name	Usage	(m)	(ft)	Surface	Elevation (m)
Aberdeen	Aberdeen	EGPD	ABZ	Aberdeen Airport	Public	1,953	6,407	Asphalt	66
Ardchattan and Muckairn	Argyll and Bute	EGEO	OBN	Oban Airport	Public	1,240	4,068	Asphalt	7
Baltasound	Shetland	EGPW	UNT	Unst Airport	Public	640	2,100	Asphalt	
Benbecula	Na h-Eileanan Siar	EGPL	BEB	Benbecula Airport	Public	1,836	6,023	Asphalt	6
Barra	Na h-Eileanan Siar	EGPR	BRR	Barra Airport	Public	846	2,776	Sand	2
Campbeltown	Argyll and Bute	EGEC	CAL	Campbeltown Airport (RAF Machrihanish)	Public	3,049	10,003	Asphalt	13
Coll	Argyll and Bute	EGEL	COL	Coll Airport	Public	500	1,640	Asphalt	6
Colonsay and Oronsay	Argyll and Bute	EGEY	CSA	Colonsay Airport	Public	501	1,644	Asphalt	13
North Ronaldsay	Orkney	EGEN	NRL	North Ronaldsay Airport	Public	467	1,532	Graded hardcore	17
Cumbernauld	North Lanarkshire	EGPG		Cumbernauld Airport	Public	820	2,690	Asphalt	107
Dalcross	Highland	EGPE	INV	Inverness Airport	Public	1,887	6,191	Asphalt	9
Dundee	Dundee	EGPN	DND	Dundee Airport	Public	1,400	4,593	Asphalt	5
Dunrossness	Shetland	EGPB	LSI	Sumburgh Airport	Public	1,426	4,678	Asphalt	6
Eday	Orkney	EGED	EOI	Eday Airport	Public	467	1,532	Graded hardcore	6
Edinburgh	Edinburgh	EGPH	EDI	Edinburgh Airport	Public	2,560	8,399	Asphalt	41
Fair Isle	Shetland	EGEF	FIE	Fair Isle Airport	Private	486	1,594	Gravel	68
Foula	Shetland		FOA	Foula Airfield		457	1,500	Gravel	
Islay	Argyll and Bute	EGPI	ILY	Islay Airport	Public	1,545	5,068	Asphalt	17
Kinglassie	Fife	EGPJ		Fife Airport	Public	700	2,297	Asphalt	
Kinloss	Moray	EGQK	FSS	Kinloss Barracks	Military	2,311	7,582	Asphalt	
Sanday	Orkney	EGES	NDY	Sanday Airport	Public	467	1,532	Graded hardcore	20
Leuchars	Fife	EGQL	ADX	Leuchars Station	Military	2,588	8,491	Asphalt	
Lossiemouth	Moray	EGQS	LMO	RAF Lossiemouth	Military	2,749	9,019	Asphalt	
Out Skerries	Shetland		OUK	Out Skerries Airport					
Papa Stour	Shetland		PSV	Papa Stour Airport	Public	442	1,450	Gravel	
Papa Westray	Orkney	EGEP	PPW	Papa Westray Airport	Public	469	1,532	Graded hardcore	28
Paisley	Renfrewshire	EGPF	GLA	Glasgow Airport	Public	2,658	8,720	Asphalt	8
Prestwick	South Ayrshire	EGPK	PIK	Glasgow Prestwick Airport	Public	2,987	9,799	Concrete/asphalt	20
Mainland, Orkney	Orkney	EGPA	KOI	Kirkwall Airport	Public	1,428	4,685	Asphalt	18
Scone	Perth and Kinross	EGPT	PSL	Perth Airport	Public	853	2,799	Asphalt	
Stornoway	Na h-Eileanan Siar	EGPO	SYY	Stornoway Airport	Public	2,200	7,218	Asphalt	8
Ashaig	Highland	EGEI	SKL	Broadford Airfield	Public	793	2,602	Grass	
Stronsay	Orkney	EGER	SOY	Stronsay Airport	Public	515	1,690	Graded hardcore	12
Tingwall	Shetland	EGET	LWK	Tingwall Airport	Public	764	2,507	Asphalt	14
Tiree	Argyll and Bute	EGPU	TRE	Tiree Airport	Public	1,472	4,829	Asphalt	
Westray	Orkney	EGEW	WRY	Westray Airport	Public	467	1,532	Gravel	9
Whalsay	Shetland	EGEH	WHS	Whalsay Airstrip	Public	457	1,499	Asphalt	
Wick	Highland	EGPC	WIC	Wick Airport	Public	1,825	5,988	Asphalt	

== See also ==
- List of Tramways in Scotland
- NaPTAN
- Rail transport in Great Britain
- Scotch gauge
- Transport in Aberdeen
- Transport in Edinburgh
- Transport in Glasgow
- Transport in the United Kingdom
  - Transport in England
  - Transport in Wales
  - Transport in Northern Ireland
- Transport Scotland
