= Highland Airways =

Scottish regional airline

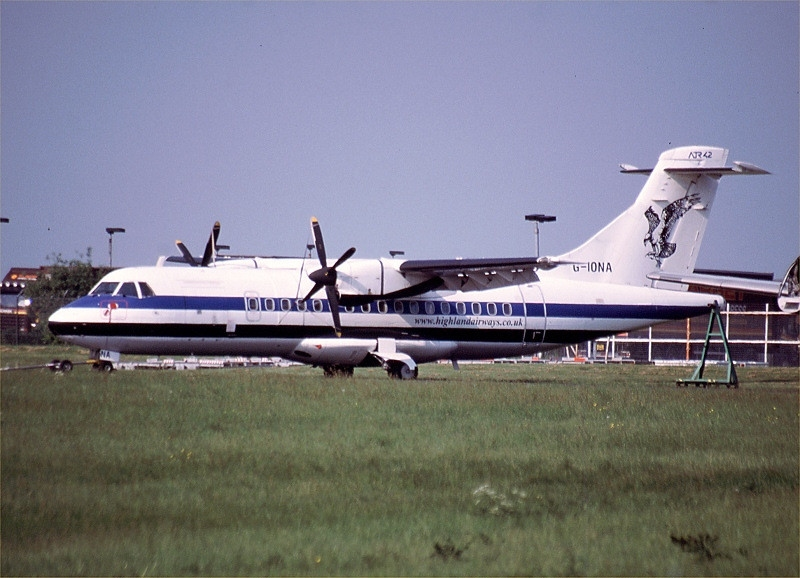
- ATR 42
IATA	ICAO	Call sign
8H	HWY	HIWAY
- Founded: 1991 (as Air Alba)
- Commenced operations: September 2001 (as Highland Airways)
- Ceased operations: 24 March 2010
- Operating bases: Inverness Airport
- Fleet size: 11
- Destinations: 10 (all now suspended)
- Headquarters: Inverness Airport, Scotland
- Key people: Alan Mossman (CEO); Anne Maclennan (Charter Manager)

Highland Airways Ltd. was an airline based in Inverness, Scotland. It ceased trading on 24 March 2010 after failing to secure new investment. The airline operated passenger and freight charters as well as scheduled services from its main base at Inverness Airport. Other services included newspaper distribution to the northern and Western Isles and, until recently, charter services for corporate clients. Highland Airways was under talks for a buyout by Perth-based, Air Charter Scotland. Aircraft were also based at Cardiff Airport.

The company held a United Kingdom Civil Aviation Authority Type A Operating Licence. It was permitted to carry passengers, cargo and mail on aircraft with 20 or more seats.

== History ==
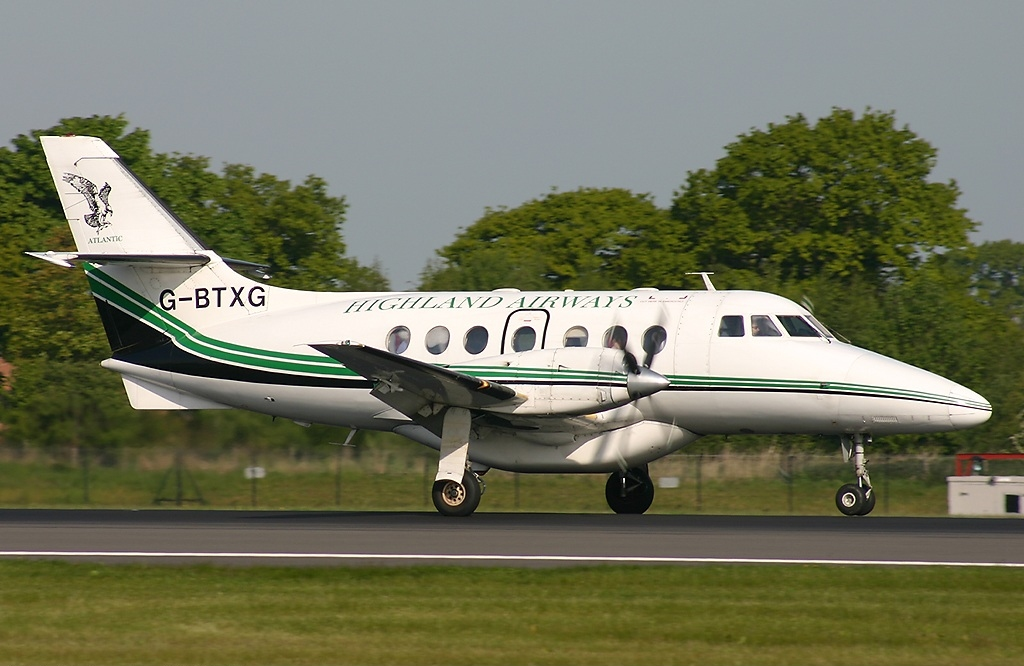
British Aerospace Jetstream

The airline was established and started operations in 1991. It was founded as Air Alba, operating for four years as a flying school. It was renamed Highland Airways in February 1997 in recognition of Captain Ted Fresson, the man who pioneered flight in the area and founded the original Highland Airways. When the newspaper industry relocated their charter departure point for Scottish islands to Inverness in 1998, Highland won the contract to provide two BAe Jetstream 31 aircraft per day for this task. One of these aircraft also carried business and leisure passengers on its "Island hopper" service as well as freight.

Highland also expanded into contract work for the oil industry based in Aberdeen during 1998. Highland aircraft facilitated crew changes, business delegations, emergency freight or technician movements for the industry, meaning Highland Airways aircraft were regular visitors to the west coast of Ireland, the Faroe Islands and destinations in Norway including Stavanger and Bergen. The airline also began operating corporate charter services, most notably for BAE Systems, providing a daily service between Glasgow and the company's Filton Aerodrome, as well as flights for financial companies, electronics, utilities, whisky and the public sector. Highland have largely moved away from oil industry work, and after recent concerns about the financial stability of the company the BAE contract has been terminated and is now operated by Eastern Airways.

General aviation and ground handling facilities were provided by Highland at Stornoway and Benbecula, servicing both the airline itself and other operators.

Experience with Jetstream and Cessna aircraft allowed the airline to occasionally carry out engineering work for third-party operators at its engineering facility in Inverness.

Highland also won a 5-year contract to operate, crew and maintain two Cessna F406 reconnaissance aircraft on behalf of the Scottish Fisheries Protection Agency. These aircraft were based in Inverness and wore SFPA markings.

In March 2007 Highland Airways underwent a management buyout from Atlantic Holdings led by A Mossman and had 100 employees (at January 2008). The buyout had been supported by an investment of £620,000 by the public Highlands and Islands Enterprise development agency.

Highland Airways operated an intra-Wales flight connecting the north (Anglesey Airport) to the south (Cardiff Airport). Highland operated a BN2 Islander aircraft from Oban to Coll, Colonsay and Tiree under a contract with Argyll and Bute Council

On 24 March 2010, the airline was placed into voluntary administration, and all flights were cancelled, with no further bookings being taken. Highland Airways said that PricewaterhouseCoopers was taking over operation of the airline, and planned to transfer the services operated by Highland Airways to new operators. Following its bankruptcy, it has been revealed that the airline's debts run to more than £3.2m. Highland Airways' creditors were owed £1.13m, which includes a claim for more than £50,000 from Argyll and Bute Council.

== Destinations ==
At the time of its closure in March 2010, Highland Airways operated services to the following scheduled destinations:

Country	City/region	Airport	Notes	Refs
Scotland	Benbecula	Benbecula Airport		
Scotland	Coll	Coll Airport		
Scotland	Colonsay	Colonsay Airport		
Scotland	Inverness	Inverness Airport	Hub	
Scotland	Oban	Oban Airport		
Scotland	Stornoway	Stornoway Airport		
Scotland	Tiree	Tiree Airport		
United Kingdom	Anglesey	Anglesey Airport		
United Kingdom	Cardiff	Cardiff Airport		

Service between Benbecula and Stornoway was under contract from Comhairle nan Eilean Siar.

== Fleet ==
The fleet consisted of the following eleven aircraft at the time of its closure in March 2010:

Aircraft	Number	Capacity
BAe Jetstream 31	8	19
BAe Jetstream 41	2	29
Britten-Norman Islander	1	8

== See also ==
- List of defunct airlines of the United Kingdom
