= Coll Airport =

Coll Island Airport
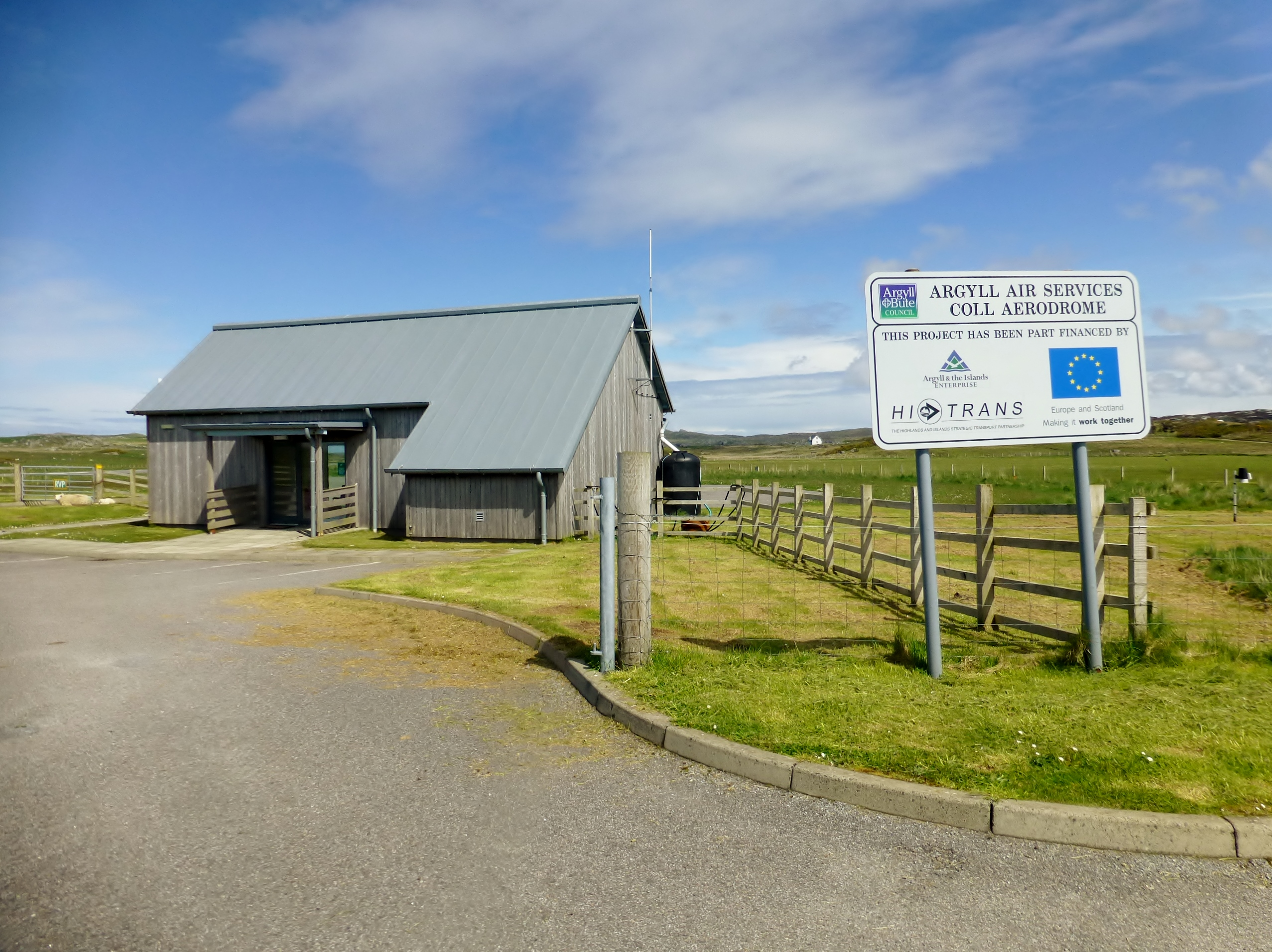
- IATA: COL; ICAO: EGEL

Summary
- Operator: Argyll and Bute Council
- Serves: Coll
- Location: Coll, Inner Hebrides, Scotland
- Elevation AMSL: 20 ft (6.1 m)
- Coordinates: 56°36′07″N 006°37′04″W

Map
- Location in Coll and Tiree Location in Argyll and Bute Location in Scotland

Runways
Direction	Length		Surface
Direction	m	ft	Surface
02/20	501	1,644	Asphalt
- Source: UK AIP at NATS

Coll Island Airport (IATA: COL, ICAO: EGEL) is located 6 miles (10 km) west–southwest of Arinagour on the island of Coll in the Inner Hebrides.

== History ==
Coll Airport was originally known as Ballard Farm, and opened in 1975, replacing the Totronald airfield. A brief closure in 1990, before re-opening the following year as an unlicensed air strip. In 2008, Coll Airport was formally opened with a hard surface runway. During the Covid-19 pandemic, and lockdown in the United Kingdom, Coll Airport was unable to utilise a fixed-wing air ambulance due to the length of runway. With no suitable helicopter landing pad, this meant the island had no access to Medivac.

Highland Airways who originally operated the route to Oban went into administration in 2010. Following the administration, Loganair operated the flights until 2023. Following a competitive tender process, Hebridean Air Services were appointed the new operator from 2024 of the PSO (Public service obligation) route with flights to Oban and Tiree using Britten-Norman BN-2 Islander aircraft.

== Airline and destinations ==
Airlines	Destinations
Hebridean Air Services	Colonsay, Oban, Tiree
