= Hebridean Air Services =

British airline

IATA	ICAO	Call sign
-	HBR	HEBRIDEAN
- Founded: 1995
- Hubs: Oban Airport
- Fleet size: 3
- Destinations: 6
- Parent company: Airtask Group Limited
- Headquarters: Inverness Airport
- Website: www.hebrideanair.co.uk

Hebridean Air Services is a small Scottish airline based in northern Scotland owned by Airtask Group Ltd. The airline flies charter, scenic, aerial photography and scheduled flights.

It is the only airline to operate a service between Oban, Coll, Tiree and Colonsay islands; routes subsidised by Argyll and Bute Council. Since April 2024 they have also operated flights between Benbecula and Stornoway subsidised by Comhairle nan Eilean Siar.

== Destinations ==
Country	Destination	Airport	Notes	Refs
United Kingdom (Scotland)	Benbecula	Benbecula Airport		
United Kingdom (Scotland)	Coll	Coll Airport		
United Kingdom (Scotland)	Colonsay	Colonsay Airport		
United Kingdom (Scotland)	Oban	Oban Airport	Base	
United Kingdom (Scotland)	Stornoway	Stornoway Airport		
United Kingdom (Scotland)	Tiree	Tiree Airport		

While the airline's primary base is Oban Airport, where scheduled flights are operated from, it also offers charter services to airports and airfields within Scotland. During the summer months they also offer scenic flights from both Oban and Stornoway.

== Fleet ==
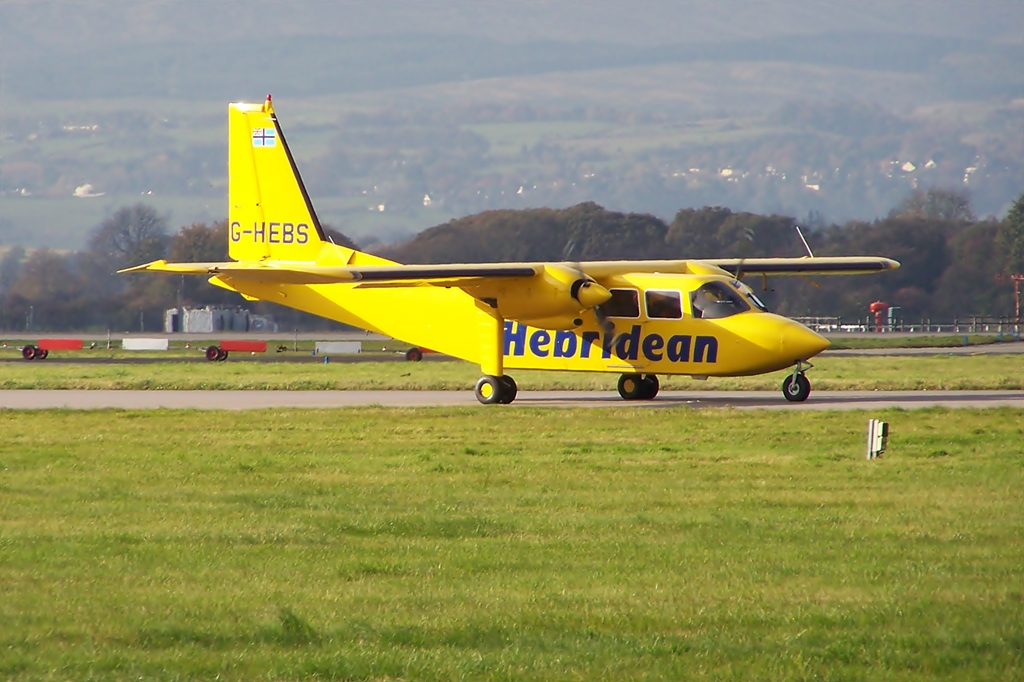
Hebridean Air Services Islander at Glasgow in 2010

As of 2025, Hebridean Air Services operate 3 Britten-Norman BN-2B-26 Islanders, registration G-HEBS, G-HEBO and G-BLNI. G-BLNI is the newest addition to their fleet, being acquired in early 2025 from Alderney's Air Alderney.

Hebridean Air Services fleet
Aircraft	In service	Passengers
Britten-Norman BN-2B-26 Islander	3	9
Total	3	

=== Previously operated ===
- Britten-Norman BN2A Mk. III-1 Trislander
