= Colonsay Airport =

Airport in Scotland

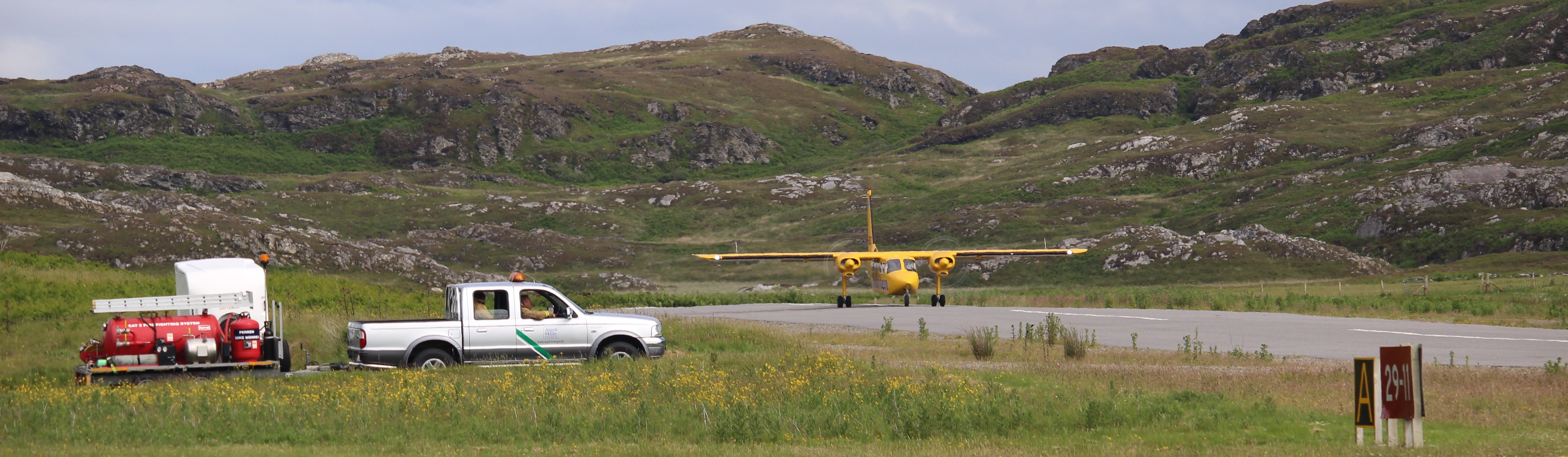
- IATA: CSA; ICAO: EGEY

Summary
- Airport type: Public
- Operator: Argyll and Bute Council
- Serves: Colonsay
- Location: Colonsay, Scotland
- Elevation AMSL: 44 ft / 13 m
- Coordinates: 56°03′27″N 006°14′35″W

Map
- Location on Colonsay Location in Argyll and Bute Location in Scotland

Runways
Direction	Length		Surface
Direction	m	ft	Surface
11/29	501	1,644	Asphalt

Statistics
- Passengers: 49 (2021)
- Sources: UK AIP at NATS

Colonsay Airport (IATA: CSA, ICAO: EGEY) is located on the island of Colonsay, Argyll and Bute, Scotland. Located 3 nautical miles (5.6 km; 3.5 mi) west of Scalasaig, it is a small airport, with 25-minute flights every Tuesday and Thursday to Oban Airport by Hebridean Air Services. Scheduled services commenced in 2006 after the grass airfield was upgraded with a paved runway.

== Airline and destinations ==
Airlines	Destinations
Hebridean Air Services	Oban, Tiree
