= Stornoway Airport =

Stornoway Airport Port-adhair Steòrnabhaigh

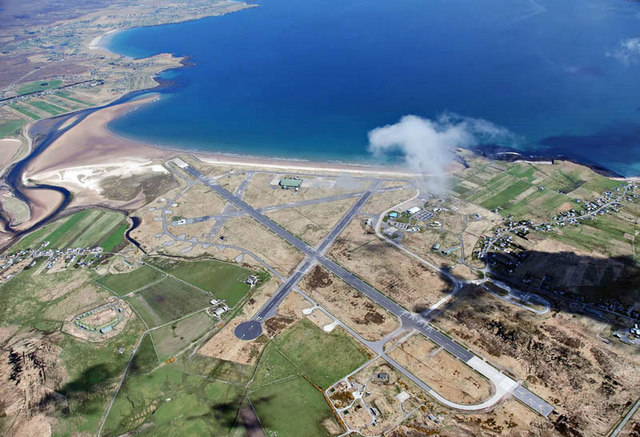
- IATA: SYY; ICAO: EGPO

Summary
- Airport type: Domestic
- Owner/Operator: HIAL
- Serves: Stornoway, Outer Hebrides
- Location: Isle of Lewis, Scotland
- Elevation AMSL: 26 ft / 8 m
- Coordinates: 58°12′56″N 006°19′52″W
- Website: www.hial.co.uk/stornoway-airport/

Map
- Location in Outer Hebrides

Runways
Direction	Length		Surface
Direction	m	ft	Surface
06/24	1,000	3,281	Asphalt
18/36	2,088	6,850	Asphalt

Statistics (2025)
- Passengers: 104,554
- Passenger change 2024–25: ▲4%
- Aircraft movements: 5,310
- Movements change 2024–25: ▲1%
- Sources: UK AIP at NATS; Statistics: UK Civil Aviation Authority

Stornoway Airport (IATA: SYY, ICAO: EGPO) (Scottish Gaelic: Port-adhair Steòrnabhaigh) is an airfield located 2 miles (4 km) east of the town of Stornoway on the Isle of Lewis, in Scotland.

== History ==
The airfield was opened in 1937, and was then used mainly for military purposes. The Royal Air Force had an air base (RAF Stornoway) there during the Second World War and also from 1972 until 1998, when it was a NATO forward operating base. During the Cold War, from 1960 to 1983, the airfield was the home of 112 Signals Unit Stornoway (RAF). NATO aircraft used the airport for missions over the North Atlantic and for stopovers en route to Greenland and the United States.

Nowadays the airfield is mainly used for domestic passenger services. The Royal Mail have a daily mail flight. Bristow Helicopters operate helicopters equipped for search and rescue, on behalf of His Majesty's Coastguard. There are privately owned light aircraft based at the airport. The airport also has been used for cross-wind training of large jets, including the Airbus A350.

Stornoway Airport is owned by HIAL, a company controlled by the Scottish Government.

== Airlines and destinations ==
=== Passenger ===
Airlines	Destinations
Hebridean Air Services	Benbecula
Loganair	Edinburgh, Glasgow, Inverness, Manchester, (Note: Manchester service is a continuation of the Inverness service as the same flight number) Southampton (Note: Southampton service is a continuation of the Edinburgh service as the same flight number)

=== Cargo ===
Airlines	Destinations
Loganair	Benbecula, Glasgow

== Statistics ==
Busiest routes to and from Stornoway (2025)
Rank	Airport	Total passengers	Change 2024 / 25
1	Glasgow	66,915	▲3%
2	Edinburgh	16,509	▲6%
3	Inverness	14,808	▲7%
4	Manchester	5,019	▲82%
5	Benbecula	1,124	▼47%

== Accident and incidents ==
- On 8 December 1983, a Cessna Citation I (G-UESS) crashed into the sea on approach to Stornoway Airport, killing all 10 passengers and crew.
