= Benbecula Airport =

Benbecula Airport Port-adhair Bheinn na Faoghla

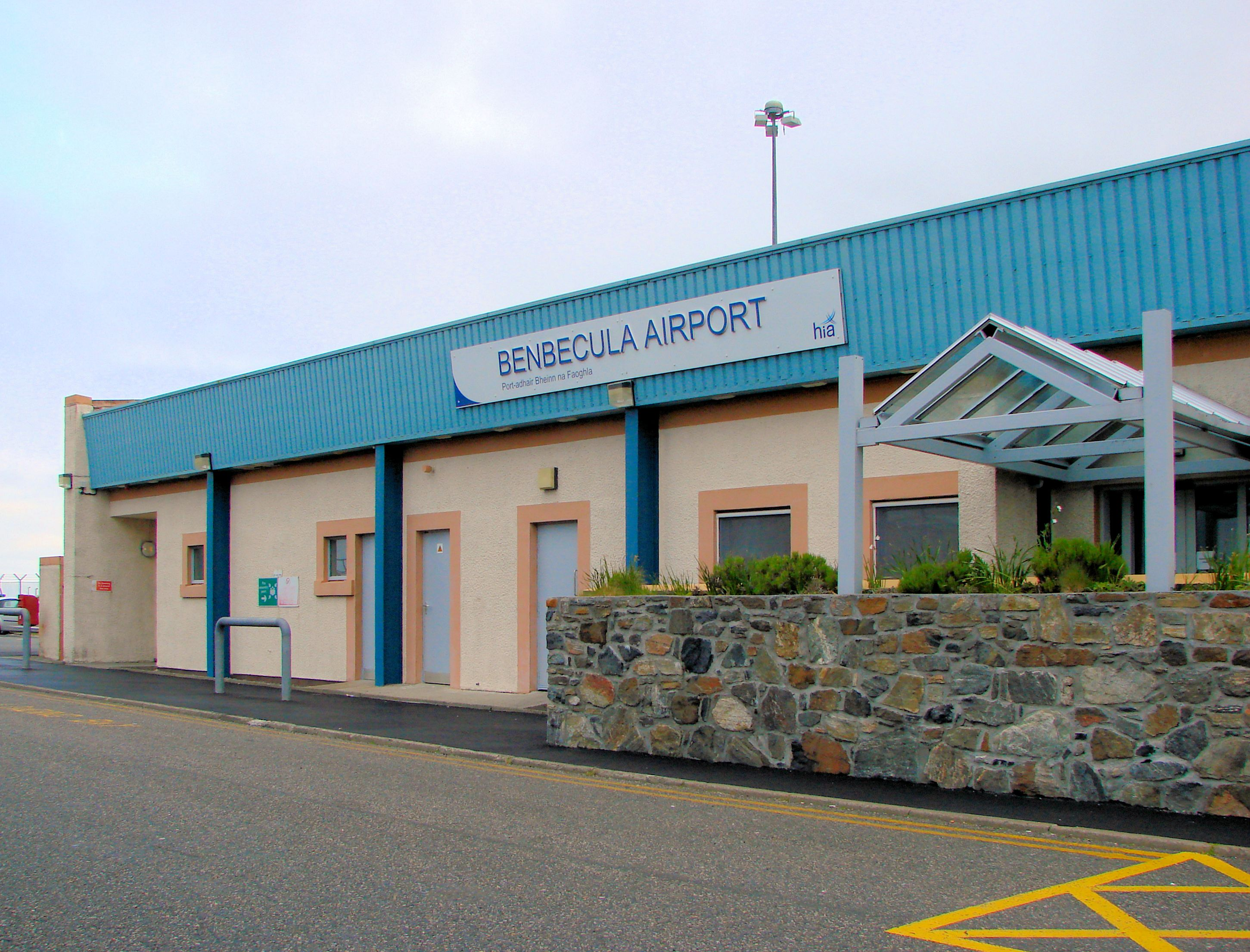
- IATA: BEB; ICAO: EGPL

Summary
- Airport type: Private
- Owner/Operator: HIAL
- Serves: Benbecula
- Location: Balivanich, Scotland
- Elevation AMSL: 19 ft (5.8 m)
- Coordinates: 57°28′52″N 007°21′46″W
- Website: Benbecula Airport

Map
- Location on Benbecula Location in Scotland

Runways
Direction	Length		Surface
Direction	m	ft	Surface
06/24	1,837	6,027	Asphalt

Statistics (2025)
- Movements: 2,075
- Passengers: 26,251
- Sources: UK AIP at NATS; Statistics: UK Civil Aviation Authority

Benbecula Airport (Scottish Gaelic: Port-adhair Bheinn na Faoghla) (IATA: BEB, ICAO: EGPL) is located on the island of Benbecula in the Outer Hebrides, off the West Coast of Scotland. It is a small rural airport owned and maintained by Highlands and Islands Airports Limited.

== History ==
=== Early years ===
An airfield has existed on Benbecula since 1936 when Scottish Airways began operating to what was known as Balivanich Airfield, located on the north west corner of the island.

=== Second World War ===
Between 1941 and 1942, during the Second World War, the airfield became RAF Benbecula, when it came under the control of the Royal Air Force's No. 15 (GR) Group, Coastal Command. During this period it was home to aircraft carrying out patrols in the Atlantic, protecting shipping convoys from German U-Boats. Such missions were carried out by the Lockheed Hudson and latterly the Boeing Fortress and Vickers Wellington.

At its peak, RAF Benbecula had several thousand troops stationed at the station and at several other sites around the islands.

The following units were based at the airfield at some point:

- No. 36 Squadron RAF
- No. 179 Squadron RAF
- No. 206 Squadron RAF
- No. 220 Squadron RAF
- No. 279 Squadron RAF
- No. 280 Squadron RAF
- No. 304 Polish Bomber Squadron
- No. 455 Squadron RAAF
- 814 Naval Air Squadron
- 819 Naval Air Squadron
- 838 Naval Air Squadron
- 842 Naval Air Squadron
- No. 2841 Squadron RAF Regiment

=== Postwar ===
The airfield later became the control centre for the nearby Hebrides Rocket Range. After the Second World War, the airfield became Benbecula Airport.

== Airlines and destinations ==
The airport provides scheduled services to the Scottish mainland and other Hebridean islands. In so doing it provides vital transport connections for the islands of Benbecula, North Uist and South Uist, which are interlinked by causeway but are over two hours from the mainland by sea. The airport is also used by emergency air ambulance flights and by flights supporting the nearby missile test range.

=== Passenger ===
Airlines	Destinations
Hebridean Air Services	Stornoway
Loganair	Glasgow

=== Cargo ===
Airlines	Destinations
Loganair	Inverness, Stornoway

== In popular culture ==
- The airport is also significant to the modern history of Scottish Gaelic literature as, during the Second World War, iconic war poet Dòmhnall Ruadh Chorùna served in the Home Guard, about which he composed the song Òran a' Home Guard ("The Song of the Home Guard"), which pokes fun at an exercise in which a platoon from North Uist was ordered to simulate retaking Benbecula Airport from the invading Germans.
