= Oban Airport =

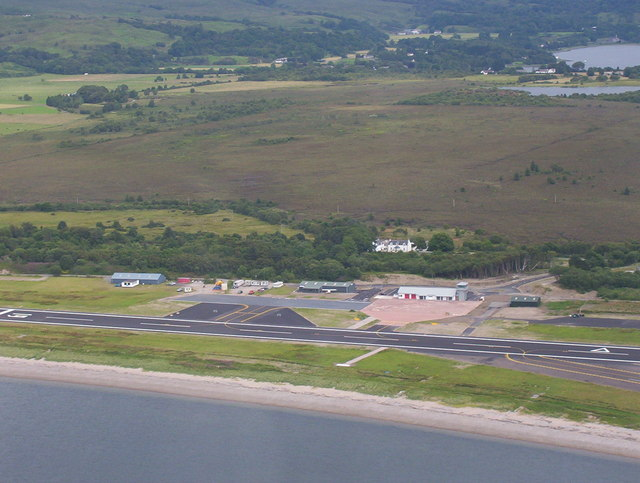
- IATA: OBN; ICAO: EGEO

Summary
- Airport type: Public
- Operator: Argyll and Bute Council
- Serves: Oban
- Location: North Connel, Argyll and Bute, Scotland
- Elevation AMSL: 24 ft / 7 m
- Coordinates: 56°27′49″N 005°24′00″W
- Website: http://obanandtheislesairports.com/

Map
- Location in Argyll and Bute

Runways
Direction	Length		Surface
Direction	m	ft	Surface
01/19	1,264	4,147	Porous Asphalt
- Sources: UK AIP at NATS

Oban Airport (IATA: OBN, ICAO: EGEO) is located 6 miles (9 km) northeast of Oban, near the village of North Connel, Argyll and Bute, Scotland. Operated by Argyll and Bute council, it has a CAA licence as a commercial airport following recent upgrading. Currently Hebridean Air Services is the only airline based at Oban. It operates scheduled flights on two routes, to the Isles of Colonsay and Islay return and to the Isles of Coll and Tiree return.

Sightseeing flights also operate out of Oban Airport with trips around the Loch Linnhe area. Flights include sites such as Oban, the Gulf of Corryvreckan, Tobermory, Castle Stalker and The Bridge over the Atlantic.

Oban airport links the mainland with the islands of Coll, Colonsay, Islay and Tiree. The airstrips on the Islands of Coll and Colonsay, also operated by Argyll and Bute council, have benefitted from extensive upgrading to enable them to attain CAA licensing in 2008 to allow for commercial traffic. Scheduled flights began in 2008.

== History ==
The site was previously RAF Connel a former Royal Air Force emergency landing ground that was operational between 1942 and 1945 during the Second World War. The airfield was operated by No. 17 Group RAF of RAF Coastal Command featuring two tarmaced runways and also used to support RAF Oban, a seaplane base nearby.

== Airline and destinations ==
Airlines	Destinations
Hebridean Air Services	Coll, Colonsay, Tiree^{A}

Notes

- ^{A}: Flight operates via Coll or Colonsay

== Incidents ==
In April 2007, three people were killed after their light aircraft crashed after take-off from the airport. Their destination was Andrewsfield Aerodrome, England.

== Controversy ==
There has been controversy about the running of the airport by Argyll and Bute Council, mainly in the letters and news pages of The Oban Times. It is claimed that costs have soared and the amount of traffic dropped since the takeover. In 2008, police looked into the possible sabotage of an airport fire appliance.

There was further controversy in July 2009 when Argyll Aero Club 'PK' erected a fence around the land that it leases from the airport. The council claimed this reduced the length of the runway meaning fixed wing ambulance flights cannot land.
