= Tiree Airport =

Tiree Airport Port-adhair Thiriodh

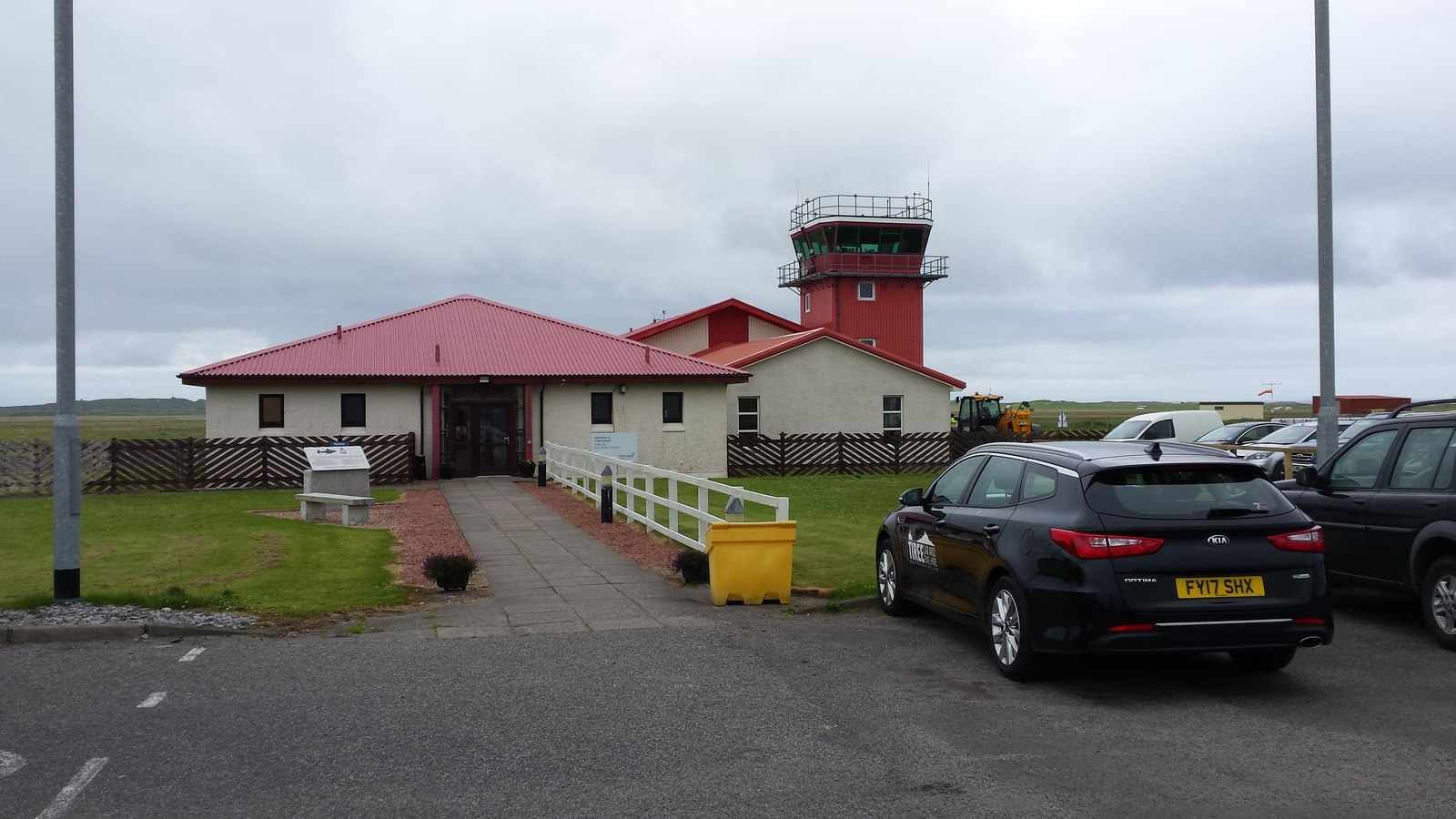
- IATA: TRE; ICAO: EGPU

Summary
- Airport type: Public
- Owner/Operator: HIAL
- Location: Isle of Tiree, Argyll and Bute, Scotland
- Elevation AMSL: 38 ft (12 m)
- Coordinates: 56°29′57″N 006°52′09″W
- Website: hial.co.uk

Map
- Location in Coll and Tiree Location in Argyll and Bute Location in Scotland

Runways
Direction	Length		Surface
Direction	m	ft	Surface
05/23	1,481	4,859	Asphalt
11/29	799	2,621	Asphalt

Statistics (2025)
- Passengers: 10,511
- Passenger change 24-25: ▲6.9%
- Sources: UK AIP at NATS; Statistics from the UK Civil Aviation Authority

Tiree Airport (Scottish Gaelic: Port-adhair Thiriodh) (IATA: TRE, ICAO: EGPU) is located 3 miles (5 km) north–northeast of Balemartine on the island of Tiree in the Inner Hebrides off the west coast of Scotland. It is owned and maintained by Highlands and Islands Airports Limited.

== History ==
The airfield is the former Royal Air Force Tiree which was requisitioned in 1940 and became operational in April 1942 before being transferred to the Ministry of Civil Aviation in 1947.

The following units were based at RAF Tiree at some point:

- No. 224 Squadron RAF
- No. 281 Squadron RAF
- No. 304 Polish Bomber Squadron
- No. 518 Squadron RAF
- 819 Naval Air Squadron
- 845 Naval Air Squadron
- 1840 Naval Air Squadron
- No. 2842 Squadron RAF Regiment
- Meteorological Conversion Unit RAF (October 1943 - February 1944)

Since 2017, passengers departing from Tiree, as well as from Barra and Campbeltown, have not been subject to security checks, instead declaring that they do not have any prohibited items. Upon arrival at Glasgow, passengers connecting to other flights must go through security there.

== Airlines and destinations ==
Airlines	Destinations
Hebridean Air Services	Coll, Oban
Loganair	Glasgow

== Statistics ==
Busiest routes to and from Tiree (2025)
Rank	Airport	Total passengers	Change 2024 / 25
1	Glasgow	10,022	▲5%
