= List of shortest runways =

This is a list of the shortest airport runways in the world. While most modern commercial aircraft require a paved runway of at least 6,000 feet (1,800 m) in length, many early aircraft were designed to operate from unprepared strips that could be improvised in small spaces. Los Angeles's Grand Central Airport, considered a landmark in aviation history, had a 1,200-foot (370 m) runway during its first six years of operation from 1923 to 1929. Such airstrips were used by heavy as well as light aircraft. During the Doolittle Raid in WW II, twin-engine B-25 bombers with a loaded weight of seventeen tons took off from the 827-foot (252 m) flight deck of the carrier USS Hornet. As late as 1977, a Lockheed Constellation demonstrated its ability to use the 2,700-foot (820 m) runway of the Greenwood Lake Airport in New Jersey, and in 1946, a lightened Constellation took off from a grass strip in 2,000 feet (600 m) on only three engines. Most general aviation aircraft retain this short-field performance; the Cessna 172, the most produced aircraft in history, will take off in as little as 805 feet (245 m) at Standard Temperature when fully loaded. Many small airfields capable of accommodating these types remain in use, mostly in remote areas in the American West and the French Alps, where space is limited.

== List of airports with a primary runway less than 2,000 feet (600 m) long ==
ICAO or FAA code	IATA code	Airport name	Location	Length		Elevation (ft)
ICAO or FAA code	IATA code	Airport name	Location	(ft)	(m)	Elevation (ft)
1ID9		Simko Field Airport	Inkom, Idaho, US	400	122	5,640
		Ted Luark Airstrip	Huson, Montana, US	500	152	3,500
		Mile Hi Airstrip	Yellow Pine, Idaho, US	560	171	5,831
		Dewey Moore Airstrip	Big Creek, Idaho, US	700	213	4,494
		James Ranch Airstrip	Warren, Idaho, US	800	244	2,117
IT-67/AO02		Altiporto di Chamois	Chamois, Aosta Valley, IT	850	259	5,886
MT94		Ousel Falls Airport	Big Sky, Montana, US	900	274	6,600
		Simonds Airstrip	Yellow Pine, Idaho, US	900	274	5,243
ME46		Back Acres Airport	Kennebunkport, Maine, US	1,000	305	60
27MT		Rahn Airport	Kalispell, Montana, US	1,000	305	3,090
5NA0		Semchenko Airport	Max, North Dakota, US	1,100	335	2,065
		Vines Airstrip	Big Creek, Idaho, US	1,100	335	4,110
4NY8		Harris Hill Gliderport	Elmira, New York, US	1,115	340	1,709
LFJD		Corlier Aerodrome	Corlier, France	1,148	350	2,762
WA39		Crow Valley Airport	Eastsound, Washington, US	1,171	357	113
3NA2		Lorentzen Airport	Washburn, North Dakota, US	1,200	366	1,790
		Red Creek Airstrip	Payson, Arizona, US	1,200	366	2,400
MT42		Hasskamp Airport	Three Forks, Montana, US	1,225	373	4,052
89OR		Mucky Flat Airport	Eagle Point, Oregon, US	1,250	381	2,000
EGFO	FOA	Foula Airfield	Foula, Shetland Islands, UK	1,252	382	150
EGNF		Netherthorpe Airfield	Worksop, England, UK	1,253	382	254
26OG		Oakridge Airport	Eagle Point, Oregon, US	1,275	389	1,560
08ND		Brecht Strip	Golden Valley, North Dakota, US	1,300	396	1,990
30MT		Nistler Strip	Helena, Montana, US	1,304	397	4,753
TNCS	SAB	Juancho E. Yrausquin Airport	Saba	1,312	400	138
LSZO		Luzern-Beromünster	Neudorf, Lucerne, Switzerland	1,312	400	2,146
FXME		Matekane Air Strip	Matekane, Lesotho	1,312	400	7,544
2NA0		Soderquist Airport	Wilton, North Dakota, US	1,320	402	1,880
LFKX		Méribel Altiport	Les Allues, France	1,332	406	5,639
EDMJ		Jesenwang Airport	Jesenwang, Germany	1,339	408	1,861
NV31		Barker Creek Ranch Airstrip	Round Mountain, Nevada, US	1,350	411	6,600
EICN		Coonagh Aerodrome	Limerick, Ireland	1,365	416	6
ID13		Sky Island Ranch Airport	St. Maries, Idaho, US	1,400	427	2,880
40MT		Silver Creek Airport	Helena, Montana, US	1,400	427	3,860
N61		Hinshaw (Greenacres) Airport	Liberty, North Carolina, US	1,400	427	750
OG13		Fly by Night Airport	Ruch, Oregon, US	1,402	427	1,660
LFHM	MVV	Megève Altiport	Megève, France	1,424	434	4,830
LFKL		Lyon Brindas Airport	Brindas, France	1,427	435	1,040
		Flugplatz Locher Sarntal	Locher, Italy	1,434	437	2,608
MT06		Duncan Airport	Helena, Montana, US	1,467	447	4,260
WA93		Eliza Island Airport	Eliza Island, Washington, US	1,500	457	8
LFHU	AHZ	Alpe d'Huez Airport	Alpe d'Huez, France	1,500	457	6,102
84OR		B Bar Ranch Airport	Selma, Oregon, US	1,500	457	1,400
0MT9		Lone Hawk Airport	Whitefish, Montana, US	1,500	457	3,284
MT83		Ten Mile Airport	Helena, Montana, US	1,500	457	4,294
PAMD	MDO	Middleton Island Airport	Middleton Island, Alaska, US	1,500	457	100
C48		Wilson Bar Airstrip	Warren, Idaho, US	1,500	457	2,275
2WA3		Stuart Island West	Stuart Island, Washington	1,560	475	200
EDXH	HGL	Heligoland Airfield	Heligoland, Germany	1,575	480	5
78WA		Center Island Airport	Center Island (Washington)	1,600	488	115
CD02		Skyote Airport	Steamboat Springs, Colorado, US	1,600	488	8,200
VNDT	SIH	Doti Airport	Dipayal Silgadhi, Nepal	1,608	490	650
LSPV		Wangen-Lachen Airport	Wangen, SZ, Switzerland	1,640	500	1,335
TAPH	BBQ	Barbuda Codrington Airport	Codrington, Antigua and Barbuda	1,640	500	15
EFHL		Hailuoto Airfield	Hailuoto, Finland	1,640	500	7
85U		Soldier Bar Airstrip	Big Creek, Idaho, US	1,650	503	4,190
EDXP		Harle Airfield	Harlesiel, Lower Saxony, Germany	1,673	510	7
CYGZ	YGZ	Grise Fiord Airport	Grise Fiord, Nunavut, Canada	1,675	511	135
EGER	SOY	Stronsay Airport	Stronsay, Orkney, UK	1,690	515	39
0OR5		East Oregon Cattle Company Airport	Eagle Point, Oregon, US	1,700	518	1,345
NA12		Johnson Private Airport	Turtle Lake, North Dakota, US	1,700	518	1,920
EGHE	ISC	St Mary's Airport, Isles of Scilly	Isles of Scilly, United Kingdom	1,722	525	116
23MT		Waterfall Airport	Bozeman, Montana, US	1,725	526	4,950
VNLK	LUA	Tenzing–Hillary Airport	Lukla, Nepal	1,729	527	9,334
EGEN	NRL	North Ronaldsay Airport	North Ronaldsay, Orkney, UK	1,729	527	56
EGEP	PPW	Papa Westray Airport	Papa Westray Airport, Orkney, UK	1,729	527	91
EGES	NDY	Sanday Airport	Scotland, Orkney, UK	1,729	527	66
EGEW	WRY	Westray Airport	Westray, Orkney, UK	1,729	527	29
13W		Camano Island Airfield	Stanwood, Washington, US	1,750	533	145
5S4		Toledo State Airport	Newport, Oregon, US	1,750	533	12
I08		Cabin Creek Airstrip	Big Creek, Idaho, US	1,750	533	4,289
CD20		Sprague Airport	Loveland, Colorado, US	1,750	533	5,603
LFLJ	CVF	Courchevel Altiport	Courchevel, France	1,762	537	6,588
EGEF	FIE	Fair Isle Airport	Shetland, United Kingdom	1,762	537	237
CKU	CKU	Cordova Municipal Airport	Cordova, Alaska, US	1,800	549	12
3B8		Shady Acres Airport	Spanaway, Washington, US	1,800	549	445
KCZK		Cascade Locks State	Cascade Locks, Oregon, US	1,800	549	151
8S2		Cashmere Dryden	Cashmere, Washington, US	1,800	549	857
CPL3		Kars/Rideau Valley Air Park	Kars, Ontario, Canada	1,800	549	286
CAH3		Courtenay Airpark	Courtenay, British Columbia, Canada	1,800	549	9
16CO		Dry Pen Airport	Parachute, Colorado, US	1,800	549	5,331
MT71		Edsall Field	Bozeman, Montana, US	1,800	549	4,659
34CD		Elk Park Ranch Airport	Allenspark, Colorado, US	1,800	549	7,900
31D		Inter County Airport	Irwin, Pennsylvania, US	1,800	549	1,250
HI23		Mountain View Airstrip	Mountain View, Hawaii, US	1,800	549	1,500
10ND		Smith Strip	Halliday, North Dakota, US	1,800	549	2,200
1MT3		Wood Strip	Elliston, Montana, US	1,800	549	5,100
1I8		Converse	Converse, Indiana, US	1,800	549	840
39P		Strom Field Airport	Morton, Washington, US	1,810	552	941
2W2		Clearview Airpark	Westminster, Maryland, US	1,840	561	760
WN13		Vaughan Ranch Airfield	Port Orchard, Washington, US	1,850	564	240
KPFC		Pacific City State Airport	Pacific City, Oregon, US	1,860	567	10
YOBR		Old Bar Heritage Airport	Old Bar, New South Wales	1,944	593	10
N43		Braden Airpark	Easton, Pennsylvania, US	1,956	596	399
9CL3		Likely Airport	Likely, California, US	1,960	597	4,420
TRPG	MNI	John A. Osborne Airport	Montserrat	1,968	600	550
EDWL		Langeoog Airfield	Langeoog, Germany	1,968	600	5

== See also ==
- Airpark
- Altiport
- Aviation
- Density altitude
- Highway strip
- List of longest runways
- Satellite airfield
- STOLport
- Joint-use airport
- Naval outlying landing field
