= List of British Airways destinations =

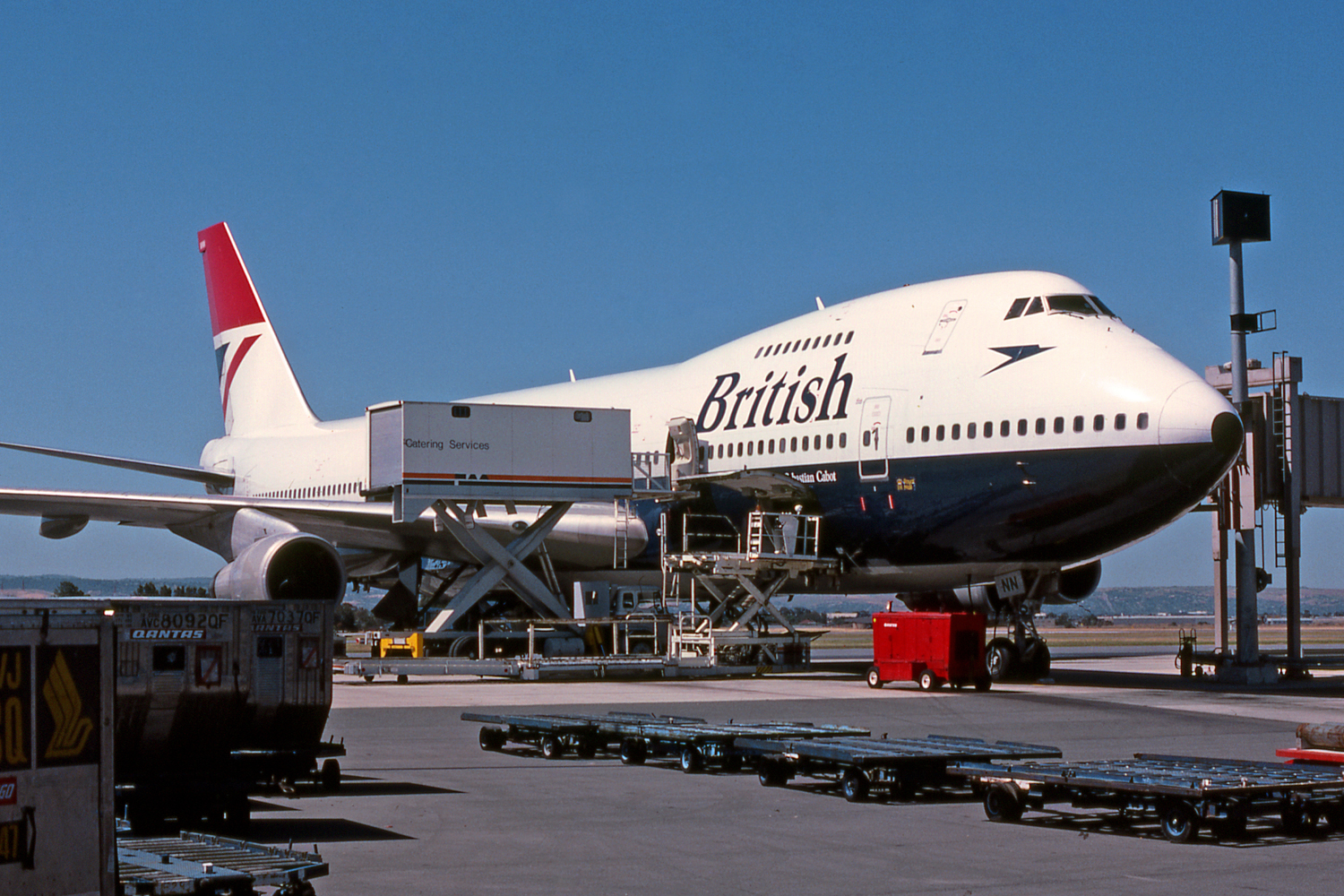
British Airways 747-136 at Adelaide Airport, Australia in 1984.

British Airways serves destinations across all six inhabited continents. The following is a list of destinations the airline flies to, as of September 2026; terminated destinations are also listed. The list does not include cities served solely by affiliated regional carriers, and some terminated destinations may now be served either via franchise or through codeshare agreements with other carriers.

The airline flies to a total of 231 destinations, including 12 domestic destinations within the UK and 219 international destinations across 80 countries.

The country with the most international destinations served is the United States with 27, followed by Italy with 19, Spain with 13, then France and Greece with 12 each.

== List ==
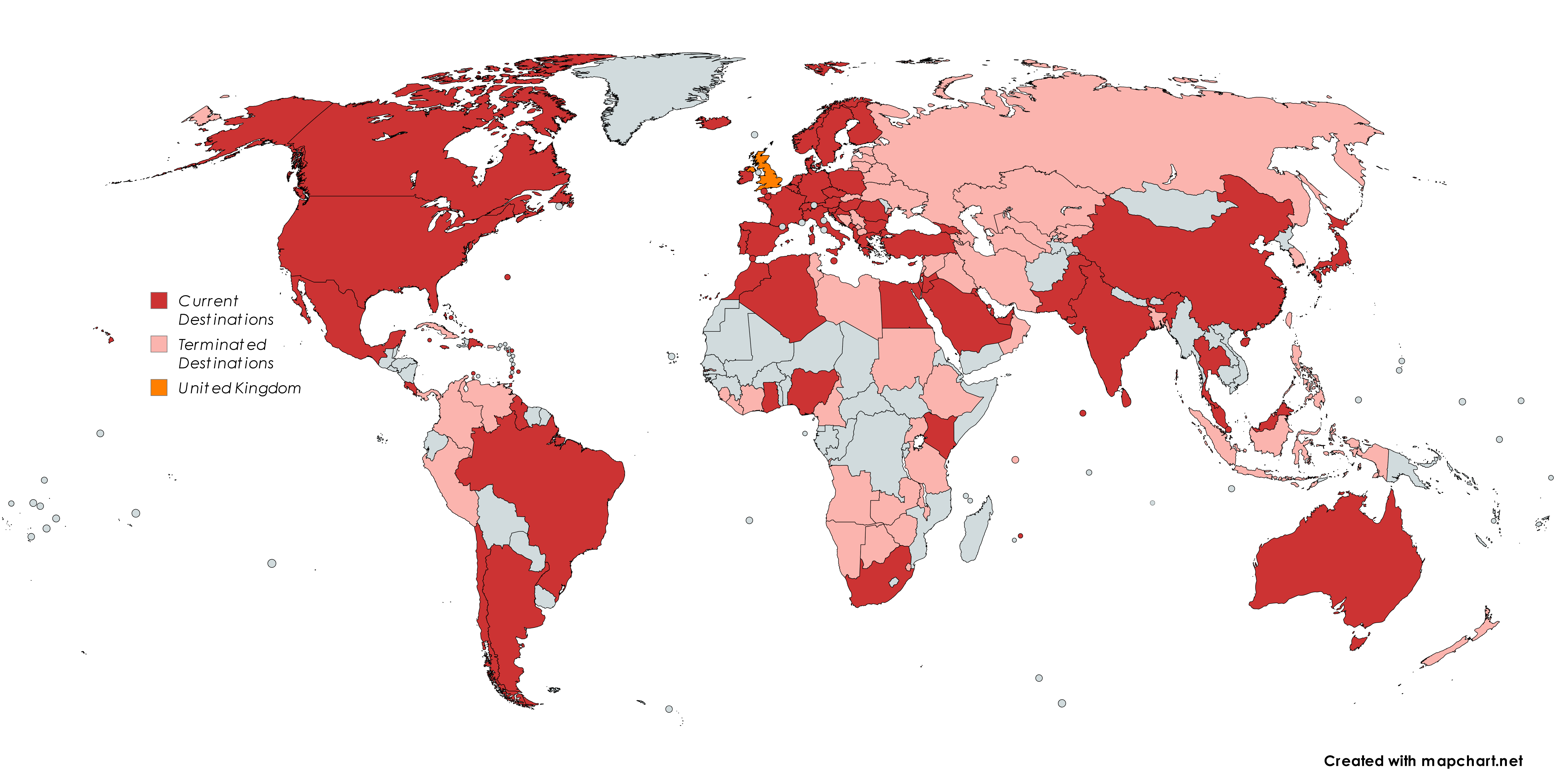
British Airways passenger destinations

| Country | City | Airport | Notes | Refs |
|---|---|---|---|---|
| Albania | Tirana | Tirana International Airport Nënë Tereza | Passenger | |
| Algeria | Algiers | Houari Boumediene Airport | Passenger | |
| Algeria | Hassi Messaoud | Oued Irara–Krim Belkacem Airport | Terminated | |
| Angola | Luanda | Quatro de Fevereiro Airport | Terminated | |
| Antigua and Barbuda | St. John's | V. C. Bird International Airport | Passenger | |
| Argentina | Buenos Aires | Ministro Pistarini International Airport | Passenger | |
| Armenia | Yerevan | Zvartnots International Airport | Terminated | |
| Aruba | Oranjestad | Queen Beatrix International Airport | Passenger | |
| Australia | Adelaide | Adelaide Airport | Terminated | |
| Australia | Brisbane | Brisbane Airport | Terminated | |
| Australia | Darwin | Darwin Airport | Terminated | |
| Australia | Melbourne | Melbourne Airport | Resumes 9 January 2027 | |
| Australia | Perth | Perth Airport | Terminated | |
| Australia | Sydney | Sydney Airport | Passenger | |
| Austria | Innsbruck | Innsbruck Airport | Seasonal | |
| Austria | Graz | Graz Airport | Passenger | |
| Austria | Linz | Linz Airport | Terminated | |
| Austria | Salzburg | Salzburg Airport | Passenger | |
| Austria | Vienna | Vienna International Airport | Passenger | |
| Azerbaijan | Baku | Heydar Aliyev International Airport | Terminated | |
| Bahamas | Nassau | Lynden Pindling International Airport | Passenger | |
| Bahamas | Freeport | Grand Bahama International Airport | Terminated | |
| Bahrain | Manama | Bahrain International Airport | Passenger + cargo | |
| Bangladesh | Dhaka | Hazrat Shahjalal International Airport | Terminated | |
| Barbados | Bridgetown | Grantley Adams International Airport | Passenger | |
| Belarus | Minsk | Minsk National Airport | Terminated | |
| Belgium | Antwerp | Antwerp International Airport | Terminated | |
| Belgium | Brussels | Brussels Airport | Passenger | |
| Belgium | Ostend | Ostend–Bruges International Airport | Terminated | |
| Bermuda | Hamilton | L.F. Wade International Airport | Passenger | |
| Bosnia and Herzegovina | Sarajevo | Sarajevo International Airport | Terminated | |
| Botswana | Gaborone | Sir Seretse Khama International Airport | Terminated | |
| Brazil | Rio de Janeiro | Rio de Janeiro/Galeão International Airport | Passenger | |
| Brazil | São Paulo | São Paulo/Guarulhos International Airport | Passenger | |
| Brunei | Bandar Seri Begawan | Brunei International Airport | Terminated | |
| Bulgaria | Sofia | Sofia Airport | Passenger | |
| Bulgaria | Varna | Varna Airport | Terminated | |
| Cameroon | Douala | Douala International Airport | Terminated | |
| Canada | Calgary | Calgary International Airport | Terminated | |
| Canada | Kelowna | Kelowna International Airport | Terminated | |
| Canada | Montreal | Montréal–Mirabel International Airport | Airport closed | |
| Canada | Montreal | Montréal–Trudeau International Airport | Passenger | |
| Canada | Toronto | Toronto Pearson International Airport | Passenger | |
| Canada | Vancouver | Vancouver International Airport | Passenger | |
| Cayman Islands | George Town | Owen Roberts International Airport | Passenger | |
| Chile | Santiago | Arturo Merino Benítez International Airport | Passenger | |
| China | Beijing | Beijing Capital International Airport | Terminated | |
| China | Beijing | Beijing Daxing International Airport | Terminated | |
| China | Chengdu | Chengdu Shuangliu International Airport | Terminated | |
| Colombia | Bogotá | El Dorado International Airport | Terminated | |
| Costa Rica | San José | Juan Santamaría International Airport | Passenger | |
| Croatia | Dubrovnik | Dubrovnik Airport | Passenger | |
| Croatia | Pula | Pula Airport | Terminated | |
| Croatia | Split | Split Airport | Seasonal | |
| Croatia | Zagreb | Zagreb Airport | Terminated | |
| Cuba | Havana | José Martí International Airport | Terminated | |
| Cyprus | Larnaca | Larnaca International Airport | Passenger | |
| Cyprus | Paphos | Paphos International Airport | Seasonal | |
| Czech Republic | Prague | Václav Havel Airport Prague | Passenger | |
| Denmark | Aarhus | Aarhus Airport | Terminated | |
| Denmark | Billund | Billund Airport | Passenger | |
| Denmark | Copenhagen | Copenhagen Airport | Passenger | |
| Denmark | Thisted | Thisted Airport | Terminated | |
| Dominican Republic | Punta Cana | Punta Cana International Airport | Passenger | |
| Egypt | Alexandria | Alexandria International Airport | Terminated | |
| Egypt | Alexandria | El Nouzha Airport | Airport closed | |
| Egypt | Cairo | Cairo International Airport | Passenger | |
| Egypt | Hurghada | Hurghada International Airport | Terminated | |
| Egypt | Luxor | Luxor International Airport | Terminated | |
| Egypt | Sharm El Sheikh | Sharm El Sheikh International Airport | Passenger | |
| Estonia | Tallinn | Tallinn Airport | Terminated | |
| Eswatini | Manzini | Matsapha Airport | Terminated | |
| Ethiopia | Addis Ababa | Addis Ababa Bole International Airport | Terminated | |
| Finland | Helsinki | Helsinki Airport | Passenger | |
| Finland | Ivalo | Ivalo Airport | Seasonal | |
| Finland | Tampere | Tampere–Pirkkala Airport | Terminated | |
| Finland | Turku | Turku Airport | Terminated | |
| Finland | Vaasa | Vaasa Airport | Terminated | |
| France | Annecy | Annecy–Haute-Savoie–Mont Blanc Airport | Terminated | |
| France | Bastia | Bastia–Poretta Airport | Seasonal | |
| France | Biarritz | Biarritz Pays Basque Airport | Terminated | |
| France | Bordeaux | Bordeaux–Mérignac Airport | Passenger | |
| France | Chambéry | Chambéry Airport | Seasonal | |
| France | Figari | Figari–Sud Corse Airport | Seasonal | |
| France | Grenoble | Alpes–Isère Airport | Seasonal | |
| France | Limoges | Limoges–Bellegarde Airport | Terminated | |
| France | Lourdes | Tarbes–Lourdes–Pyrénées Airport | Terminated | |
| France | Lyon | Lyon–Saint-Exupéry Airport | Passenger | |
| France | Marseille | Marseille Provence Airport | Passenger | |
| France | Montpellier | Montpellier–Méditerranée Airport | Seasonal | |
| France | Nantes | Nantes Atlantique Airport | Terminated | |
| France | Nice | Nice Côte d'Azur Airport | Passenger | |
| France | Paris | Charles de Gaulle Airport | Passenger | |
| France | Paris | Orly Airport | Terminated | |
| France | Perpignan | Perpignan–Rivesaltes Airport | Terminated | |
| France | Quimper | Quimper–Cornouaille Airport | Seasonal | |
| France | Toulouse | Toulouse–Blagnac Airport | Passenger | |
| Gambia | Banjul | Banjul International Airport | Terminated | |
| Georgia | Tbilisi | Tbilisi International Airport | Passenger | |
| Germany | Berlin | Berlin Brandenburg Airport | Passenger | |
| Germany | Berlin | Berlin Tegel Airport | Airport closed | |
| Germany | Bremen | Bremen Airport | Terminated | |
| Germany | Cologne | Cologne Bonn Airport | Begins 23 November 2026 | |
| Germany | Dresden | Dresden Airport | Terminated | |
| Germany | Düsseldorf | Düsseldorf Airport | Passenger | |
| Germany | Frankfurt | Frankfurt Airport | Passenger + cargo | |
| Germany | Friedrichshafen | Friedrichshafen Airport | Terminated | |
| Germany | Hamburg | Hamburg Airport | Passenger | |
| Germany | Hanover | Hannover Airport | Passenger | |
| Germany | Leipzig | Leipzig/Halle Airport | Terminated | |
| Germany | Munich | Munich Airport | Passenger | |
| Germany | Münster | Münster Osnabrück Airport | Terminated | |
| Germany | Nuremberg | Nuremberg Airport | Seasonal | |
| Germany | Saarbrücken | Saarbrücken Airport | Terminated | |
| Germany | Stuttgart | Stuttgart Airport | Terminated | |
| Germany | Sylt | Sylt Airport | Terminated | |
| Ghana | Accra | Accra International Airport | Passenger | |
| Gibraltar | Gibraltar | Gibraltar International Airport | Passenger | |
| Greece | Athens | Athens International Airport | Passenger | |
| Greece | Athens | Ellinikon International Airport | Airport closed | |
| Greece | Chania | Chania International Airport | Seasonal | |
| Greece | Corfu | Corfu International Airport | Seasonal | |
| Greece | Kalamata | Kalamata International Airport | Seasonal | |
| Greece | Kefalonia | Kefalonia International Airport | Seasonal | |
| Greece | Kos | Kos International Airport | Seasonal | |
| Greece | Mykonos | Mykonos Airport | Seasonal | |
| Greece | Preveza | Aktion National Airport | Seasonal | |
| Greece | Rhodes | Rhodes International Airport | Seasonal | |
| Greece | Santorini | Santorini International Airport | Seasonal | |
| Greece | Skiathos | Skiathos International Airport | Seasonal | |
| Greece | Thessaloniki | Thessaloniki Airport | Seasonal | |
| Greece | Zakynthos | Zakynthos International Airport | Seasonal | |
| Grenada | St. George's | Maurice Bishop International Airport | Passenger | |
| Guernsey | Forest | Guernsey Airport | Passenger | |
| Guyana | Georgetown | Cheddi Jagan International Airport | Passenger | |
| Hong Kong | Hong Kong | Hong Kong International Airport | Passenger + cargo | |
| Hong Kong | Hong Kong | Kai Tak Airport | Airport closed | |
| Hungary | Budapest | Budapest Ferenc Liszt International Airport | Passenger | |
| Iceland | Reykjavík | Keflavík International Airport | Passenger | |
| India | Bengaluru | Kempegowda International Airport | Passenger | |
| India | Chennai | Chennai International Airport | Passenger + cargo | |
| India | Delhi | Indira Gandhi International Airport | Passenger + cargo | |
| India | Hyderabad | Rajiv Gandhi International Airport | Passenger | |
| India | Kolkata | Netaji Subhas Chandra Bose International Airport | Terminated | |
| India | Mumbai | Chhatrapati Shivaji Maharaj International Airport | Passenger + cargo | |
| Indonesia | Jakarta | Soekarno–Hatta International Airport | Terminated | |
| Iran | Tehran | Mehrabad International Airport | Terminated | |
| Iran | Tehran | Imam Khomeini International Airport | Terminated | |
| Iraq | Baghdad | Baghdad International Airport | Terminated | |
| Ireland | Cork | Cork Airport | Terminated | |
| Ireland | Dublin | Dublin Airport | Passenger | |
| Ireland | Shannon | Shannon Airport | Terminated | |
| Ireland | Waterford | Waterford Airport | Terminated | |
| Israel | Tel Aviv | Ben Gurion Airport | | |
| Italy | Bari | Bari Karol Wojtyła Airport | Seasonal | |
| Italy | Bergamo | Milan Bergamo Airport | Terminated | |
| Italy | Bologna | Bologna Guglielmo Marconi Airport | Passenger | |
| Italy | Brindisi | Brindisi Airport | Seasonal | |
| Italy | Cagliari | Cagliari Elmas Airport | Seasonal | |
| Italy | Catania | Catania–Fontanarossa Airport | Passenger | |
| Italy | Genoa | Genoa Cristoforo Colombo Airport | Terminated | |
| Italy | Florence | Florence Airport | Passenger | |
| Italy | Milan | Milan Linate Airport | Passenger | |
| Italy | Milan | Milan Malpensa Airport | Passenger | |
| Italy | Naples | Naples International Airport | Passenger | |
| Italy | Olbia | Olbia Costa Smeralda Airport | Seasonal | |
| Italy | Palermo | Falcone Borsellino Airport | Seasonal | |
| Italy | Perugia | Perugia San Francesco d'Assisi – Umbria International Airport | Seasonal | |
| Italy | Pisa | Pisa International Airport | Passenger | |
| Italy | Rimini | Rimini Fellini Airport | Passenger | |
| Italy | Rome | Rome Fiumicino Airport | Passenger | |
| Italy | Salerno | Salerno Costa d'Amalfi Airport | Passenger | |
| Italy | Trieste | Trieste – Friuli Venezia Giulia Airport | Terminated | |
| Italy | Turin | Turin Airport | Passenger | |
| Italy | Venice | Venice Marco Polo Airport | Passenger | |
| Italy | Verona | Verona Villafranca Airport | Passenger | |
| Ivory Coast | Abidjan | Félix-Houphouët-Boigny International Airport | Terminated | |
| Jamaica | Kingston | Norman Manley International Airport | Passenger | |
| Jamaica | Montego Bay | Sangster International Airport | Terminated | |
| Japan | Fukuoka | Fukuoka Airport | Terminated | |
| Japan | Nagoya | Nagoya Komaki Airport | Terminated | |
| Japan | Osaka | Itami Airport | Terminated | |
| Japan | Osaka | Kansai International Airport | Terminated | |
| Japan | Tokyo | Haneda Airport | Passenger | |
| Japan | Tokyo | Narita International Airport | Terminated | |
| Jersey | St. Peter | Jersey Airport | Passenger | |
| Jordan | Amman | Queen Alia International Airport | Passenger | |
| Kazakhstan | Almaty | Almaty International Airport | Terminated | |
| Kenya | Nairobi | Jomo Kenyatta International Airport | Passenger + cargo | |
| Kosovo | Pristina | Pristina International Airport | Terminated | |
| Kuwait | Kuwait City | Kuwait International Airport | Passenger | |
| Kyrgyzstan | Bishkek | Manas International Airport | Terminated | |
| Latvia | Riga | Riga International Airport | Terminated | |
| Lebanon | Beirut | Beirut–Rafic Hariri International Airport | Terminated | |
| Liberia | Monrovia | Roberts International Airport | Terminated | |
| Libya | Tripoli | Tripoli International Airport | Airport closed | |
| Lithuania | Vilnius | Vilnius International Airport | Terminated | |
| Luxembourg | Luxembourg City | Luxembourg Airport | Passenger | |
| Malawi | Blantyre | Chileka International Airport | Terminated | |
| Malawi | Lilongwe | Lilongwe International Airport | Terminated | |
| Malaysia | Kuala Lumpur | Kuala Lumpur International Airport | Passenger | |
| Maldives | Malé | Velana International Airport | Seasonal | |
| Malta | Valletta | Malta International Airport | Passenger | |
| Mauritius | Plaine Magnien | Sir Seewoosagur Ramgoolam International Airport | Passenger | |
| Mexico | Cancún | Cancún International Airport | Passenger | |
| Mexico | Mexico City | Mexico City International Airport | Passenger | |
| Morocco | Agadir | Agadir–Al Massira Airport | Passenger | |
| Morocco | Casablanca | Mohammed V International Airport | Terminated | |
| Morocco | Fez | Fès–Saïs Airport | Terminated | |
| Morocco | Marrakesh | Marrakesh Menara Airport | Passenger | |
| Morocco | Tangier | Tangier Ibn Battouta Airport | Terminated | |
| Morocco | Rabat | Rabat–Salé Airport | Passenger | |
| Montenegro | Tivat | Tivat Airport | Seasonal | |
| Namibia | Windhoek | Hosea Kutako International Airport | Terminated | |
| Netherlands | Amsterdam | Amsterdam Airport Schiphol | Passenger | |
| Netherlands | Eindhoven | Eindhoven Airport | Terminated | |
| Netherlands | Rotterdam | Rotterdam The Hague Airport | Passenger | |
| New Zealand | Auckland | Auckland Airport | Terminated | |
| New Zealand | Christchurch | Christchurch Airport | Terminated | |
| Nigeria | Abuja | Nnamdi Azikiwe International Airport | Passenger | |
| Nigeria | Kano | Mallam Aminu Kano International Airport | Terminated | |
| Nigeria | Lagos | Murtala Muhammed International Airport | Passenger | |
| North Macedonia | Skopje | Skopje International Airport | Terminated | |
| Norway | Bergen | Bergen Airport | Begins 15 April 2027 | |
| Norway | Geilo | Fagernes Airport | Terminated | |
| Norway | Haugesund | Haugesund Airport | Terminated | |
| Norway | Oslo | Oslo Fornebu Airport | Airport closed | |
| Norway | Oslo | Oslo Airport, Gardermoen | Passenger | |
| Norway | Stavanger | Stavanger Airport | Terminated | |
| Norway | Tromsø | Tromsø Airport | Seasonal | |
| Oman | Muscat | Muscat International Airport | Terminated | |
| Pakistan | Islamabad | Benazir Bhutto International Airport | Airport closed | |
| Pakistan | Islamabad | Islamabad International Airport | Passenger | |
| Pakistan | Karachi | Jinnah International Airport | Terminated | |
| Pakistan | Lahore | Allama Iqbal International Airport | Terminated | |
| Panama | Panama City | Tocumen International Airport | Terminated | |
| Peru | Lima | Jorge Chávez International Airport | Terminated | |
| Philippines | Manila | Ninoy Aquino International Airport | Terminated | |
| Poland | Gdańsk | Gdańsk Lech Wałęsa Airport | Terminated | |
| Poland | Kraków | Kraków John Paul II International Airport | Passenger | |
| Poland | Poznań | Poznań–Ławica Airport | Terminated | |
| Poland | Warsaw | Warsaw Chopin Airport | Passenger | |
| Portugal | Faro | Faro Airport | Passenger | |
| Portugal | Funchal | Madeira Airport | Passenger | |
| Portugal | Lisbon | Lisbon Airport | Passenger | |
| Portugal | Porto | Porto Airport | Passenger | |
| Portugal | Porto Santo | Porto Santo Airport | Terminated | |
| Puerto Rico | San Juan | Luis Muñoz Marín International Airport | Terminated | |
| Qatar | Doha | Doha International Airport | Airport closed | |
| Qatar | Doha | Hamad International Airport | Passenger | |
| Romania | Bucharest | Bucharest Henri Coandă International Airport | Passenger | |
| Russia | Moscow | Moscow Domodedovo Airport | Terminated | |
| Russia | Moscow | Sheremetyevo International Airport | Terminated | |
| Russia | Saint Petersburg | Pulkovo Airport | Terminated | |
| Saint Kitts and Nevis | Basseterre | Robert L. Bradshaw International Airport | Passenger | |
| Saint Lucia | Vieux Fort | Hewanorra International Airport | Passenger | |
| Saudi Arabia | Dammam | King Fahd International Airport | Terminated | |
| Saudi Arabia | Dhahran | Dhahran International Airport | Airport closed | |
| Saudi Arabia | Jeddah | King Abdulaziz International Airport | Terminated | |
| Saudi Arabia | Riyadh | King Khalid International Airport | | |
| Serbia | Belgrade | Belgrade Nikola Tesla Airport | Terminated | |
| Seychelles | Mahé | Seychelles International Airport | Terminated | |
| Sierra Leone | Freetown | Lungi International Airport | Terminated | |
| Singapore | Singapore | Changi Airport | Passenger | |
| Slovakia | Bratislava | Bratislava Airport | Terminated | |
| Slovenia | Ljubljana | Ljubljana Airport | Seasonal | |
| South Africa | Cape Town | Cape Town International Airport | Passenger | |
| South Africa | Durban | King Shaka International Airport | Terminated | |
| South Africa | Hoedspruit | Eastgate Airport | Terminated | |
| South Africa | Johannesburg | O. R. Tambo International Airport | Passenger + cargo | |
| South Africa | Port Elizabeth | Port Elizabeth Airport | Terminated | |
| South Africa | Richards Bay | Richards Bay Airport | Terminated | |
| South Korea | Seoul | Gimpo International Airport | Terminated | |
| South Korea | Seoul | Incheon International Airport | Terminated | |
| Spain | Alicante | Alicante–Elche Miguel Hernández Airport | Passenger | |
| Spain | Almería | Almería Airport | Terminated | |
| Spain | Barcelona | Josep Tarradellas Barcelona–El Prat Airport | Passenger | |
| Spain | Bilbao | Bilbao Airport | Terminated | |
| Spain | Fuerteventura | Fuerteventura Airport | Passenger | |
| Spain | Ibiza | Ibiza Airport | Seasonal | |
| Spain | Jerez de la Frontera | Jerez Airport | Terminated | |
| Spain | Lanzarote | Lanzarote Airport | Passenger | |
| Spain | Las Palmas | Gran Canaria Airport | Seasonal | |
| Spain | Madrid | Madrid–Barajas Airport | Passenger + cargo | |
| Spain | Málaga | Málaga Airport | Passenger | |
| Spain | Menorca | Menorca Airport | Seasonal | |
| Spain | Murcia | Murcia–San Javier Airport | Terminated | |
| Spain | Palma de Mallorca | Palma de Mallorca Airport | Passenger | |
| Spain | San Sebastián | San Sebastián Airport | Seasonal | |
| Spain | Tenerife | Tenerife South Airport | Passenger | |
| Spain | Valencia | Valencia Airport | Passenger | |
| Spain | Zaragoza | Zaragoza Airport | Terminated | |
| Sri Lanka | Colombo | Bandaranaike International Airport | Seasonal | |
| Sudan | Khartoum | Khartoum International Airport | Terminated | |
| Sweden | Gothenburg | Göteborg Landvetter Airport | Passenger | |
| Sweden | Helsingborg | Ängelholm–Helsingborg Airport | Terminated | |
| Sweden | Malmö | Malmö Airport | Terminated | |
| Sweden | Norrköping | Norrköping Airport | Terminated | |
| Sweden | Stockholm | Stockholm Arlanda Airport | Passenger | |
| Switzerland | Bern | Bern Airport | Terminated | |
| Switzerland | Geneva | Geneva Airport | Passenger | |
| Switzerland | Lugano | Lugano Airport | Terminated | |
| Switzerland | Zurich | Zurich Airport | Passenger | |
| Switzerland; France; Germany | Basel; Mulhouse; Freiburg | EuroAirport Basel Mulhouse Freiburg | Passenger | |
| Syria | Aleppo | Aleppo International Airport | Terminated | |
| Syria | Damascus | Damascus International Airport | Terminated | |
| Taiwan | Taipei | Taoyuan International Airport | Terminated | |
| Tanzania | Dar es Salaam | Julius Nyerere International Airport | Terminated | |
| Tanzania | Kilimanjaro | Kilimanjaro International Airport | Resumes 29 May 2027 | |
| Tanzania | Zanzibar | Abeid Amani Karume International Airport | Begins 29 May 2027 | |
| Thailand | Bangkok | Don Mueang International Airport | Terminated | |
| Thailand | Bangkok | Suvarnabhumi Airport | Passenger | |
| Trinidad and Tobago | Port of Spain | Piarco International Airport | Passenger | |
| Trinidad and Tobago | Scarborough | A.N.R. Robinson International Airport | Passenger | |
| Tunisia | Tunis | Tunis–Carthage International Airport | Terminated | |
| Turkey | Ankara | Ankara Esenboğa Airport | Terminated | |
| Turkey | Antalya | Antalya Airport | Seasonal | |
| Turkey | Bodrum | Milas–Bodrum Airport | Seasonal | |
| Turkey | Dalaman | Dalaman Airport | Seasonal | |
| Turkey | Istanbul | Atatürk Airport | Airport closed | |
| Turkey | Istanbul | Istanbul Airport | Passenger | |
| Turkey | Istanbul | Sabiha Gökçen International Airport | Terminated | |
| Turkey | İzmir | İzmir Adnan Menderes Airport | Seasonal | |
| Turkmenistan | Ashgabat | Ashgabat International Airport | Terminated | |
| Turks and Caicos Islands | Providenciales | Providenciales International Airport | Passenger | |
| Uganda | Entebbe | Entebbe International Airport | Terminated | |
| Ukraine | Kyiv | Boryspil International Airport | Terminated | |
| United Arab Emirates | Abu Dhabi | Zayed International Airport | Passenger | |
| United Arab Emirates | Dubai | Dubai International Airport | Passenger + cargo | |
| United Kingdom | Aberdeen | Aberdeen Airport | Passenger | |
| United Kingdom | Barra | Barra Airport | Terminated | |
| United Kingdom | Belfast | Belfast City Airport | Passenger | |
| United Kingdom | Belfast | Belfast International Airport | Terminated | |
| United Kingdom | Benbecula | Benbecula Airport | Terminated | |
| United Kingdom | Birmingham | Birmingham Airport | Terminated | |
| United Kingdom | Blackpool | Blackpool Airport | Airport closed | |
| United Kingdom | Bournemouth | Bournemouth Airport | Terminated | |
| United Kingdom | Bristol | Bristol Airport | Terminated | |
| United Kingdom | Campbeltown | Campbeltown Airport | Terminated | |
| United Kingdom | Cardiff | Cardiff Airport | Terminated | |
| United Kingdom | Derry | City of Derry Airport | Terminated | (Note: The source lists Derry as Londonderry, but per the manual of style, the city is listed as Derry.) |
| United Kingdom | East Midlands | East Midlands Airport | Terminated | |
| United Kingdom | Eday | Eday Airport | Terminated | |
| United Kingdom | Edinburgh | Edinburgh Airport | Passenger | |
| United Kingdom | Exeter | Exeter Airport | Terminated | |
| United Kingdom | Fair Isle | Fair Isle Airport | Terminated | |
| United Kingdom | Glasgow | Glasgow Airport | Passenger | |
| United Kingdom | Glasgow | Glasgow Prestwick Airport | Terminated | |
| United Kingdom | Inverness | Inverness Airport | Passenger | |
| United Kingdom | Islay | Islay Airport | Terminated | |
| United Kingdom | Isles of Scilly | St Mary's Airport, Isles of Scilly | Terminated | |
| United Kingdom | Kirkwall | Kirkwall Airport | Terminated | |
| United Kingdom | Leeds / Bradford | Leeds Bradford Airport | Terminated | |
| United Kingdom | Liverpool | Liverpool John Lennon Airport | Terminated | |
| United Kingdom | London | Gatwick Airport | Hub | |
| United Kingdom | London | Heathrow Airport | Hub | |
| United Kingdom | London | London City Airport | Passenger | |
| United Kingdom | London | London Stansted Airport | Passenger | |
| United Kingdom | London | Luton Airport | Terminated | |
| United Kingdom | Manchester | Manchester Airport | Passenger | |
| United Kingdom | Newcastle upon Tyne | Newcastle International Airport | Passenger | |
| United Kingdom | Newquay | Newquay Airport | Terminated | |
| United Kingdom | North Ronaldsay | North Ronaldsay Airport | Terminated | |
| United Kingdom | Norwich | Norwich Airport | Terminated | |
| United Kingdom | Papa Westray | Papa Westray Airport | Terminated | |
| United Kingdom | Plymouth | Plymouth City Airport | Airport closed | |
| United Kingdom | Sanday | Sanday Airport | Terminated | |
| United Kingdom | Shetland Islands | Sumburgh Airport | Terminated | |
| United Kingdom | Southampton | Southampton Airport | Seasonal | |
| United Kingdom | Stornoway | Stornoway Airport | Terminated | |
| United Kingdom | Stronsay | Stronsay Airport | Terminated | |
| United Kingdom | Teesside | Teesside International Airport | Terminated | |
| United Kingdom | Tiree | Tiree Airport | Terminated | |
| United Kingdom | Westray | Westray Airport | Terminated | |
| United Kingdom | Wick | Wick Airport | Terminated | |
| United States | Anchorage | Ted Stevens Anchorage International Airport | Terminated | |
| United States | Atlanta | Hartsfield–Jackson Atlanta International Airport | Passenger + cargo | |
| United States | Austin | Austin–Bergstrom International Airport | Passenger | |
| United States | Baltimore | Baltimore/Washington International Airport | Passenger | |
| United States | Boston | Logan International Airport | Passenger | |
| United States | Charleston, SC | Charleston International Airport | Terminated | |
| United States | Charlotte | Charlotte Douglas International Airport | Terminated | |
| United States | Chicago | O'Hare International Airport | Passenger + cargo | |
| United States | Cincinnati | Cincinnati/Northern Kentucky International Airport | Passenger | |
| United States | Dallas | Dallas Fort Worth International Airport | Passenger | |
| United States | Denver | Denver International Airport | Passenger | |
| United States | Detroit | Detroit Metropolitan Wayne County Airport | Terminated | |
| United States | Fort Lauderdale | Fort Lauderdale–Hollywood International Airport | Terminated | |
| United States | Houston | George Bush Intercontinental Airport | Passenger + cargo | |
| United States | Las Vegas | Harry Reid International Airport | Passenger | |
| United States | Los Angeles | Los Angeles International Airport | Passenger | |
| United States | Miami | Miami International Airport | Passenger | |
| United States | Nashville | Nashville International Airport | Passenger | |
| United States | New Orleans | Louis Armstrong New Orleans International Airport | Passenger | |
| United States | New York City | John F. Kennedy International Airport | Passenger | |
| United States | Newark | Newark Liberty International Airport | Passenger | |
| United States | Oakland | Oakland San Francisco Bay Airport | Terminated | |
| United States | Orlando | Orlando International Airport | Passenger | |
| United States | Philadelphia | Philadelphia International Airport | Passenger | |
| United States | Phoenix | Phoenix Sky Harbor International Airport | Passenger | |
| United States | Pittsburgh | Pittsburgh International Airport | Passenger | |
| United States | Portland, OR | Portland International Airport | Passenger | |
| United States | St. Louis | St. Louis Lambert International Airport | Seasonal | |
| United States | San Diego | San Diego International Airport | Passenger | |
| United States | San Francisco | San Francisco International Airport | Passenger | |
| United States | San Jose, CA | San Jose International Airport | Terminated | |
| United States | Seattle | Seattle–Tacoma International Airport | Passenger | |
| United States | Tampa | Tampa International Airport | Passenger | |
| United States | Washington, D.C. | Dulles International Airport | Passenger | |
| Uzbekistan | Tashkent | Tashkent International Airport | Terminated | |
| Venezuela | Caracas | Simón Bolívar International Airport | Terminated | |
| Zambia | Lusaka | Kenneth Kaunda International Airport | Terminated | |
| Zimbabwe | Harare | Robert Gabriel Mugabe International Airport | Terminated | |
| Zimbabwe | Victoria Falls | Victoria Falls Airport | Terminated | |

== See also ==
- British Airways World Cargo
- Transport in the United Kingdom
