= List of Loganair destinations =

As of October 2026, Loganair serves the following destinations:

Country	City	Airport	Notes	Refs
Denmark	Esbjerg	Esbjerg Airport		
France	Bordeaux	Bordeaux Airport	Seasonal	
France	Paris	Paris Charles de Gaulle Airport	Seasonal	
Ireland	Donegal	Donegal Airport		
Ireland	Dublin	Dublin Airport		
Isle of Man	Ronaldsway	Isle of Man Airport	Hub	
Jersey	St Peter	Jersey Airport	Hub	
Norway	Bergen	Bergen Airport, Flesland	Seasonal	
Norway	Oslo	Oslo Airport, Gardermoen	Terminated	
Norway	Stavanger	Stavanger Airport	Terminated	
United Kingdom	Aberdeen	Aberdeen Airport	Hub	
United Kingdom	Barra	Barra Airport		
United Kingdom	Belfast	Belfast City Airport		
United Kingdom	Benbecula	Benbecula Airport		
United Kingdom	Birmingham	Birmingham Airport		
United Kingdom	Bristol	Bristol Airport		
United Kingdom	Campbeltown	Campbeltown Airport		
United Kingdom	Cardiff	Cardiff Airport	Terminated	
United Kingdom	Carlisle	Carlisle Lake District Airport	Terminated	
United Kingdom	Derry	City of Derry Airport	Hub	
United Kingdom	Dundee	Dundee Airport	Terminated	
United Kingdom	East Midlands	East Midlands Airport	Seasonal	
United Kingdom	Eday	Eday Airport		
United Kingdom	Edinburgh	Edinburgh Airport	Hub	
United Kingdom	Exeter	Exeter Airport		
United Kingdom	Glasgow	Glasgow Airport	Hub	
United Kingdom	Inverness	Inverness Airport	Hub	
United Kingdom	Islay	Islay Airport		
United Kingdom	Kirkwall	Kirkwall Airport	Hub	
United Kingdom	Liverpool	Liverpool John Lennon Airport		
United Kingdom	London	Heathrow Airport		
United Kingdom	London	London City Airport	Terminated	
United Kingdom	London	London Southend Airport	Terminated	
United Kingdom	London	London Stansted Airport	Terminated	
United Kingdom	Manchester	Manchester Airport		
United Kingdom	Newcastle upon Tyne	Newcastle International Airport		
United Kingdom	Newquay	Newquay Airport		
United Kingdom	North Ronaldsay	North Ronaldsay Airport		
United Kingdom	Norwich	Norwich Airport		
United Kingdom	Papa Westray	Papa Westray Airport		
United Kingdom	Sanday	Sanday Airport		
United Kingdom	Southampton	Southampton Airport		
United Kingdom	Stornoway	Stornoway Airport		
United Kingdom	Stronsay	Stronsay Airport		
United Kingdom	Sumburgh	Sumburgh Airport		
United Kingdom	Teesside	Teesside International Airport	Terminated	
United Kingdom	Tiree	Tiree Airport		
United Kingdom	Westray	Westray Airport		
United Kingdom	Wick	Wick Airport	Terminated	
