= EGPA =

EGPA may refer to:

- Kirkwall Airport, Orkney, Scotland, ICAO airport code EGPA
- Eosinophilic granulomatosis with polyangiitis, an extremely rare autoimmune condition
