= PPW =

PPW may refer to:

- the IATA code for Papa Westray Airport
- Performance per watt
- Power Pro Wrestling - Memphis, Tennessee based professional wrestling promotion
- Protracted people's war - Revolutionary combat theory developed by Mao Zedong
- Parody Pro wrestling - wrestling satirical news.
