= AHZ =

AHZ may refer to:

- Attohertz, in frequency measurement, 10^{−18} Hz
- Alpe d'Huez Airport's IATA designation
- Arnhem Zuid railway station's code
- Academy of Foreign Trade in Lwów or Akademia Handlu Zagranicznego
- Hungarian State Symphony Orchestra or Állami Hangverseny Zenekar
- Ahz, a fictional place in the 1981 episode "Scooby's Trip to Ahz" of Scooby-Doo and Scrappy-Doo

== See also ==
- A structure of the enzyme alcohol oxidase (PDB code 1AHZ)
