= Hailuoto Airfield =

Hailuoto Airfield Hailuodon lentokenttä
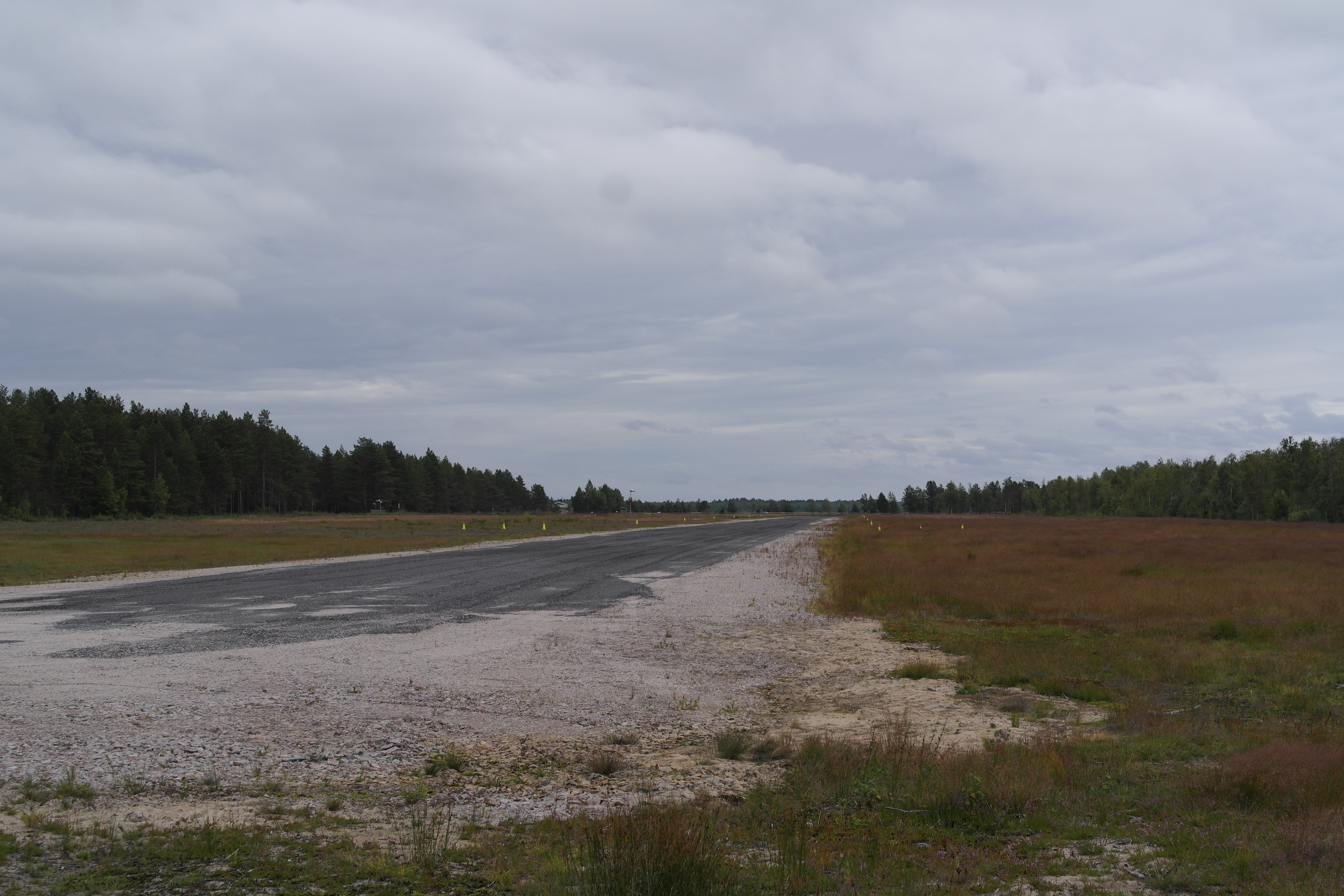
- IATA: none; ICAO: EFHL

Summary
- Operator: Municipality of Hailuoto
- Location: Hailuoto, Finland
- Elevation AMSL: 7 ft / 2 m
- Coordinates: 64°58′12″N 024°42′18″E

Map
- Location within Finland

Runways
Direction	Length		Surface
Direction	m	ft	Surface
06/24	500	1,640	sand/grass
- Source: VFR Finland

Hailuoto Airfield (Finnish: Hailuodon lentokenttä or Pöllän lentokenttä) is an airfield in Pöllä, Hailuoto, Finland, about 6 kilometres (4 mi) south of Hailuoto village.

== See also ==
- List of airports in Finland
- List of shortest runways
