= Westray to Papa Westray flight =

Shortest scheduled passenger flight in the world

- Operator: Loganair
- Distance travelled: 1.7 miles (2.7 km)

Aircraft properties
- Aircraft: Britten-Norman BN-2 Islander

Flight timeline
- Takeoff site: Papa Westray Airport; Westray Airport
- Landing site: Westray Airport; Papa Westray Airport

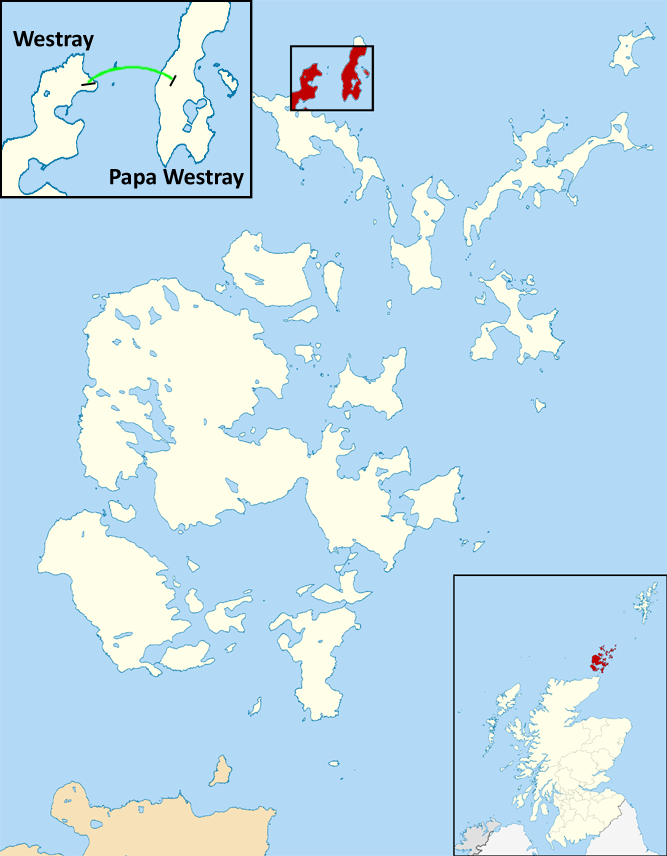
The flight goes between two islands in Orkney, Scotland: Westray and Papa Westray. At 2.7 kilometres (1.7 mi), it was launched in December 1967 and is the shortest scheduled airline flight in the world as of December 2025.

Loganair's Westray to Papa Westray route is the current shortest scheduled passenger flight in the world. Flights on the route are scheduled for one-and-a-half minutes, and actual flying time is closer to one minute. The record for the fastest flight is 53 seconds. The route is flown by Loganair, a Scottish regional airline that serves Scotland's Highlands and Islands.

== Background ==
With the completion of Papa Westray Airport's runway extension and removal of its stone walls in November 1967, the route was inaugurated by Loganair on 4 December 1967, establishing the record for the world's shortest scheduled commercial flights.

This route between the Orkney islands of Westray and Papa Westray in northern Scotland is part of Orkney's Inter-Islands air service which was launched in September 1967 with the initial connection of three of the Orkney islands. An additional route connected a fourth island, Westray, in October, and the addition of Papa Westray in December brought it up to five connected islands by the end of 1967. (Note: It would go on to add a sixth island, Eday, in May 1971.)

The Orkney Islands Council operates the route as a subsidised public service obligation and awards its operation, which along with the other routes connecting six of Orkney's islands forms Orkney's "Inter-Islands air service", through a public tendering process. The flights have been continuously operated by Loganair since their founding and in 2025 the contract was again awarded to Loganair for service through March 2029.

== Flights ==
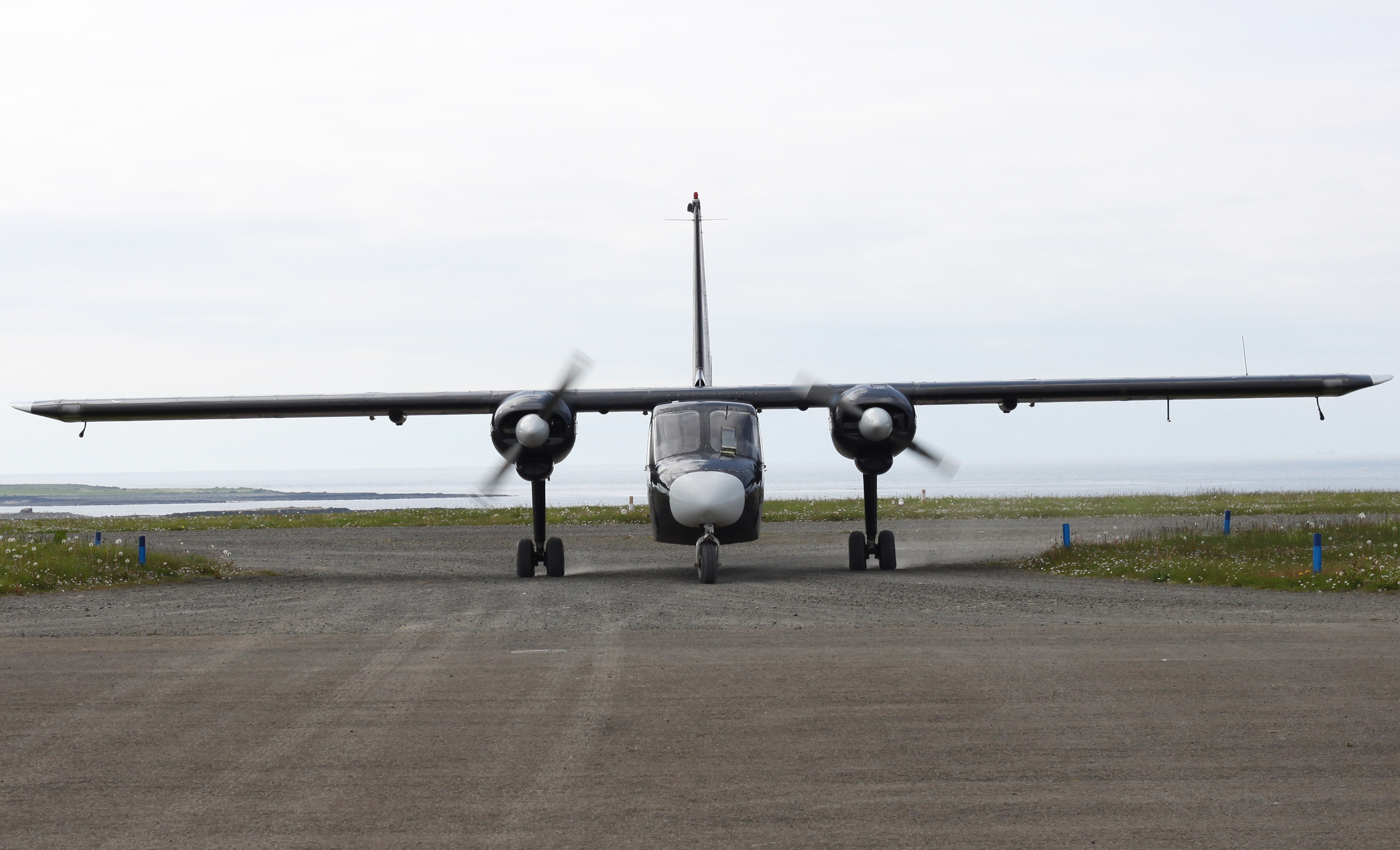
Loganair aircraft taxiing at Papa Westray airport

Flights between Westray Airport and Papa Westray Airport operate daily: bi-directional on weekdays and uni-directional on weekends. On Saturdays only flights from Westray to Papa Westray are available, and on Sunday, only flights from Papa Westray to Westray are available. The total distance covered by the flights is 1.7 miles (2.7 km), which is about the same length as the runway at Edinburgh Airport.

Stuart Linklater piloted the flight more than 12,000 times, more than any other pilot, before he retired in 2013. Linklater set the current record for the fastest flight between the islands at 53 seconds. (Note: Earlier self-reported record times include Captain Andy Alsop's record of 69 seconds (31 October 1974) and later 58 seconds (also by Captain Alsop))

=== Passengers ===
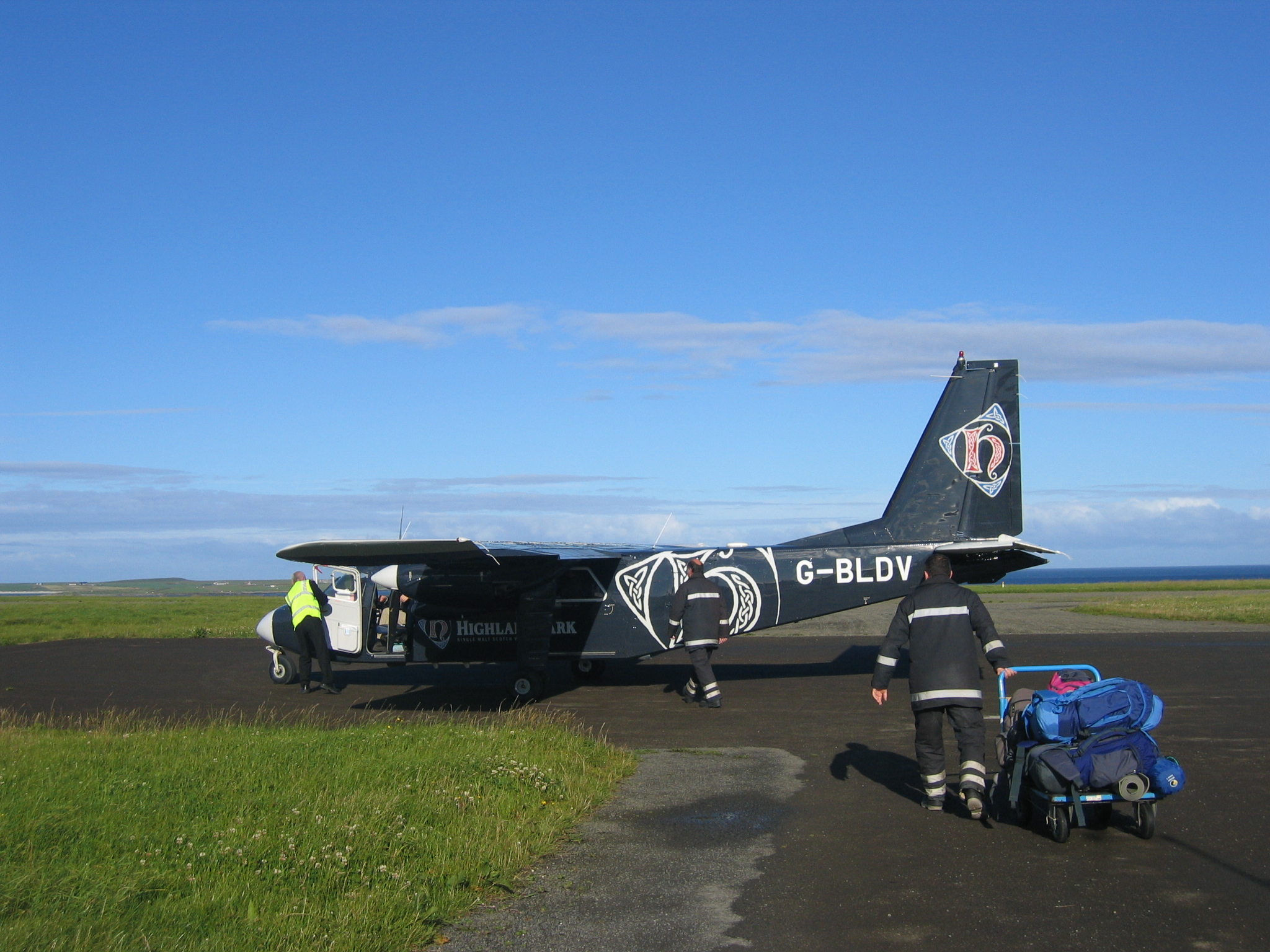
Britten-Norman Islander being loaded for departure from Papa Westray

Many students and their teachers take these flights to study the 60 archaeological sites on Papa Westray, making up the majority of passengers. Occasionally health professionals are needed to assist one of the island's 90 residents, and patients will also take the flight from Papa Westray to medical facilities when needed. The flight has also become popular among tourists.

As of 2024, the route sees an average of around 5000 passengers annually.

=== Aircraft ===
Since its launch in 1967, Loganair continues to operate this flight with one of its two Britten-Norman BN2B-26 Islander aircraft. The Islander is a high-wing, twin piston engine, propeller-driven aircraft. It is flown by a single pilot, and there is seating for eight passengers in the passenger cabin. One additional seat usually remains empty next to the pilot.

Loganair's chief executive, Jim Cameron, described the Islander as "robust" and "well suited to the vagaries of Scottish weather". Summarizing expert opinion of the Islander, Alastair Dalton of The Scotsman said the aircraft "had a good safety record and had proved versatile in operating from the shortest and roughest Highland runways".

In 2018, Loganair was planning to introduce electric aircraft to the Orkney Islands by 2021 due to the short distance between the islands that would make such flights possible. However, as of 2024, the BN-2 Islander is still operating the routes.

=== Flight numbers ===
The flight times and numbers change daily and repeat with a weekly cycle. Loganair Flight 702 departs from Westray Airport to Papa Westray Airport on Monday morning, and Flight 705 returns to Westray that afternoon. On Tuesdays, Thursdays, and Fridays, the flight number to Papa Westray is 709. The return flight number is 711. On Wednesday, Flight 714 goes to Papa Westray and the Flight 711 comes back to Westray. Flight 720 is the Saturday flight from Westray to Papa Westray, and on Sundays, Flight 726 is the return flight to Westray.

=== The future of the route ===
In 2014, Orkney Islands Council (OIC) held consultations regarding building a number of fixed links between seven of the Orkney Islands. This would include a bridge between Westray and Papa Westray. No such resulting actions were taken and in 2025 the OIC has said that these consultations were "exploratory in nature".

In 2025, the Scottish Government National Islands Plan was formally drafted and presented to parliament which includes the proposals to increase the number of ferries and aircraft dedicated to increasing Inter Islands service capacity. A third Britten-Norman Islander is now expected to brought into service (with updated timetables and potential increase to the Westray - Papa Westray flights) "by summer 2026".

There is a passenger ferry service between the islands also, with several daily departures per direction. They are around 3 miles (5 km) and last around 25 minutes. A car ferry usually runs twice a week.

== See also ==
- Singapore Airlines Flights 23 and 24 – longest scheduled passenger flight in the world
- Flight length
- Flight distance record
- Bryan Sutherland, engineer
