= Bryan Sutherland =

British engineer

Bryan Sutherland MBE
- Born: 1950 (age 75–76)
- Occupation: Engineer
- Years active: 1967–2017
- Known for: Career with Loganair
- Spouse: Dorothy Sutherland

Bryan James Sutherland (born 1950) is a British former engineer. For fifty years, he was in charge of operating the world's shortest scheduled airline flight, Loganair's two-minute-long Westray-to-Papa Westray route in Orkney, Scotland.

He is the airline's longest-serving employee, having worked for Loganair between 1967 and his 2017 retirement.

== Career ==
Sutherland joined Loganair on 17 July 1967, five years after the airline's formation. Beginning in Kirkwall, he spent a few years in Glasgow before returning to Orkney. He was then asked to set up the airline's base in the Outer Hebrides in 1975. He returned to Orkney permanently in 1978.

He planned to retire at the age of 65, but stayed on for two more years to achieve the fifty-year milestone.

== Personal life ==
Sutherland is married to Dorothy, with whom he has two daughters.

He was awarded an MBE in the Queen's 2018 New Year Honours. His nomination was submitted by Liam McArthur, member of the Scottish Parliament for the Orkney Islands.
