= Altiport =

Runway for small aircraft on mountainous terrain

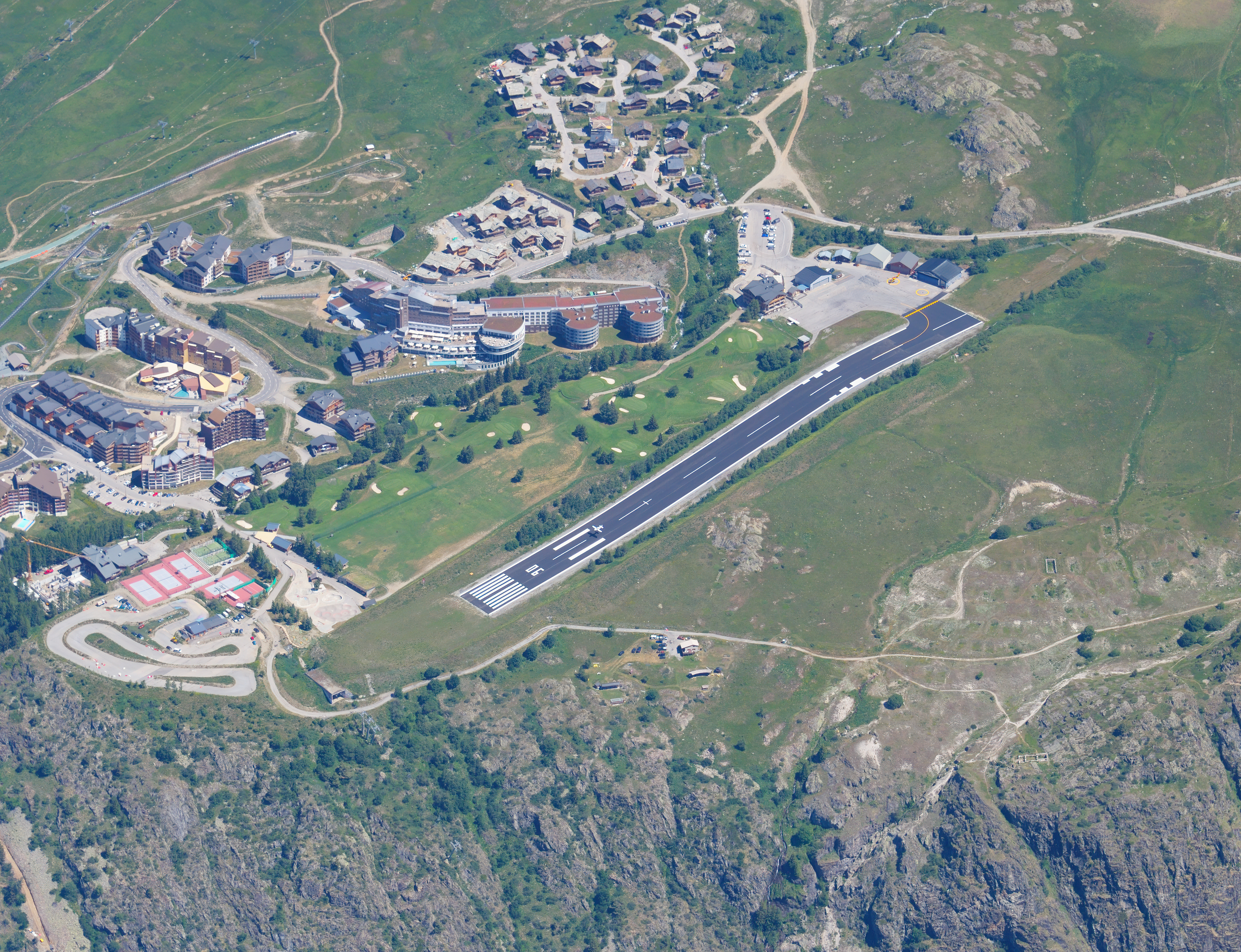
Alpe d'Huez Airport with sloped runway

An altiport is an aerodrome for small airplanes and helicopters, situated on or within mountainous terrain. Altiports are generally characterized by having a runway with an atypical slope to fit in the local topography. Ultimately, this slope helps aircraft decelerate when landing and assists acceleration during takeoff. High altitude results in less lift available to aircraft wings, which requires aircraft to achieve higher speed at takeoff and landing. Such airfields with unusual physical characteristics are frequent in regions such as the French Alps, Himalayan regions, as well as Pacific islands.

== Definitions ==
According to International Civil Aviation Organization (ICAO) Document 9150: STOLport Manual: "An altiport may be defined as a small airport in a mountainous area with a steep gradient runway, used for landing up the slope and for take-off down the slope, thereby making use of only one approach/departure area."

According to the former French Technical Instruction on Civil Aerodromes (ITAC) of 2000, an altiport is specifically designed for serving mountainous regions. It features a steep runway that has a single approach / departure path. The runway ends with a section that has a lower slope, as well as an apron with aircraft stands. An altisurface is defined as a graded area that is not an aerodrome but that can be used as a steep runway with a single approach / departure path.

== List of altiports ==
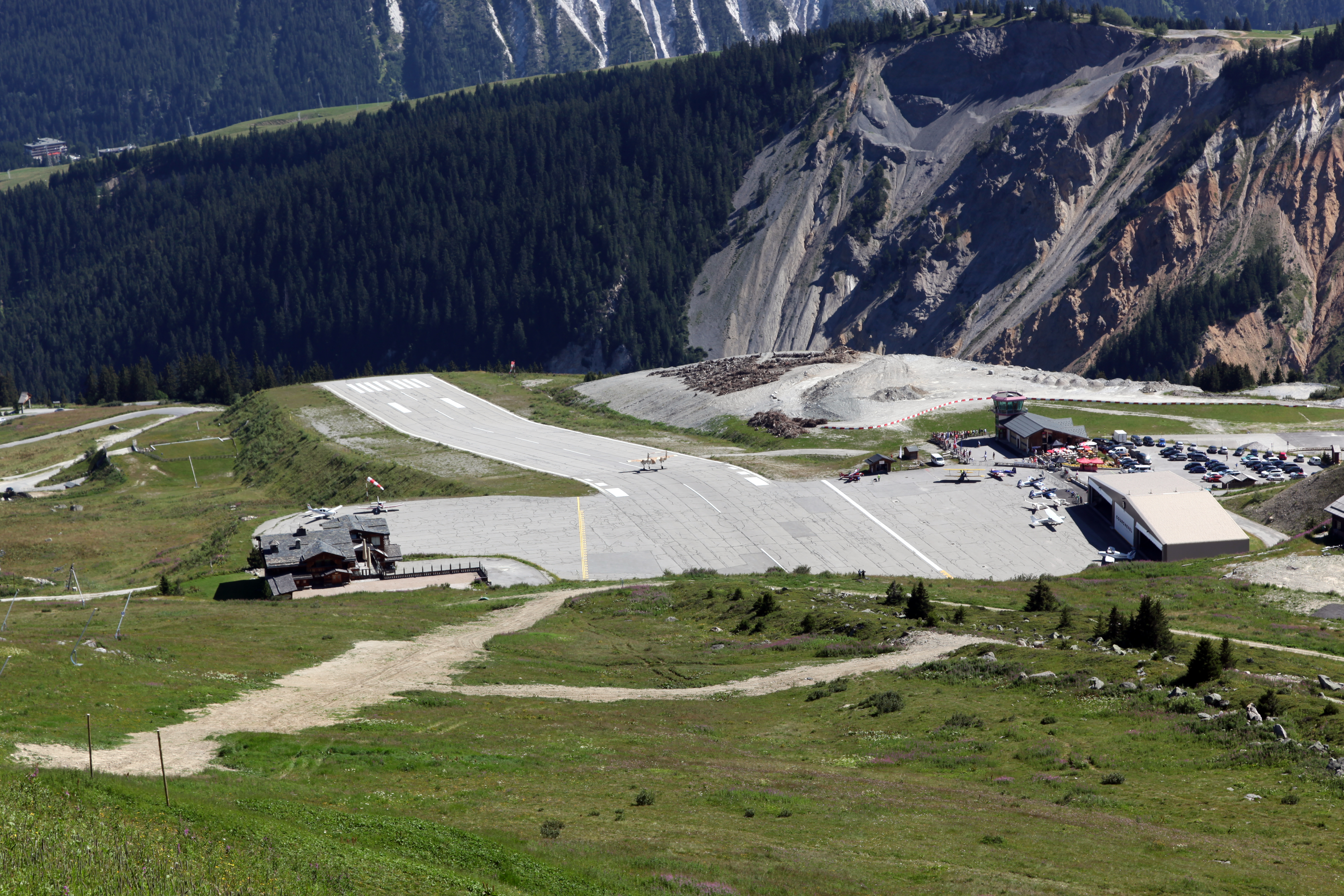
Courchevel Altiport, showing the sloped runway

Altiport	Country
Alpe d'Huez Airport	France
Courchevel Altiport	France
Corlier Aerodrome	France
La Motte-Chalancon Airport	France
Megève Altiport	France
Méribel Altiport	France
Peyresourde-Balestas Altiport	France
Ua Pou Airport	French Polynesia (France)
Koro Airport	Fiji
Lukla Airport	Nepal

== Notes ==
- Arrêté du 23 novembre 1962 relatif au classement des aérodromes suivant leur usage aéronautique et les conditions de leur utilisation (in French)
