= Big Creek, Idaho =

Unincorporated community in the state of Idaho, United States

Coordinates: 47°30′52″N 116°04′02″W

Big Creek is an unincorporated community in Shoshone County, Idaho, United States, outside the city of Kellogg. It is near where National Forest Develop Road 264 becomes Big Creek Road. The Shoshone Country Club was developed north of Big Creek.

== History ==
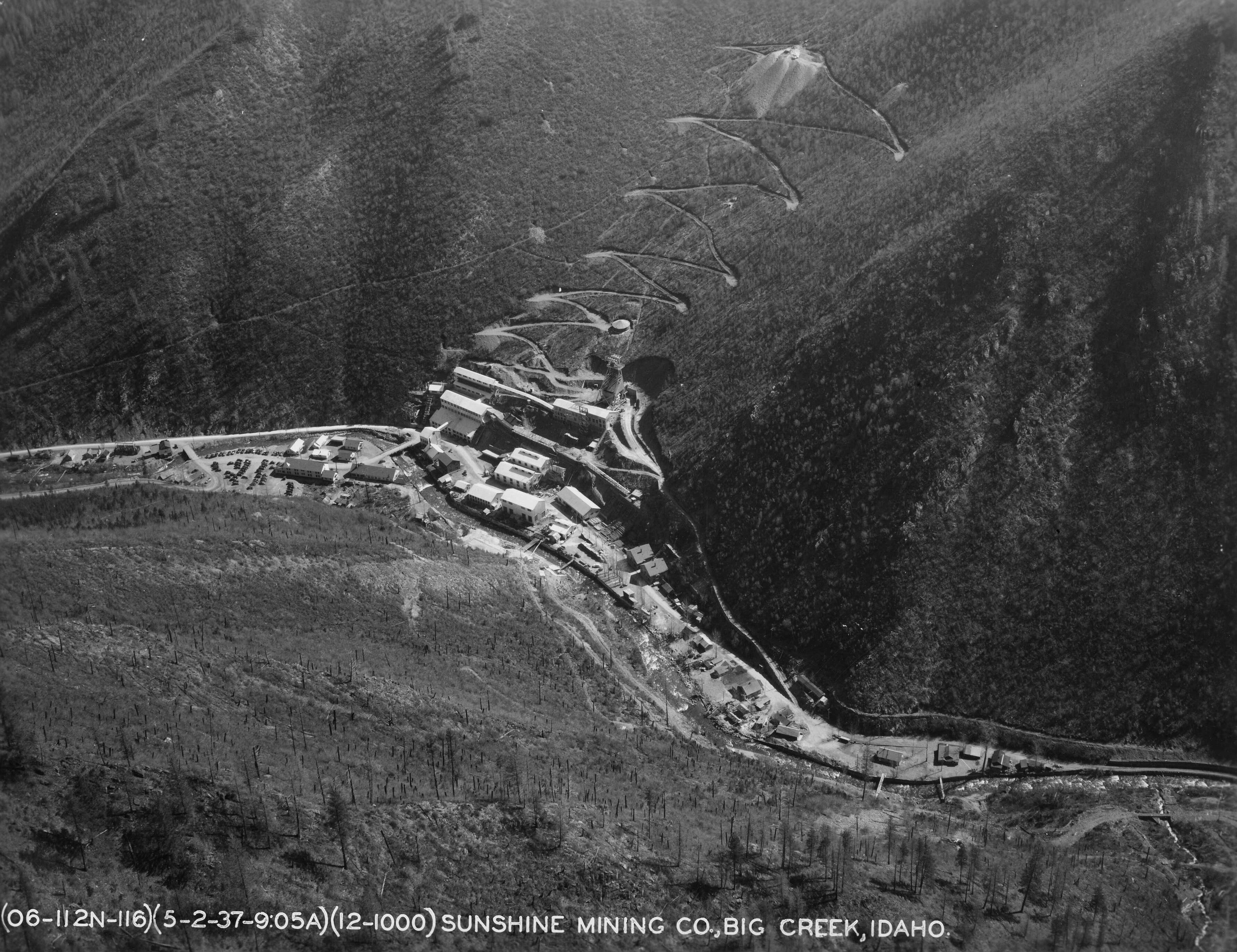
Sunshine Mining Co. 1938

Big Creek is the site of two large mines: the Crescent and Sunshine mines. The Sunshine mine is one of the largest producers of silver; it has produced more silver than the famous Comstock Lode in Nevada.

The community is associated to the ZIP code of Kellogg (83837). Big Creek's population was 31 in 1960. Mine workers lived outside the mine complex.

== Climate ==
This climatic region is typified by large seasonal temperature differences, with warm to hot (and often humid) summers and cold (sometimes severely cold) winters. According to the Köppen Climate Classification system, Big Creek has a humid continental climate, abbreviated "Dfb" on climate maps.
