= Corlier Aerodrome =

Altiport in the Ain department of France

Corlier Aerodrome Aérodrome de Corlier Altiport de Corlier
- IATA: none; ICAO: LFJD

Summary
- Airport type: Public
- Serves: Corlier, France
- Elevation AMSL: 2,762 ft / 842 m
- Coordinates: 46°02′23″N 005°29′48″E

Map
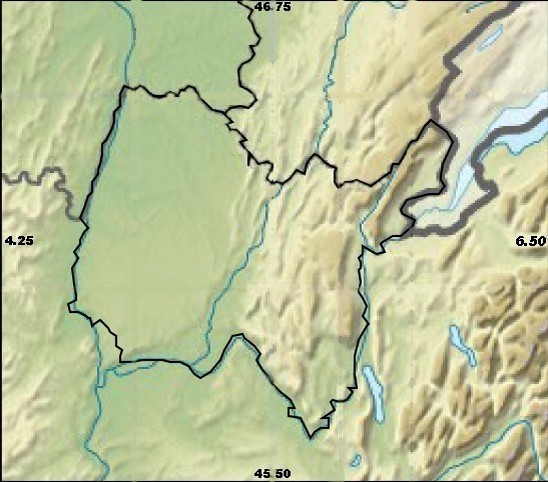
- Location of airport in Ain department Location of Ain department in France

Runways
Direction	Length		Surface
Direction	m	ft	Surface
	350	1,148	Grass
- Source: AIP France

Corlier Aerodrome (French: Aérodrome de Corlier) (ICAO: LFJD) is an altiport located 1.1 km (0.6 NM) north-northwest of Corlier, a commune in the Ain department of the Auvergne-Rhône-Alpes region in eastern France.

== Facilities ==
The airport resides at an elevation of 2,762 feet (842 m) above mean sea level. It has a grass runway which is 350 metres (1,148 ft) in length.
