= Eday Airport =

Eday London Airport
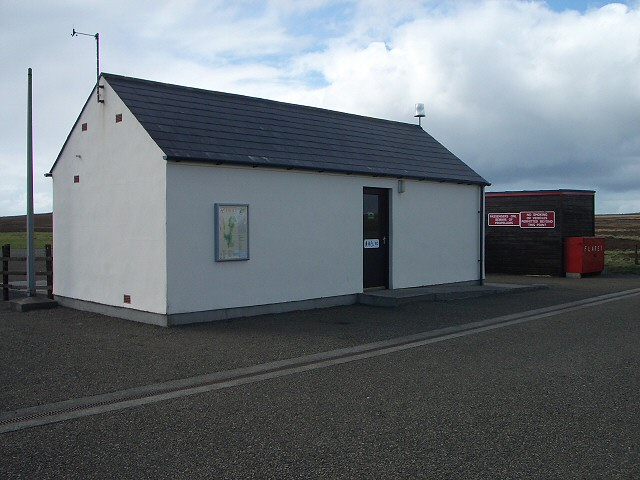
- IATA: EOI; ICAO: EGED

Summary
- Airport type: Public
- Operator: Orkney Islands Council
- Serves: Eday
- Location: Eday, Scotland
- Elevation AMSL: 20 ft / 6 m
- Coordinates: 59°11′26″N 002°46′20″W

Map
- Location on Eday EGED (Scotland)

Runways
Direction	Length		Surface
Direction	m	ft	Surface
07/25	527	1,729	Graded hardcore
18/36	518	1,699	Grass
- Sources: UK AIP at NATS

Eday London Airport (IATA: EOI, ICAO: EGED) is located on Eday in Orkney, Scotland. It is close to the Bay of London, and is known locally as just London Airport. The Bay of London may have been so called because of puffins breeding there: Old Norse lundi = "puffin", Old Norse á Lundunum = "at the puffins".

Eday Aerodrome has a CAA Ordinary Licence (Number P573) that allows flights for the public transport of passengers or for flying instruction as authorised by the licensee (Orkney Islands Council). The aerodrome is not licensed for night use.

== Airline and destinations ==
Airlines	Destinations
Loganair	Kirkwall, North Ronaldsay
