= Alpe d'Huez Airport =

Alpe d'Huez Airport Altiport de l'Alpe d'Huez
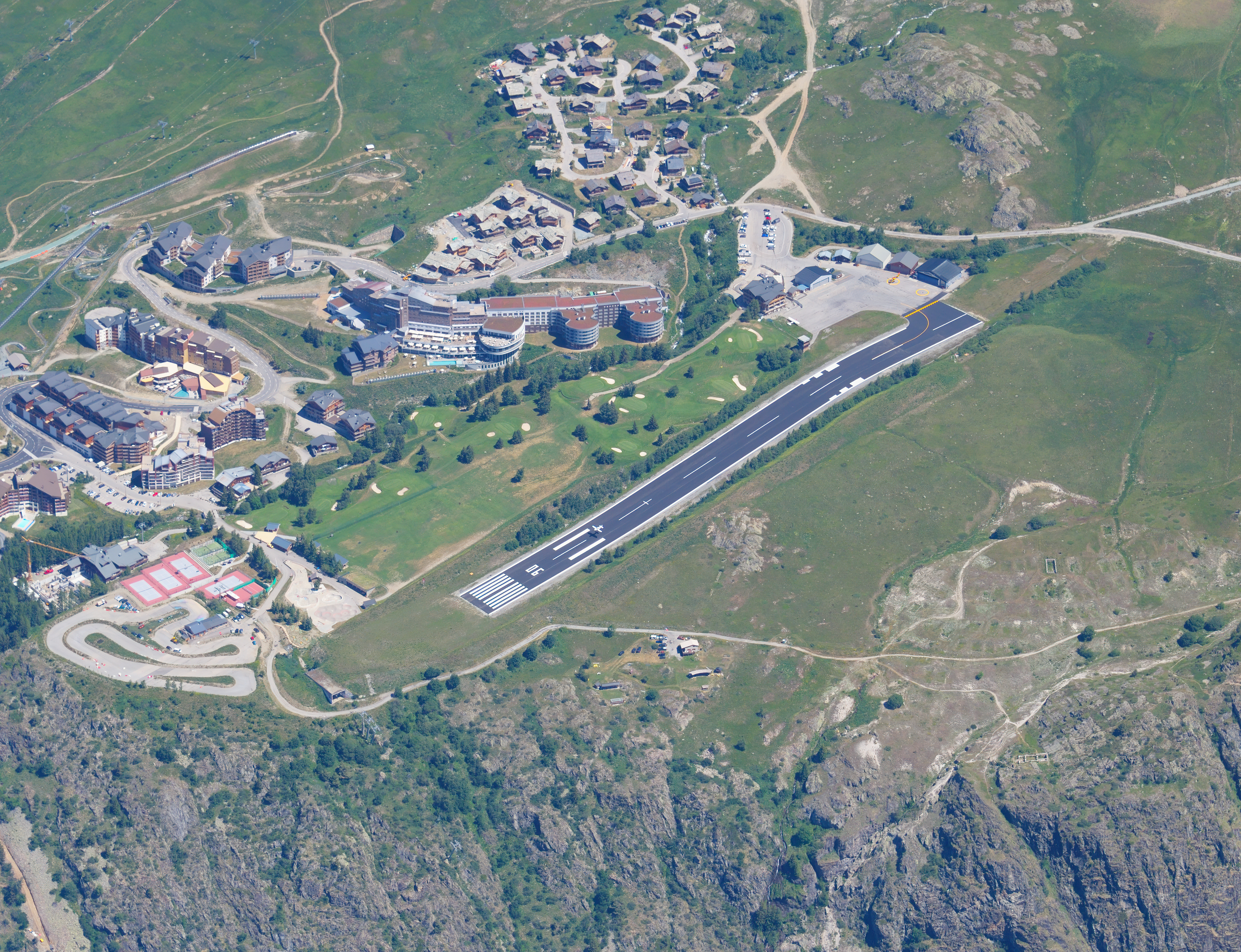
- IATA: AHZ; ICAO: LFHU

Summary
- Airport type: Public
- Serves: Alpe d'Huez, Rhône-Alpes, France
- Elevation AMSL: 1,840 m (6,040 ft)
- Coordinates: 45°05′16″N 006°05′06″E

Maps
- Rhône-Alpes region in France

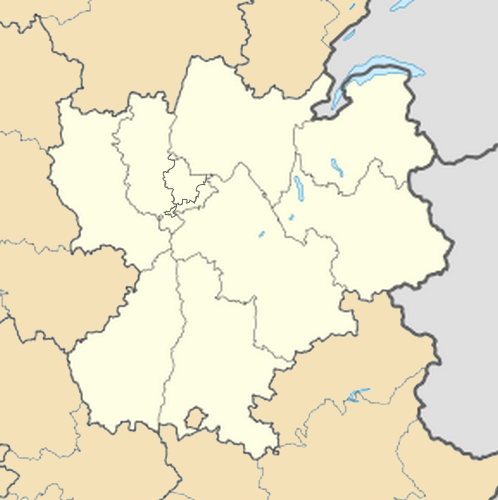
- Location of the airport in the Rhône-Alpes region

Runways
Direction	Length		Surface
Direction	m	ft	Surface
06/24	450	1,476	Asphalt
- Sources: GCM, STV

Alpe D'Huez Airport (IATA: AHZ, ICAO: LFHU) (French: Altiport de l'Alpe d'Huez) is a small altiport serving the town of L'Alpe d'Huez.
