= North Ronaldsay Airport =

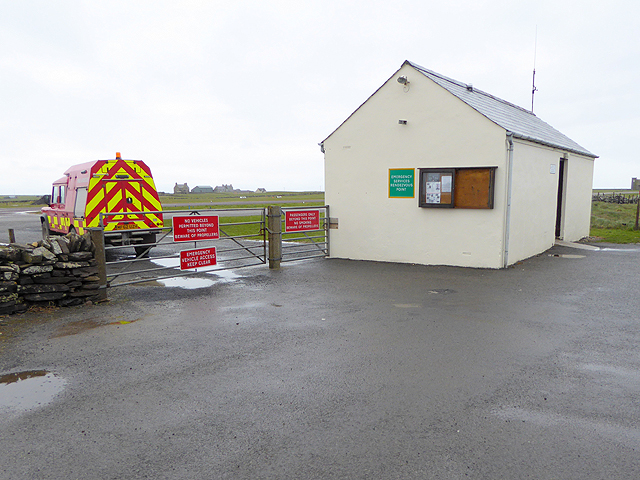
- IATA: NRL; ICAO: EGEN

Summary
- Airport type: Public
- Operator: Orkney Islands Council
- Serves: North Ronaldsay
- Location: North Ronaldsay, Orkney, Scotland
- Elevation AMSL: 56 ft / 17 m
- Coordinates: 59°22′03″N 002°26′04″W
- Website: www.orkney.com/explore/north-ronaldsay

Map
- Location in Orkney

Runways
Direction	Length		Surface
Direction	m	ft	Surface
03/21	331	1,086	Graded hardcore
10/28	527	1,729	Graded hardcore
14/32	304	997	Grass
- Sources: UK AIP at NATS

North Ronaldsay Airport (IATA: NRL, ICAO: EGEN) is located on North Ronaldsay island, 28 NM (52 km; 32 mi) northeast by north of Kirkwall, Orkney Islands, Scotland.

North Ronaldsay Aerodrome has a CAA Ordinary Licence (Number P538) that allows flights for the public transport of passengers or for flying instruction as authorised by the licensee (Orkney Islands Council). The aerodrome is not licensed for night use.

== Airline and destinations ==
Airlines	Destinations
Loganair	Eday, Kirkwall, Papa Westray, Sanday
