= Westray Airport =

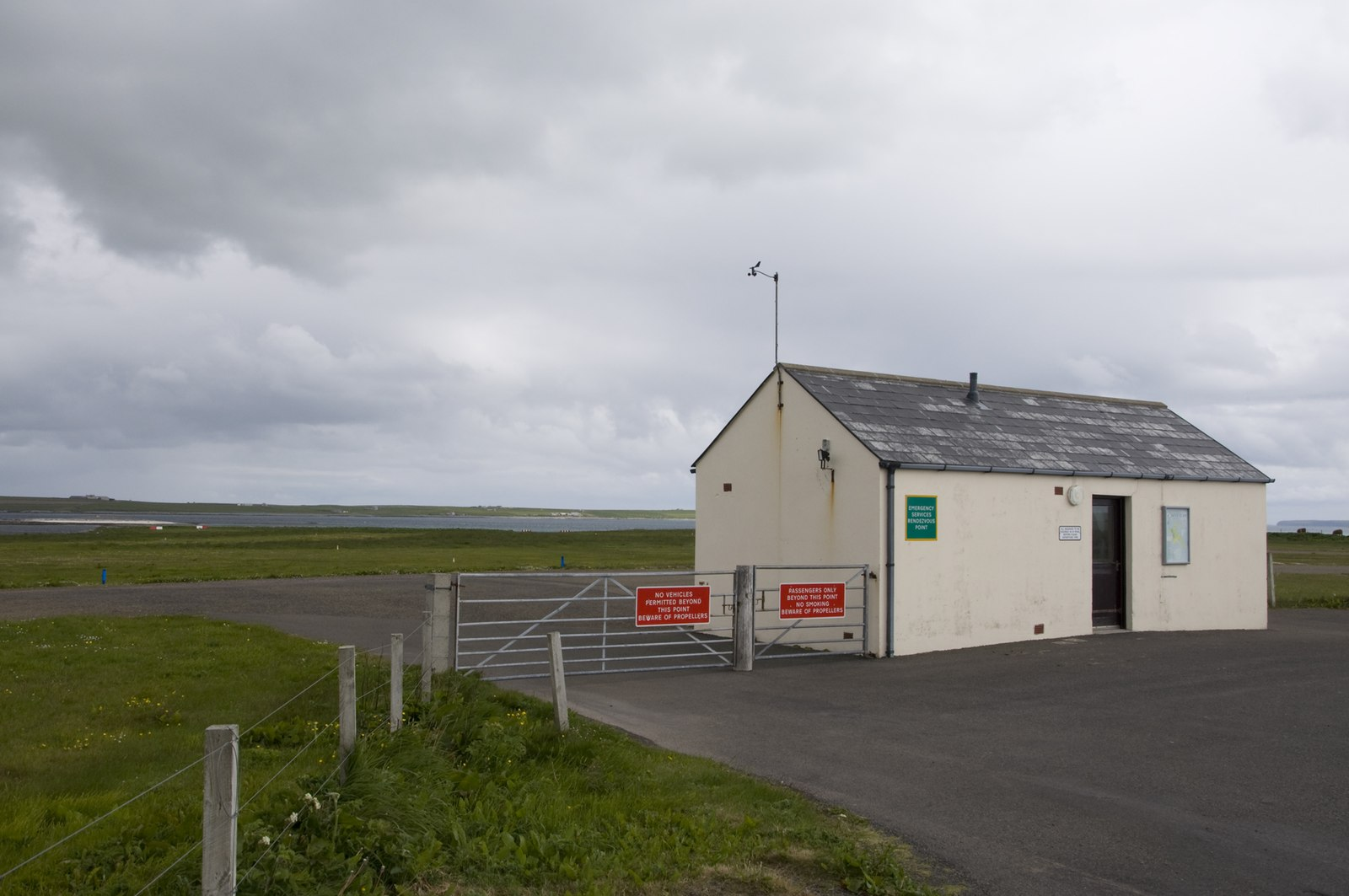
- IATA: WRY; ICAO: EGEW

Summary
- Airport type: Public
- Operator: Orkney Islands Council
- Location: Aikerness, Orkney, Scotland
- Elevation AMSL: 30 ft / 9 m
- Coordinates: 59°21′00″N 002°57′01″W
- Website: orkney.com

Map
- Location in Orkney EGEW (the United Kingdom)

Runways
Direction	Length		Surface
Direction	m	ft	Surface
09/27	527	1,729	Graded hardcore
13/31	457	1,499	Grass
- Sources: UK AIP at NATS

Westray Airport (IATA: WRY, ICAO: EGEW) is an airport at Aikerness, on Westray in the Orkney Islands, Scotland.

Westray Aerodrome has a CAA Ordinary Licence (Number P539) that allows flights for the public transport of passengers or for flying instruction as authorised by the licensee (Orkney Islands Council). It is also the start point for the European teams of the Greenland Air Trophy. The aerodrome is not licensed for night use.

== Airlines and destinations ==
Airlines	Destinations
Loganair	Kirkwall, Papa Westray

== Runway ==
Westray Airport is best known for the Loganair Westray to Papa Westray route being one of the shortest scheduled flight in the world, a leg of Loganair's inter-island service to Papa Westray Airport. The distance is 2.8 km (1.7 miles) and the scheduled flight time, including taxiing, is two minutes.

The airport was previously known for having the shortest commercial runway in the world with runway 01/19 having a declared LDA distance of just 234 m (768 ft). However, this runway is no longer in use.
