= Sanday Airport =

Airport in Scotland

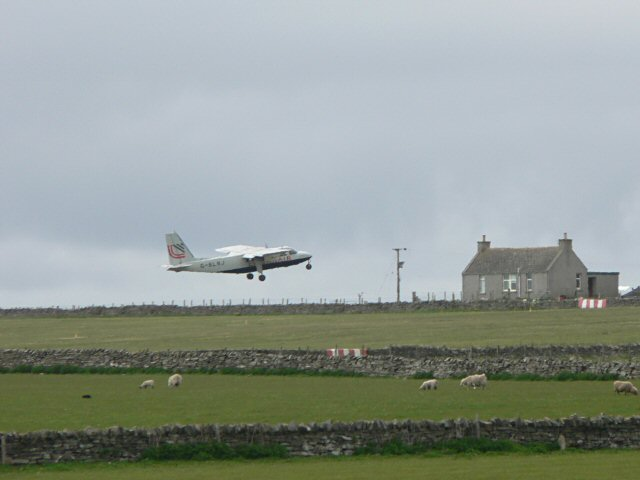
- IATA: NDY; ICAO: EGES

Summary
- Airport type: Public
- Operator: Orkney Islands Council
- Serves: Sanday
- Location: Sanday, Orkney, Scotland
- Elevation AMSL: 62 ft / 19 m
- Coordinates: 59°15′01″N 002°34′36″W

Map
- Location in Orkney

Runways
Direction	Length		Surface
Direction	m	ft	Surface
02/20	527	1,729	Graded hardcore
10/28	410	1,345	Grass
16/34	349	1,145	Grass
- Sources: UK AIP at NATS

Sanday Airport (IATA: NDY, ICAO: EGES) is located on Sanday, Orkney Islands, Scotland, 20 NM (37 km; 23 mi) north‑northeast of Kirkwall.

Sanday Aerodrome has a CAA Ordinary Licence (Number P541) that allows flights for the public transport of passengers or for flying instruction as authorised by the licensee (Orkney Islands Council). The aerodrome is not licensed for night use.

In 2017, a golden Islander plane made a special island-hopping flight from Kirkwall to five of Orkney's north isles. The flight marked the 50th anniversary of scheduled services operated by Loganair and during the trip it landed at Sanday before heading on to North Ronaldsay.

== Airline and destinations ==
Airlines	Destinations
Loganair	Kirkwall, North Ronaldsay, Stronsay
