= Kirkwall Airport =

Airport in Orkney, Scotland

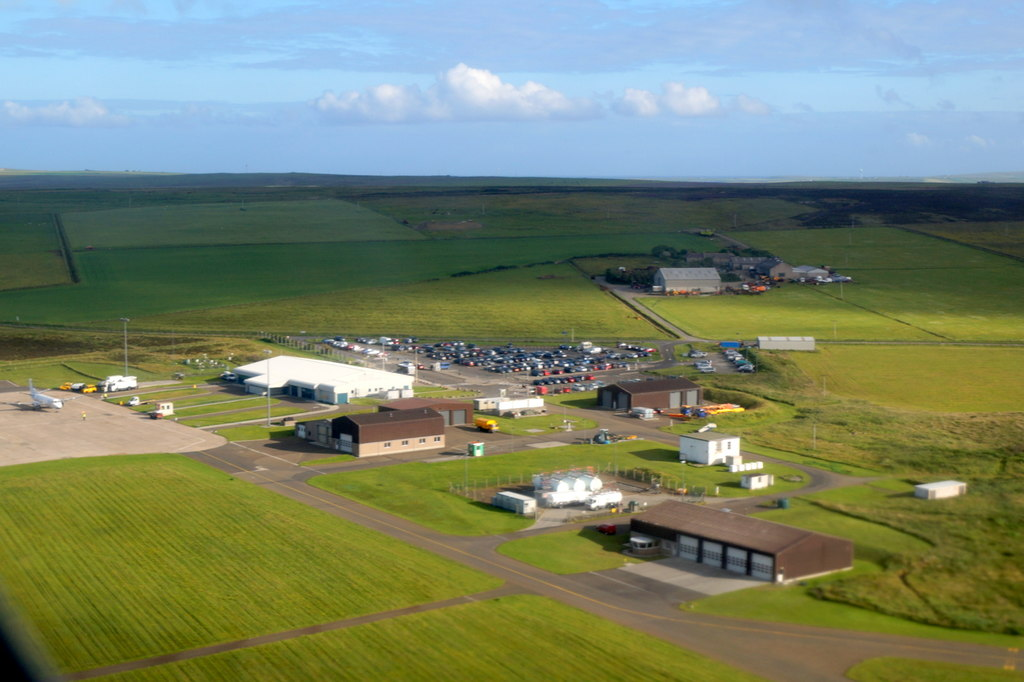
- IATA: KOI; ICAO: EGPA

Summary
- Airport type: Public
- Owner/Operator: HIAL
- Serves: Mainland, Orkney
- Location: Kirkwall, Scotland
- Elevation AMSL: 58 ft (18 m)
- Coordinates: 58°57′29″N 002°54′02″W
- Website: Kirkwall Airport

Map
- Location in Orkney

Runways
Direction	Length		Surface
Direction	m	ft	Surface
09/27	1,430	4,692	Grooved asphalt
14/32	677	2,221	Asphalt

Statistics (2025)
- Passengers: 157,051
- Passenger change 2024–25: ▲5%
- Air Transport Movements: 10,274
- Movements change 2024–25: ▲3%
- Sources: UK AIP at NATS; Statistics: UK Civil Aviation Authority

Kirkwall Airport (IATA: KOI, ICAO: EGPA) is the main airport serving Orkney in Scotland. It is located 3 miles (5 km) southeast of Kirkwall and is owned by Highlands and Islands Airports Limited. The airport is used by Loganair.

== History ==
=== Foundation ===
The airport was built and commissioned in 1940 as Royal Air Force Grimsetter, or simply RAF Grimsetter, for the defence of the Scapa Flow naval base. It took its name from the farm of Grimsetter, which the airfield was built over. In 1943, the Royal Navy took over the airbase and it was known as Royal Naval Air Station Grimsetter, commonly referred to as RNAS Grimsetter, later commissioned as HMS Robin and used by the Fleet Air Arm. Control passed in 1948 to the Ministry of Civil Aviation and in 1986 to Highlands and Islands Airports.

=== Royal Air Force ===
The following RAF units were here at some point:

- No. 129 Squadron RAF (1942–43)
- No. 132 Squadron RAF (1942)
- No. 234 Squadron RAF (1943)
- No. 2704 Squadron RAF Regiment
- No. 2766 Squadron RAF Regiment

=== Royal Navy ===
On 6 July 1943, RAF Grimsetter was transferred on loan to the Admiralty. The Royal Navy labelled it Royal Naval Air Station Grimsetter, more commonly known as RNAS Grimsetter. On 15 August, it was commissioned as HMS Robin, as a satellite to RNAS Hatston (HMS Sparrowhawk), located 1 mile (1.6 km) to the north west of Kirkwall.

The following Fleet Air Arm units were here at some point:

- 800 Naval Air Squadron
- 801 Naval Air Squadron
- 807 Naval Air Squadron
- 824 Naval Air Squadron
- 825 Naval Air Squadron
- 825X Naval Air Squadron
- 826 Naval Air Squadron
- 841 Naval Air Squadron
- 842 Naval Air Squadron
- 846 Naval Air Squadron
- 848 Naval Air Squadron
- 849 Naval Air Squadron
- 880 Naval Air Squadron
- 881 Naval Air Squadron
- 882 Naval Air Squadron
- 884 Naval Air Squadron
- 887 Naval Air Squadron
- 894 Naval Air Squadron
- 899 Naval Air Squadron
- 1770 Naval Air Squadron
- 1834 Naval Air Squadron
- 1840 Naval Air Squadron

== Airlines and destinations ==
Airlines	Destinations
Loganair	Aberdeen, Edinburgh, Glasgow, Inverness, Sumburgh, Eday, North Ronaldsay, Papa Westray, Sanday, Stronsay, Westray, Belfast–City, (Note: Belfast–City service is a continuation of the Inverness service as the same flight number) Manchester (Note: Manchester service is a continuation of the Inverness service as the same flight number); Seasonal: Bergen (Note: Bergen service is a continuation of the Sumburgh service as the same flight number)

=== Cargo ===
Airlines	Destinations
Loganair	Glasgow, Sumburgh

== Statistics and traffic ==
=== Annual traffic statistics ===
Traffic statistics at Kirkwall Airport
Year	Terminal and transit passengers (Note: CAA Table 09)		Air transport movements (Note: CAA Table 4.1)		
Year	Passengers	% change	Movements	% change	Notes
2015	160,234	Steady	10,701	Steady	
2016	163,029	▲2%	11,045	▲3%	
2017	177,248	▲9%	12,008	▲9%	
2018	181,562	▲2%	11,840	▼1%	
2019	172,625	▼5%	11,256	▼5%	
2020	61,177	▼65%	7,452	▼34%	
2021	85,665	▲40%	8,446	▲13%	
2022	133,410	▲56%	9,881	▲17%	
2023	143,093	▲7%	10,320	▲4%	
2024	149,503	▲4%	10,011	▼3%	
2025	157,051	▲5%	10,274	▲3%	

=== Busiest routes ===
Busiest routes to and from Kirkwall (2025)
Rank	Airport	Passengers	Change 2024–25
1	Aberdeen	42,881	▲12%
2	Edinburgh	41,962	▲16%
3	Glasgow	22,275	▲7%
4	Sumburgh	7,305	▼11%
5	North Ronaldsay	6.199	▼7%
6	Papa Westray	4,631	▼2%
7	Westray	3,153	▼6%
8	Stronsay	2,974	▼1%
9	Sanday	2,868	▼5%
10	London Heathrow	2,585	▼6%

== Accidents and incidents ==
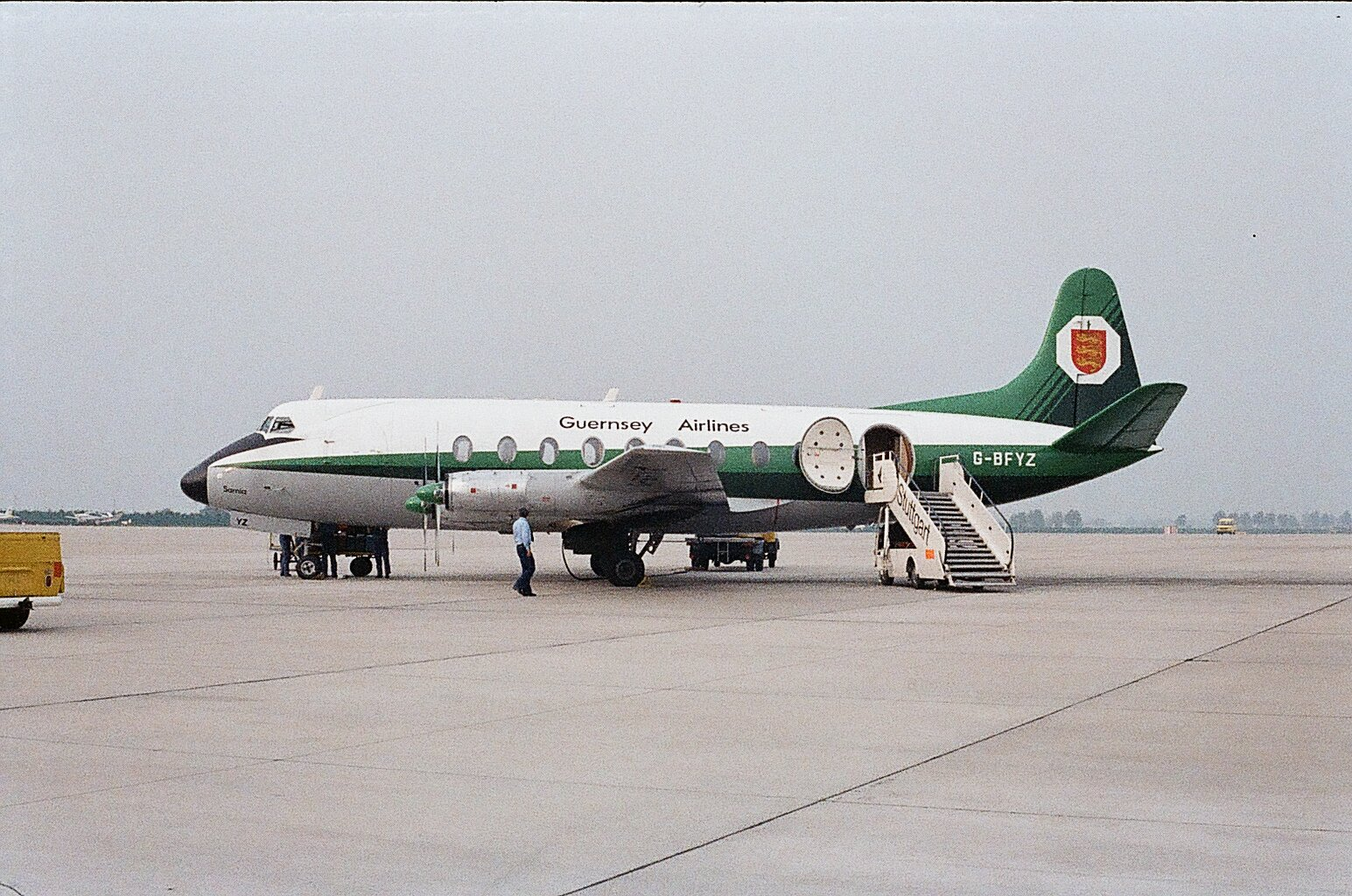
Vickers Viscount G-BFYZ damaged 1979 at Kirkwall (seen in Stuttgart, earlier in 1979)

- 25 October 1979 – A Vickers Viscount G-BFYZ of Alidair was damaged beyond economic repair when the aircraft departed the runway after #4 propeller struck the runway. The nosewheel collapsed when the aircraft reached an intersecting runway.
- 4 January 2025 - A man was jailed after repeatedly telling airport staff a friend of his was going to hijack an airplane and crash it into the airport. The threats were deemed 'not credible' by airport security.

== Green energy ==
Hydrogen production by electrolysis of water was well under way in late 2020 in Orkney, where clean energy sources (wind, waves, tides) were generating excess electricity that could be used to produce hydrogen gas (H_{2}). A plan was under way at Kirkwall Airport to add a hydrogen combustion engine system to the heating system in order to reduce the significant emissions that were created with older technology that heated buildings and water. This was part of the plan formulated by the Scottish government for the Highlands and Islands "to become the world's first net zero aviation region by 2040".

== Artwork ==
The signage on the airport's terminal roof is written in runes. The symbols spell the word 'Krimsitir' or 'Grimsetter', the name of the bay next to which the airfield is located, which was similarly the name of the former RAF base and the name of the farm upon which the airfield was built.
