= Stronsay Airport =

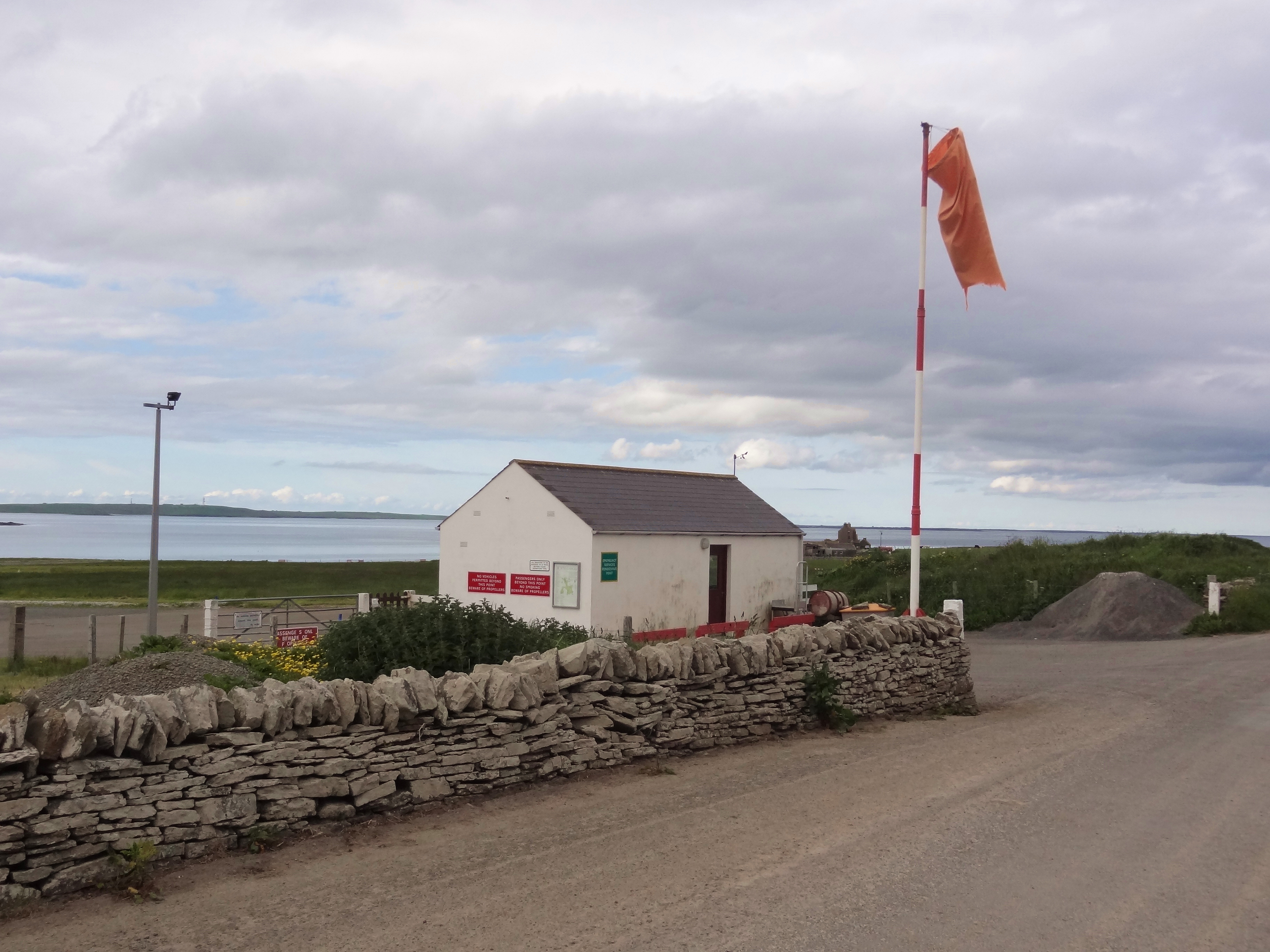
- IATA: SOY; ICAO: EGER

Summary
- Airport type: Public
- Operator: Orkney Islands Council
- Serves: Stronsay
- Location: Stronsay, Orkney, Scotland
- Elevation AMSL: 39 ft / 12 m
- Coordinates: 59°09′19″N 002°38′29″W
- Website: orkney.com

Map
- Location in Orkney

Runways
Direction	Length		Surface
Direction	m	ft	Surface
02/20	515	1,690	Graded hardcore
10/28	331	1,086	Grass
- Sources: UK AIP at NATS

Stronsay Airport (IATA: SOY, ICAO: EGER) is located on Stronsay, Orkney Islands, Scotland, 15 nautical miles (28 km; 17 mi) north‑northeast of Kirkwall.

Stronsay Aerodrome has a CAA Ordinary Licence (Number P540) that allows flights for the public transport of passengers or for flying instruction as authorised by the licensee (Orkney Islands Council). The aerodrome is not licensed for night use.

== Airline and destinations ==
Airlines	Destinations
Loganair	Kirkwall, Sanday
