= Papa Westray Airport =

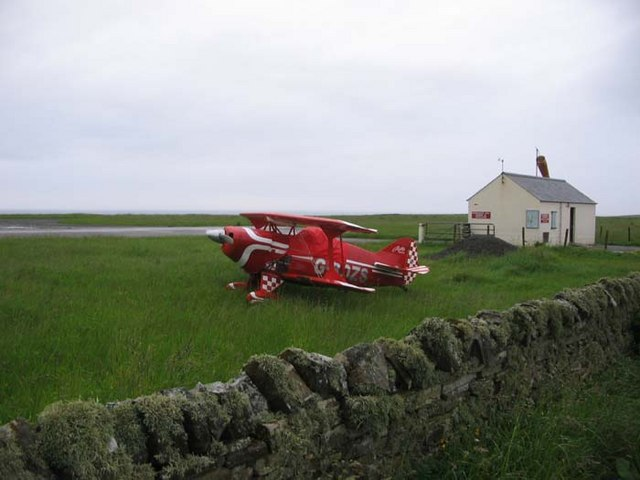
- IATA: PPW; ICAO: EGEP

Summary
- Airport type: Public
- Operator: Orkney Islands Council
- Serves: Papa Westray
- Location: Papa Westray, Orkney, Scotland
- Elevation AMSL: 92 ft (28 m)
- Coordinates: 59°21′04″N 002°54′01″W
- Website: orkney.com

Map
- Location in Orkney EGEP (the United Kingdom)

Runways
Direction	Length		Surface
Direction	m	ft	Surface
03/21	527	1,729	Graded hardcore
06/24	293	961	Graded hardcore
17/35	406	1,332	Grass
- Sources: UK AIP at NATS

Papa Westray Airport (IATA: PPW, ICAO: EGEP) is located on Papa Westray, Orkney Islands, Scotland, 24 NM (44 km; 28 mi) north of Kirkwall. The facility is best known for being one of the two airports joined by the shortest scheduled flight in the world, a leg of Loganair's inter-island service, to Westray Airport. The distance is 2.8 km (1.7 mi) and the scheduled flight time, including taxiing, is two minutes.

Papa Westray Aerodrome has a CAA Ordinary Licence (Number P542) that allows flights for the public transport of passengers and for flying instruction as authorised by the licensee (Orkney Islands Council). The aerodrome is not licensed for night use.

In March 2025 The Economist sought out readers to share their favourite airports with the publication. Stephanie Mitchell brought PPW to readers' attention by claiming that "...when it comes to most wonderful airports the honour must go to one or both of Papa Westray in Orkney or Barra in the Hebrides. No danger of feeling like a sheep in the crowd in either one, although either probably offers close proximity to actual sheep."

== Airline and destinations ==
Airlines	Destinations
Loganair	Kirkwall, North Ronaldsay, Westray
