= Glenrothes =

Coordinates: 56.198°N 3.178°W

Glenrothes: Scottish Gaelic: Gleann Rathais; Scots: Glenrothes
- Administrative centre and town
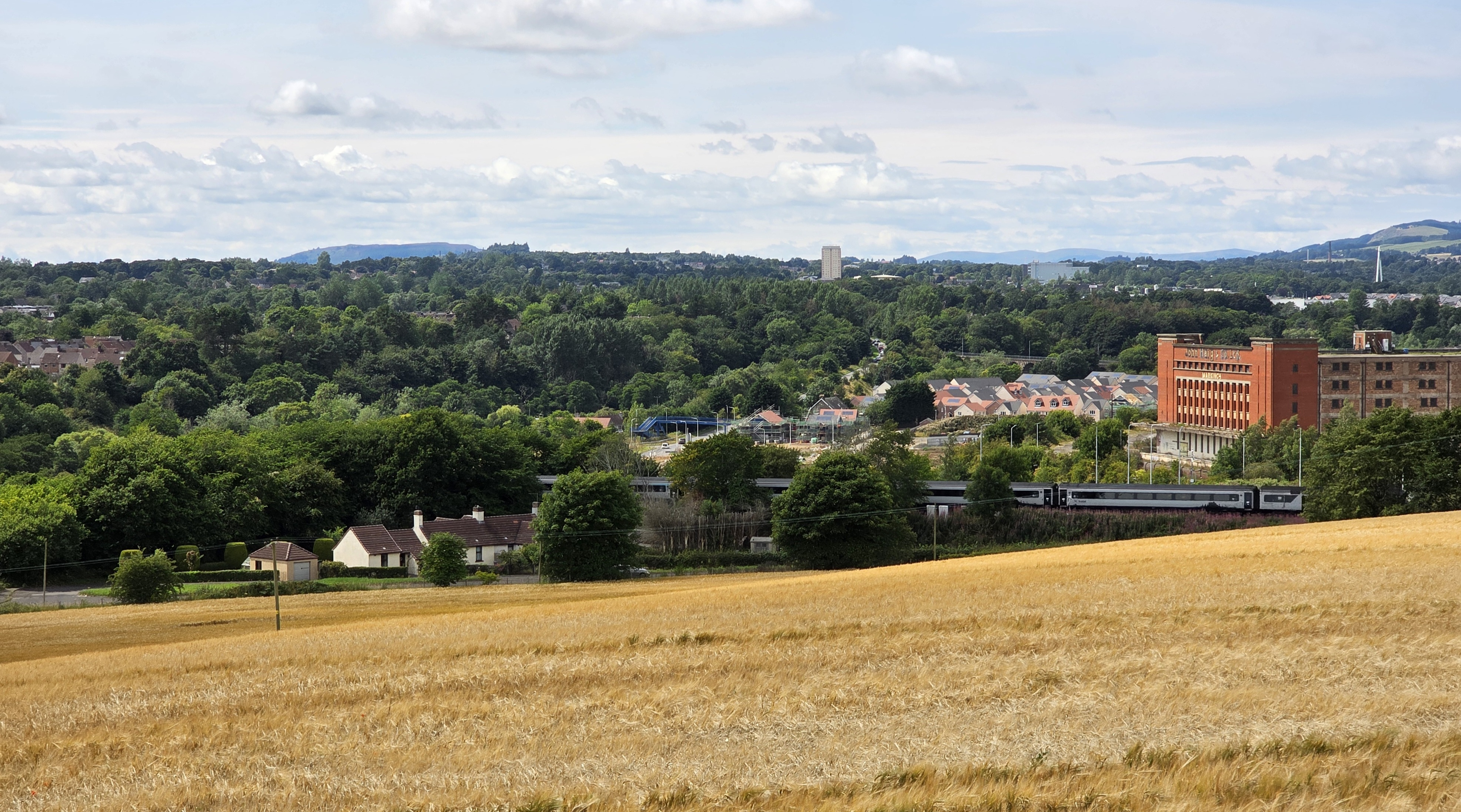
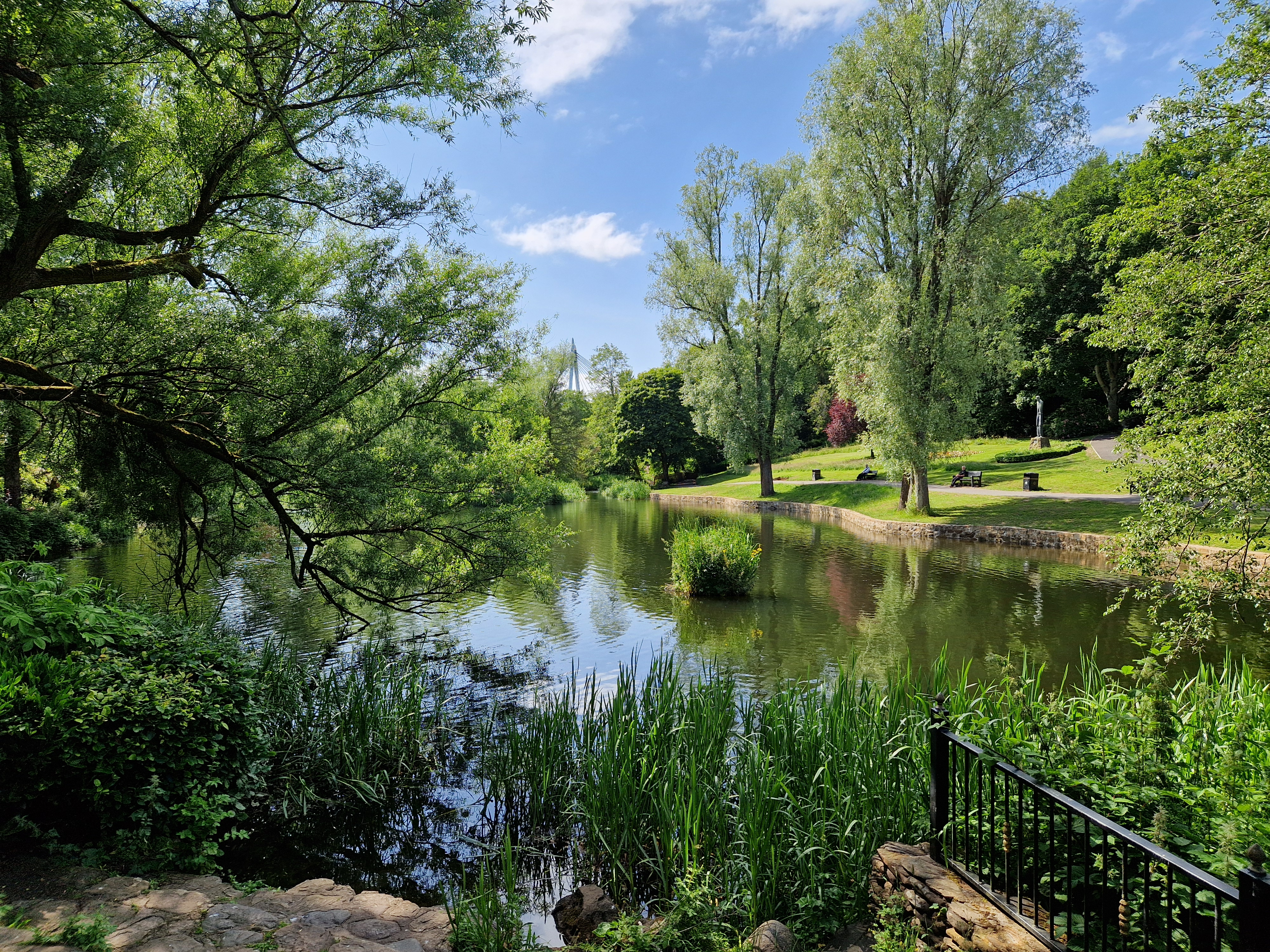
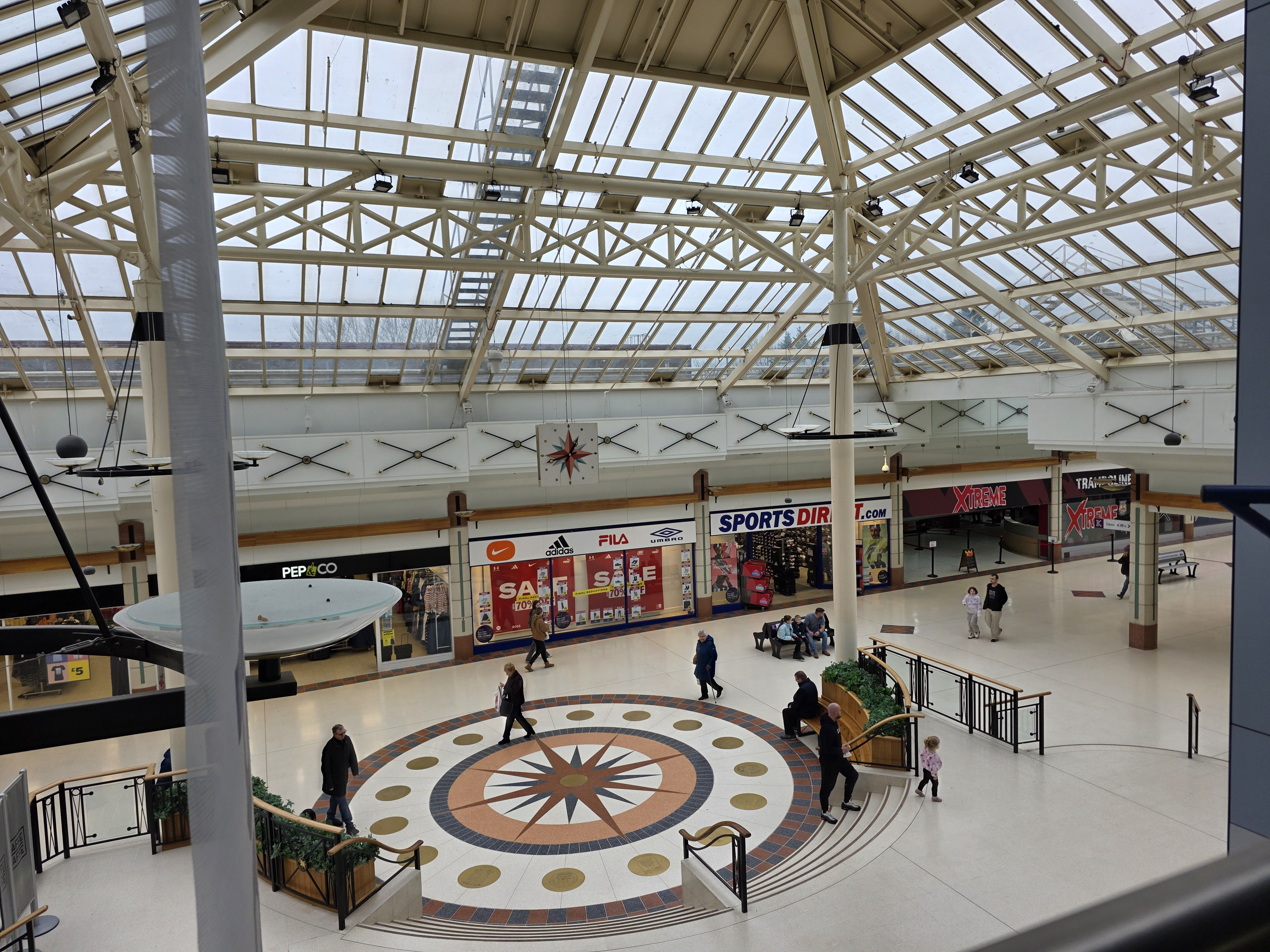
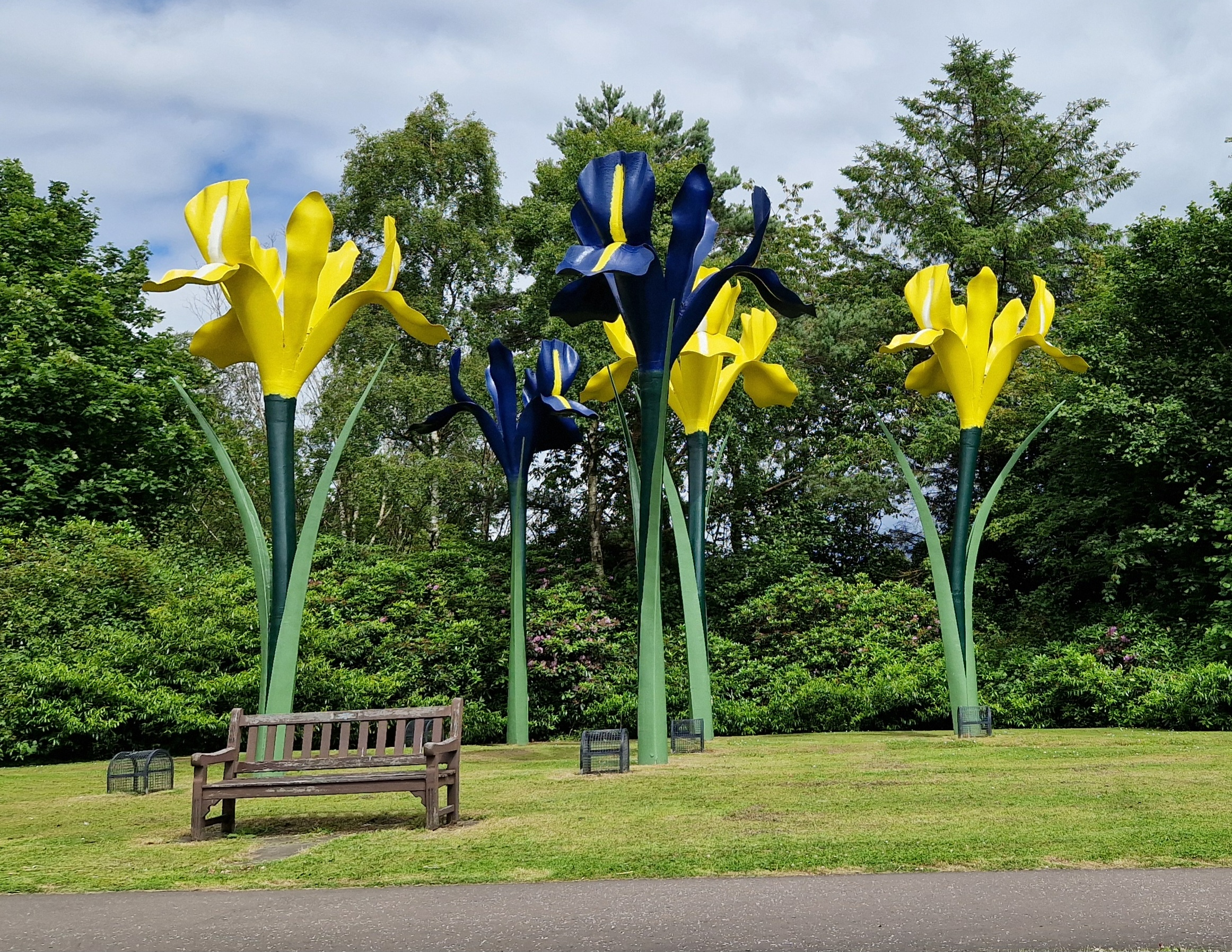
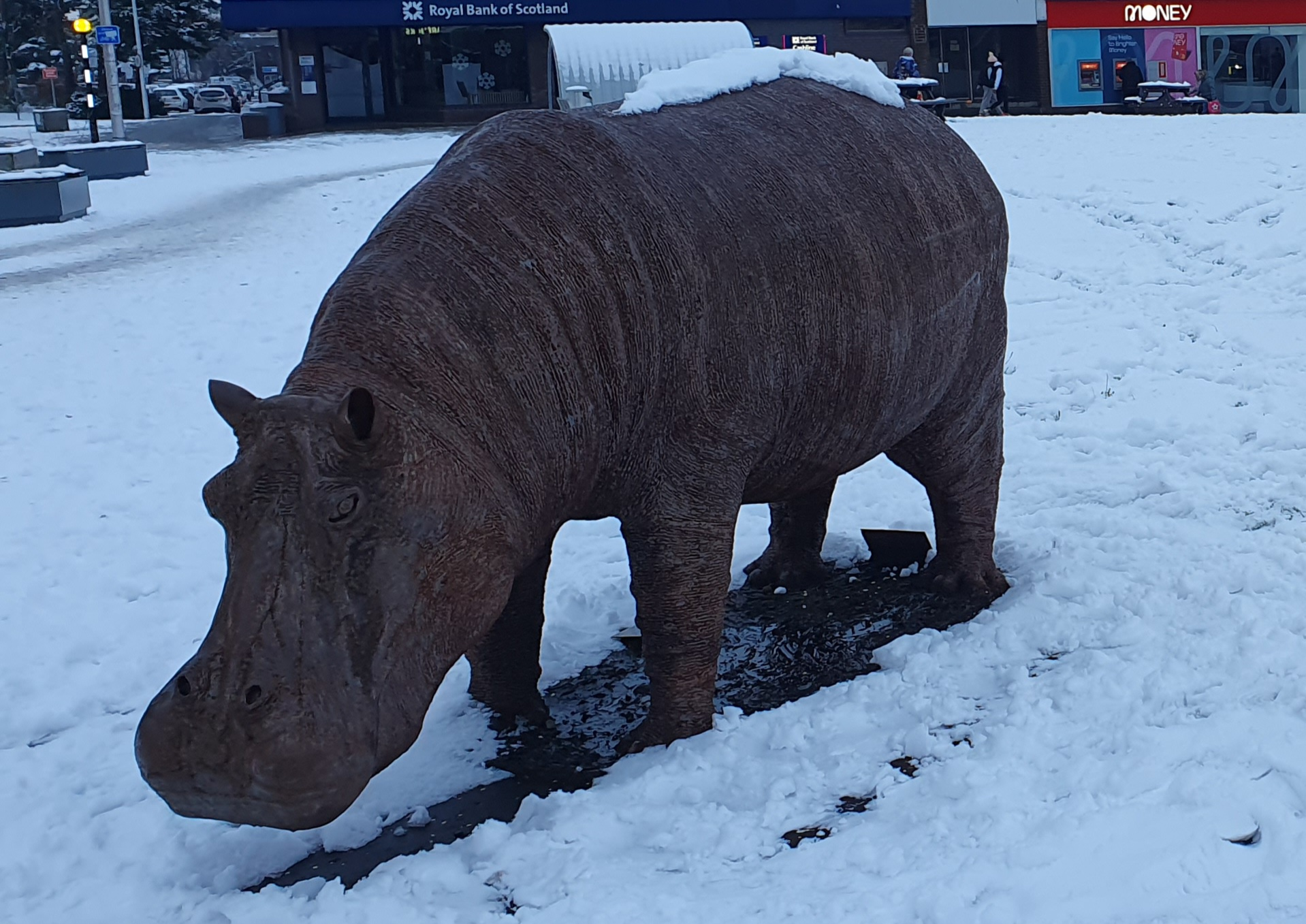
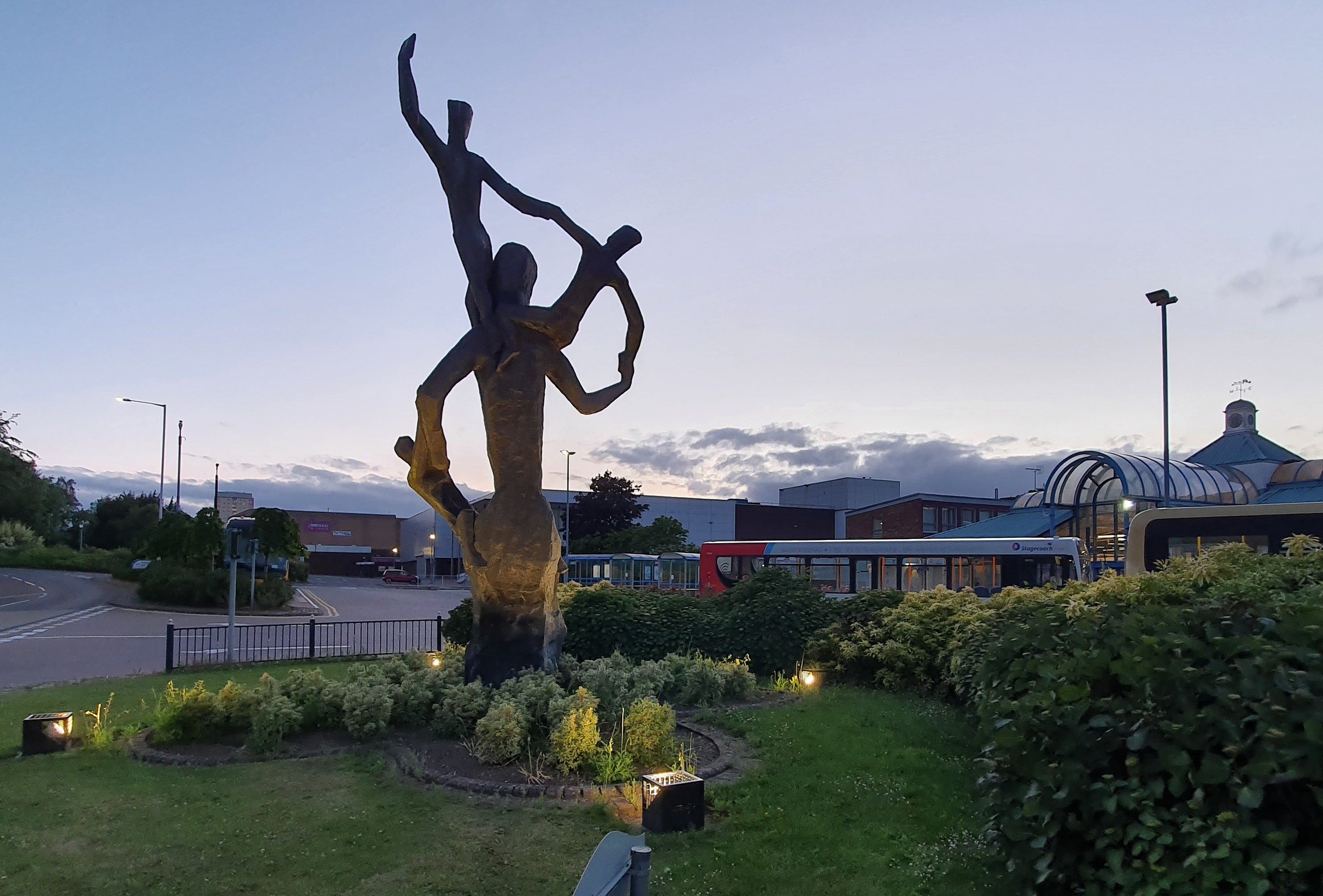
- From top, left to right: View looking west towards Glenrothes from St Drostan's Cemetery, Riverside Park Pond, Rothes Square, 'Giant Irises' sculpture Leslie Roundabout, 'The Hippo' sculpture in town centre, Ex Terra sculpture and bus station.

- Location within Fife
- Area: 8 sq mi (21 km^{2})
- Population: 37,468 (2022)
  - Density: 4,684/sq mi (1,809/km^{2})
- Settlement: 44,760 (2020)
- OS grid reference: NO281015
  - Edinburgh: 32 mi (51 km)
  - London: 444 mi (715 km)
- Council area: Fife
- Lieutenancy area: Fife
- Country: Scotland
- Sovereign state: United Kingdom
- Post town: GLENROTHES
- Postcode district: KY6, KY7
- Dialling code: 01592
- Police: Scotland
- Fire: Scottish
- Ambulance: Scottish
- UK Parliament: Glenrothes and Mid Fife
- Scottish Parliament: Mid Fife and Glenrothes

Glenrothes (/ɡlɛnˈrɒθɪs/ glen-ROTH-iss; Scots: Glenrothes; Scottish Gaelic: Gleann Rathais, pronounced [kʲlən̪ˠˈrˠahɪʃ]) is a town situated in the heart of Fife, in east-central Scotland. It is the administrative capital of Fife, containing the headquarters of both Fife Council and Police Scotland Fife Division and is a major service and employment centre within the area. In the 2022 census, the town had a resident population of 37,468, making it the third-largest settlement in Fife and the 18th most populous locality in Scotland.

The name Glenrothes comes from its historical link with the Earl of Rothes, who owned much of the land on which the new town has been built; Glen (Scots for valley, from the Gaelic gleann) was added to the name to distinguish it from Rothes in Moray and in recognition that the town lies in a river valley. The motto of Glenrothes is Ex terra vis, meaning "Strength from the earth", which dates back to the founding of the town. Planned shortly after World War II as Scotland's second new town, its purpose was to generate economic growth and renewal in central Fife. Initially this was to be done by providing new homes, industries, infrastructure and services needed to support the development of a newly established National Coal Board 'super pit', the Rothes Colliery. The mine closed early in its life and the town's economy thereafter transitioned and diversified, establishing it as an important centre for light industry and playing a significant role in establishing Scotland's Silicon Glen between 1961 and 2000.

Today, Glenrothes is a centre for excellence within the high-tech electronics and manufacturing industry sectors; several organisations have their global headquarters in Glenrothes. Major employers include Bosch Rexroth (hydraulics manufacturing), CTDI UK (Electronic Repair), Fife College (education), Leviton (fibre optics manufacturing) and Raytheon (defence and electronics). Glenrothes is unique in Fife as much of the town centre floorspace is internalised within Fife's largest shopping centre, the Kingdom Shopping Centre.

The town has won multiple horticultural awards in the Beautiful Scotland and Britain in Bloom contests for the quality of its parks and landscaping and features numerous outdoor sculptures and artworks resulting from the appointment of town artists in the early development of the town. Public facilities include a regional sports and leisure centre, two golf courses, major parks, a civic centre and theatre and a college campus. The A92 trunk road provides the principal road access, passing through Glenrothes and connecting it to the wider Scottish motorway and trunk road network. A major bus station is located in the town centre, providing regional and local bus services to surrounding settlements. Glenrothes lies on the edge of the Edinburgh–Dundee line and Fife Circle rail line with railway stations serving the town located at Markinch and Thornton.

== History ==
=== Toponymy ===
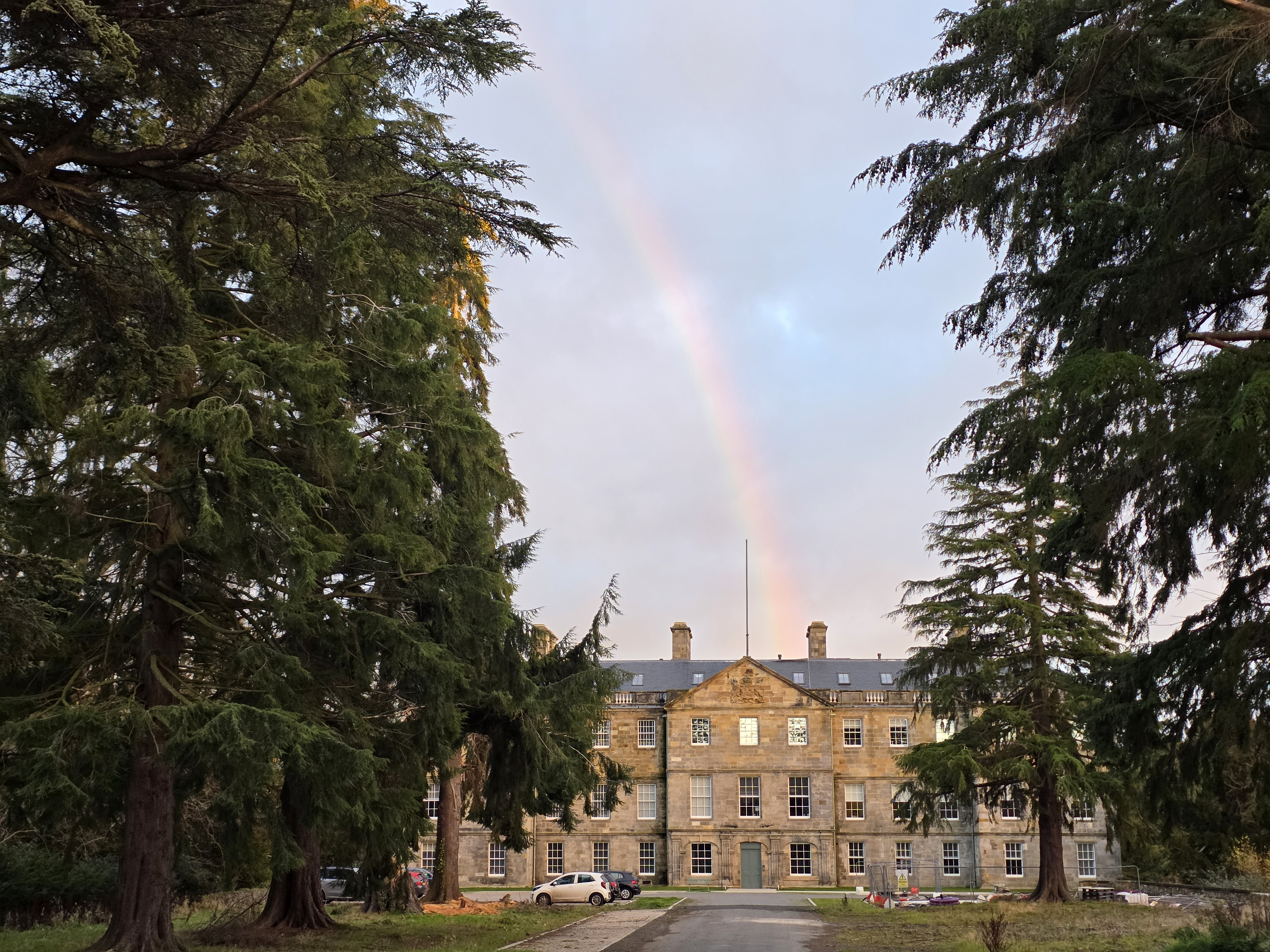
Leslie House, former home of the Earl of Rothes

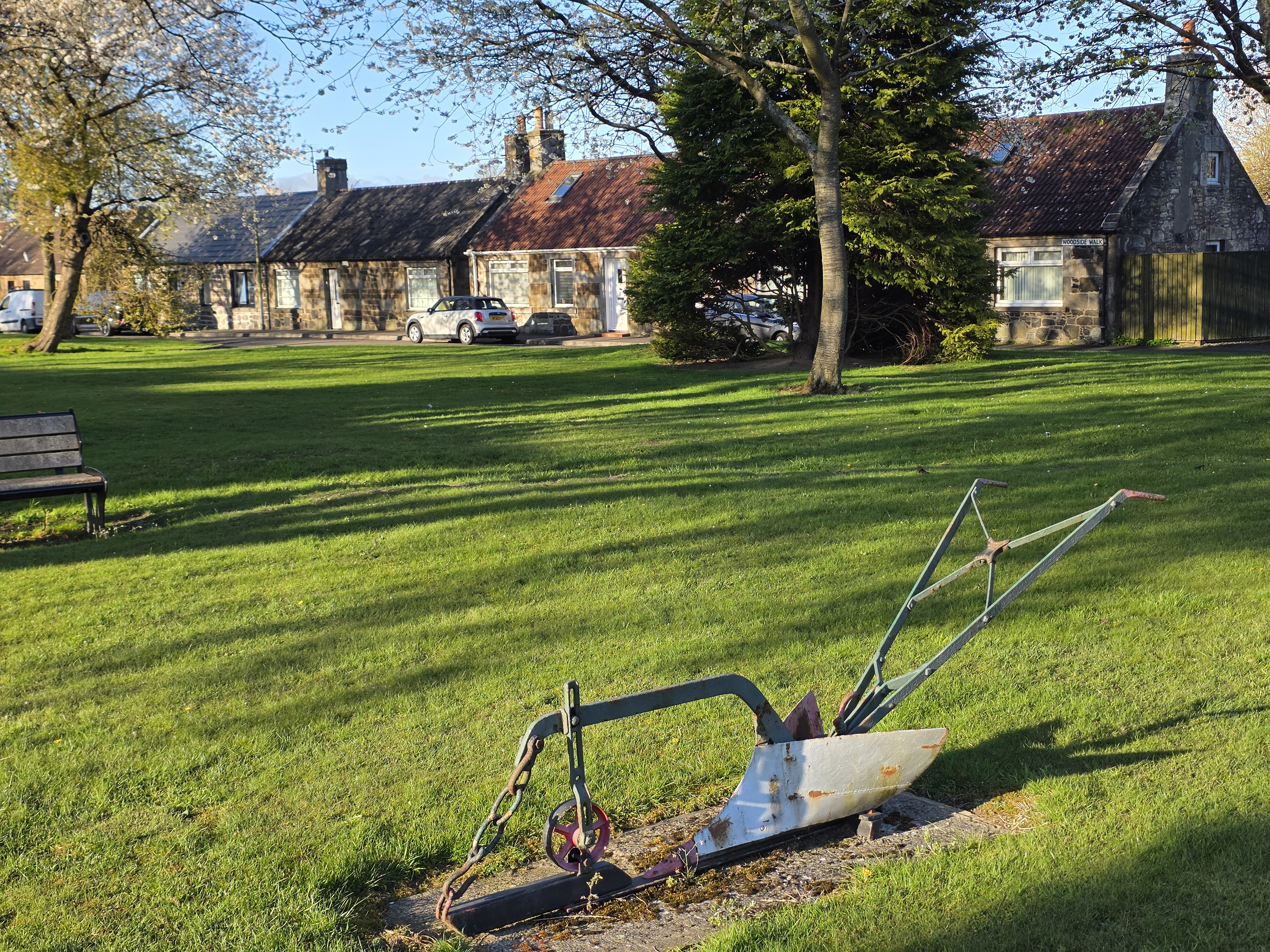
Row of cottages and green at Woodside

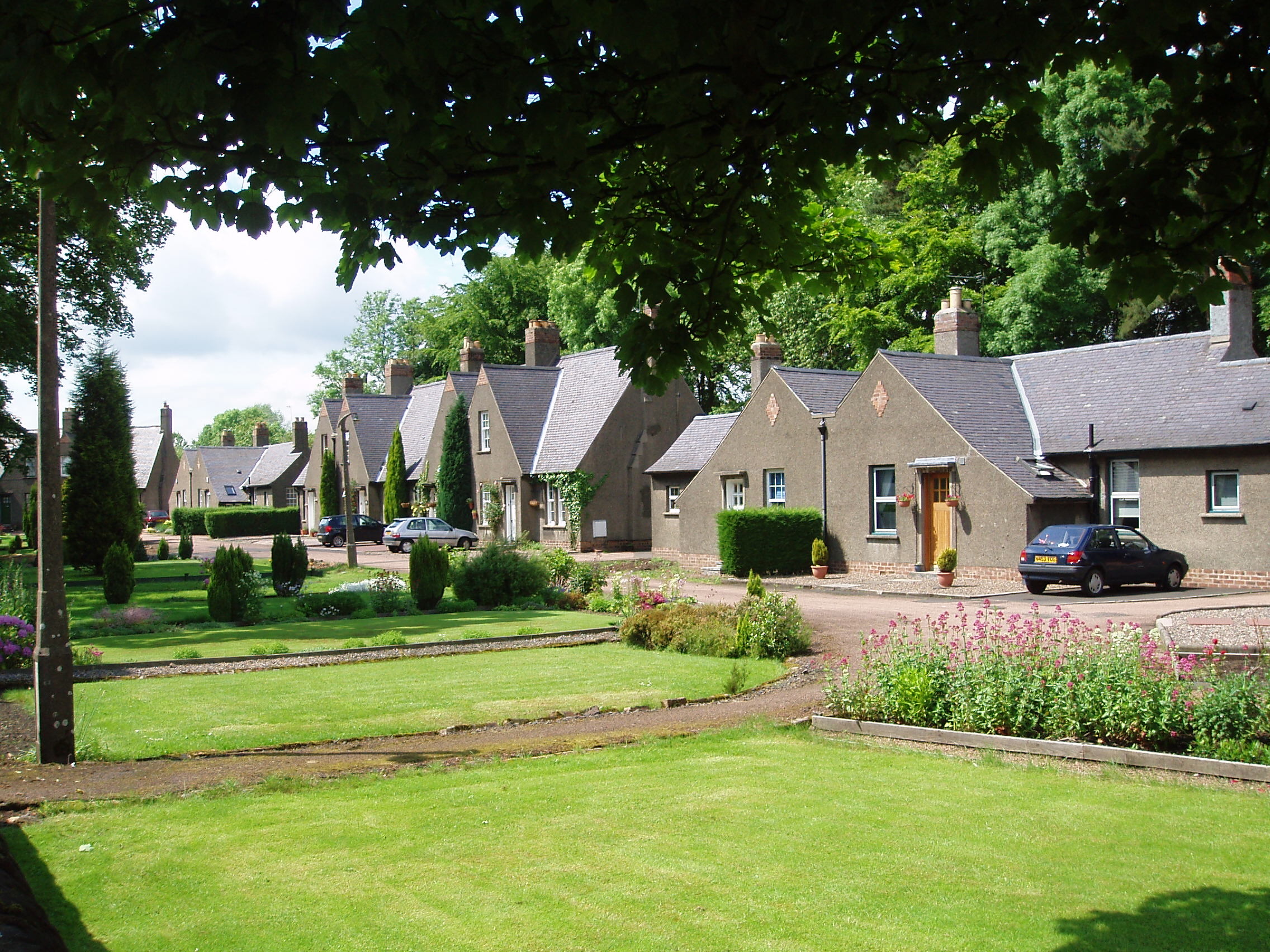
Cadham Village conservation area

South Parks Farmhouse and Steadings

The decision on the town's name was taken by the Fife Planning Committee which met in Cupar on 4 July 1947. Twelve names were considered for the new town prior to its formal designation. From the list of names Glenrothes and Westwood tied with five ballot votes each. Cadham, Drostain, Thaines and Woodside each received a single vote. The name Westwood was proposed by Provost John Drummond, after Joseph Westwood, who was a strong advocate for the delivery of the new town, cut his political teeth in Fife and was Secretary of State for Scotland at the time. Glenrothes carried the day by eight votes to six on a second ballot despite the plea to recognise Westwood's “services to the country”. In a tragic twist of fate Joseph Westwood died 18 days later in a car accident.

The name Rothes comes from the association with the Earl of Rothes, of the Leslie family. This family historically owned much of the land on which Glenrothes has been built, residing in Leslie House and also giving the family name to the adjacent village of Leslie in 1455; the village was previously known as 'Fettykill' or 'Fythkill' (Fiodh Chill in Scottish Gaelic). "Glen" (from the Scottish Gaelic word gleann meaning valley) was added to prevent confusion with Rothes in Moray, and to reflect the location of the town within the River Leven valley.

The different areas ("precincts") of Glenrothes have been named after the hamlets that were already established in the area (e.g. Cadham, Woodside), the farms which formally occupied the land (e.g. Caskieberran, Collydean, Rimbleton, South Parks) or the historical estate homes in the area (e.g. Balbirnie, Balgeddie, Leslie Parks, Pitcairn).

=== Early known settlement ===
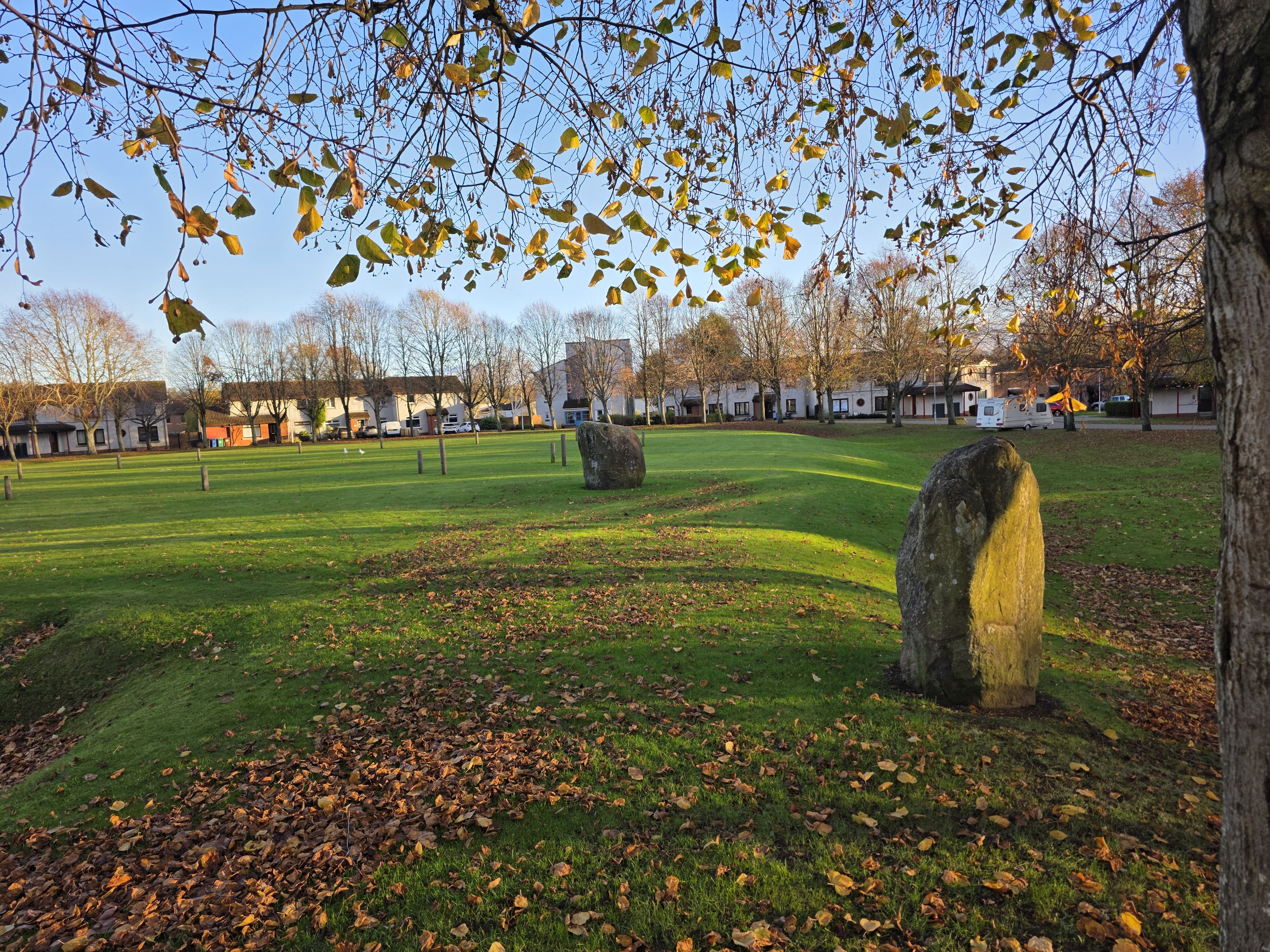
Remains of henge at Balfarg

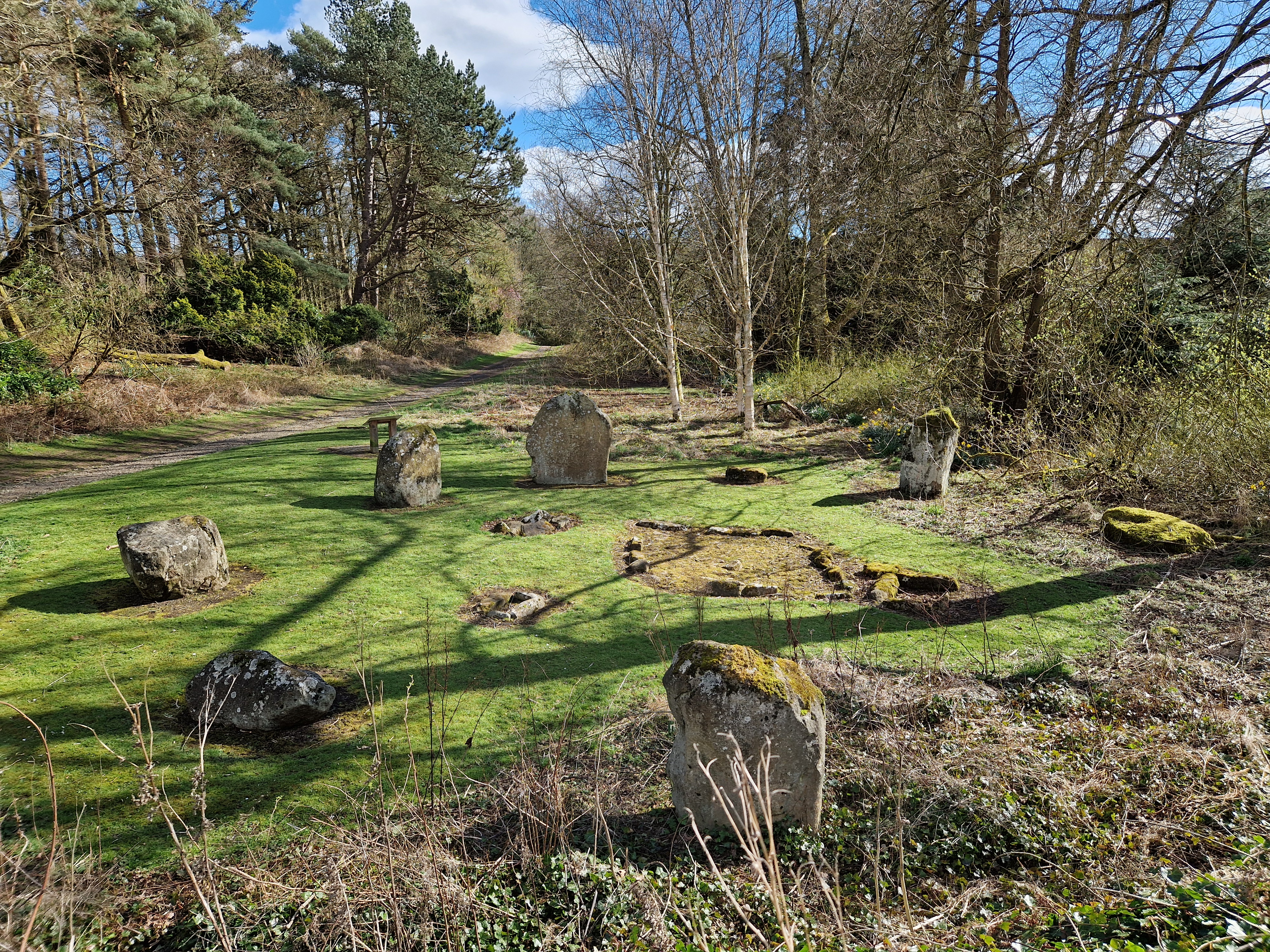
Balbirnie Stone Circle

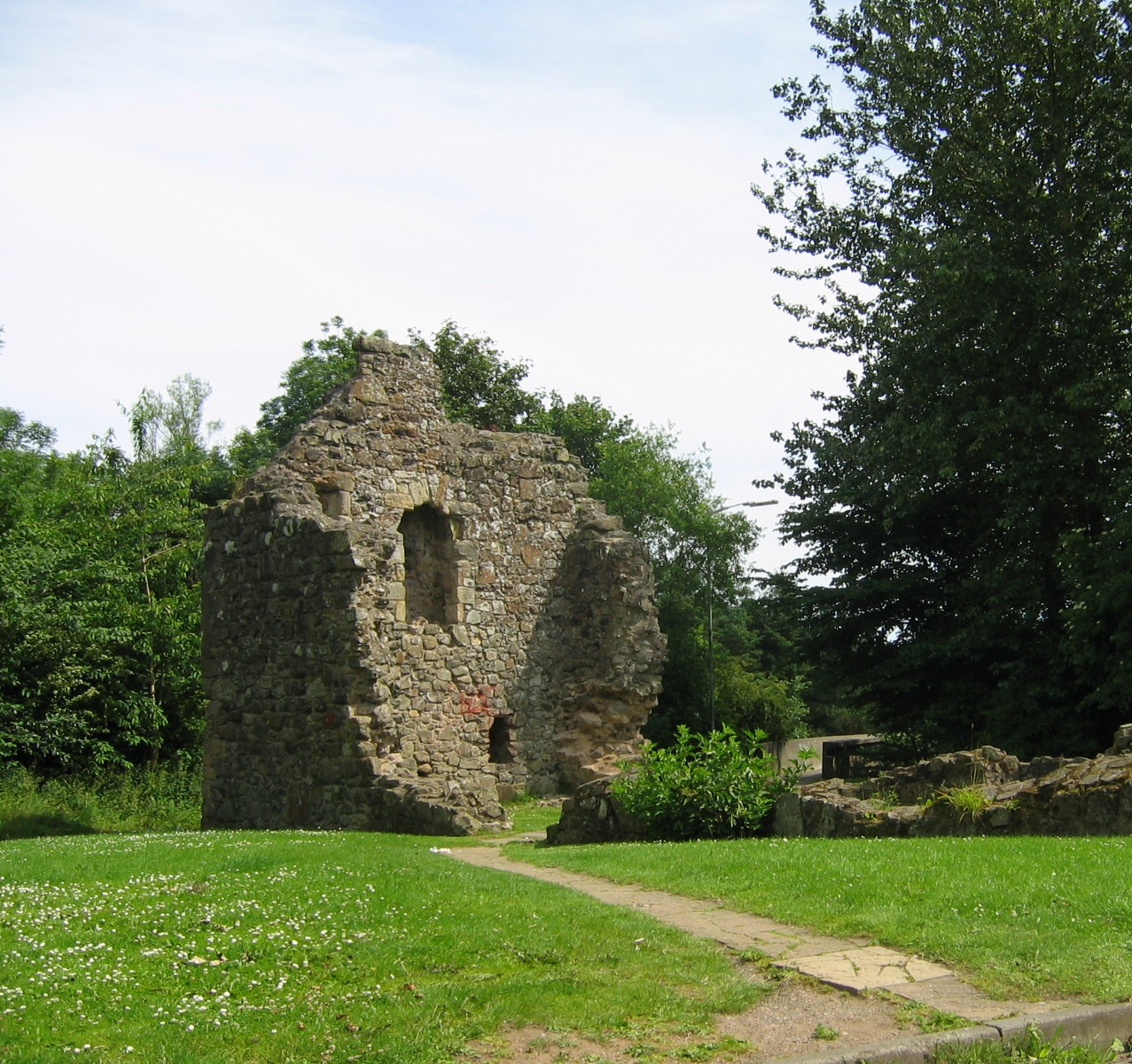
The remains of Pitcairn House

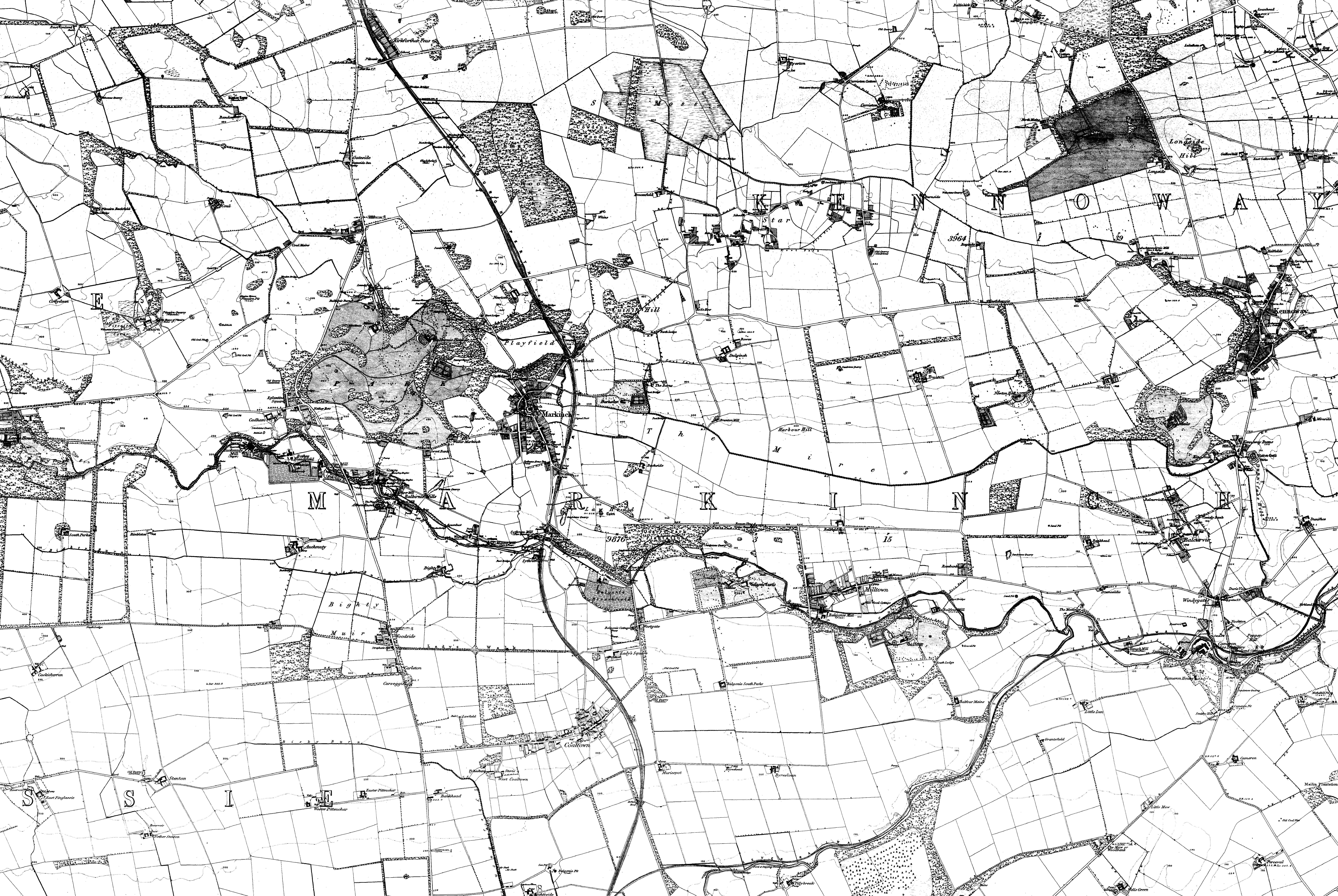
Map (circa 1855 and 1857) of locality before development of Glenrothes

Despite being built out predominantly across the latter half of the 20th Century there was evidence of habitation and activity across the area prior to and up to the development of Glenrothes. The remains of ancient stone circles exist at Balbirnie and Balfarg in the northeast of the town. The Balfarg henge was constructed around 3000 BC and contains the remnants of a stone circle which has been partly reconstructed. The henge was excavated between 1977 and 1978 prior to the development of a new housing estate. The Balbirnie stone circle and cairn, only about 500 m away from Balfarg, was excavated between 1970 and 1971. To allow widening of the A92, the stones were moved a short distance to a new location at North Lodge and reconstructed as nearly as possible in the original way. The stone circle has been carbon dated as being from the Bronze Age. It is thought that the Balbirnie stone circle and the Balfarg circle once formed part of a larger ceremonial complex.

While the Balfarg Henge and Balbirnie Stone Circle are primarily Neolithic and Bronze Age ceremonial sites, archaeological evidence shows they retained significant cultural and ritual value for the Picts during the early medieval period. A Class I Pictish symbol stone, featuring a carved "Pictish Beast" and a crescent and V-rod motif, was discovered near the Balfarg complex. Archaeologists associate this local Pictish presence with the major contemporary power centre located just north of Glenrothes' town boundary at the East Lomond Hill. Recent excavations by the University of Aberdeen have confirmed a bustling late Roman Iron Age and Pictish settlement (c. 3rd–7th centuries AD) on East Lomond Hill, indicating that the ancient ritual monuments within Glenrothes sat directly within the economic and cultural orbit of the elite Pictish warrior class which ruled at the time.

There are a number of historical country houses in Glenrothes. Balbirnie House, a category-A listed Georgian period building, was bought along with its grounds in 1969 by the Glenrothes Development Corporation (GDC) from the Balfour family to be developed as Balbirnie Country Park and Golf Course. The house was later occupied and restored by the GDC in 1981, to stop the property falling into disrepair. This led to private investor interest, and the house was converted into a four-star hotel in 1989. The B-listed former stable block of the house was converted into a craft centre. Balgeddie House, a C-Listed former residence of Sir Robert Spencer Nairn located in the northwest of the town and built in the 1930s, has also been converted into a hotel. Leslie House, the category-A listed 17th century former home of the Earl of Rothes (Clan Leslie), became a care home for the elderly in 1945; owned by the Church of Scotland. The building was in the process of being renovated, when the interior and roof of the house were destroyed by a fire in February 2009. However, the mansion was restored by late 2024, sub-divided into flats and since re-occupied. Much of the former grounds of Leslie House have been used to create Riverside Park. Collydean precinct hosts a ruin of a 17th-century house called Pitcairn House which was built for and first occupied by Archibald Pitcairne, a famous Scottish physician.

The land which Glenrothes now occupies was largely agricultural, and once contained a number of small rural communities and the hamlets of Cadham, Carlton and Woodside. Cadham Village (formally known as Coalhill) was originally a colliery village where mining was carried out from before 1730 until the late 1800s. Tullis Russell Ltd further developed and expanded the settlement around the 1920s to house workers at its nearby paper mills. It was designated a Conservation Area in 1985. The area now known as Woodside was at one time two small settlements, Woodside and Carleton. Woodside developed north of the Woodside Inn, a coaching inn that established along the Kirkcaldy to Cupar (A92) road. Carlton was south of the Woodside Inn concentrated around Well Road and the Mustard Seed Hall. In 1841 Woodside was recorded as having 29 houses and 135 inhabitants and doubled in size during the Victorian period with further expansion in the 1920s.

=== Glenrothes new town ===
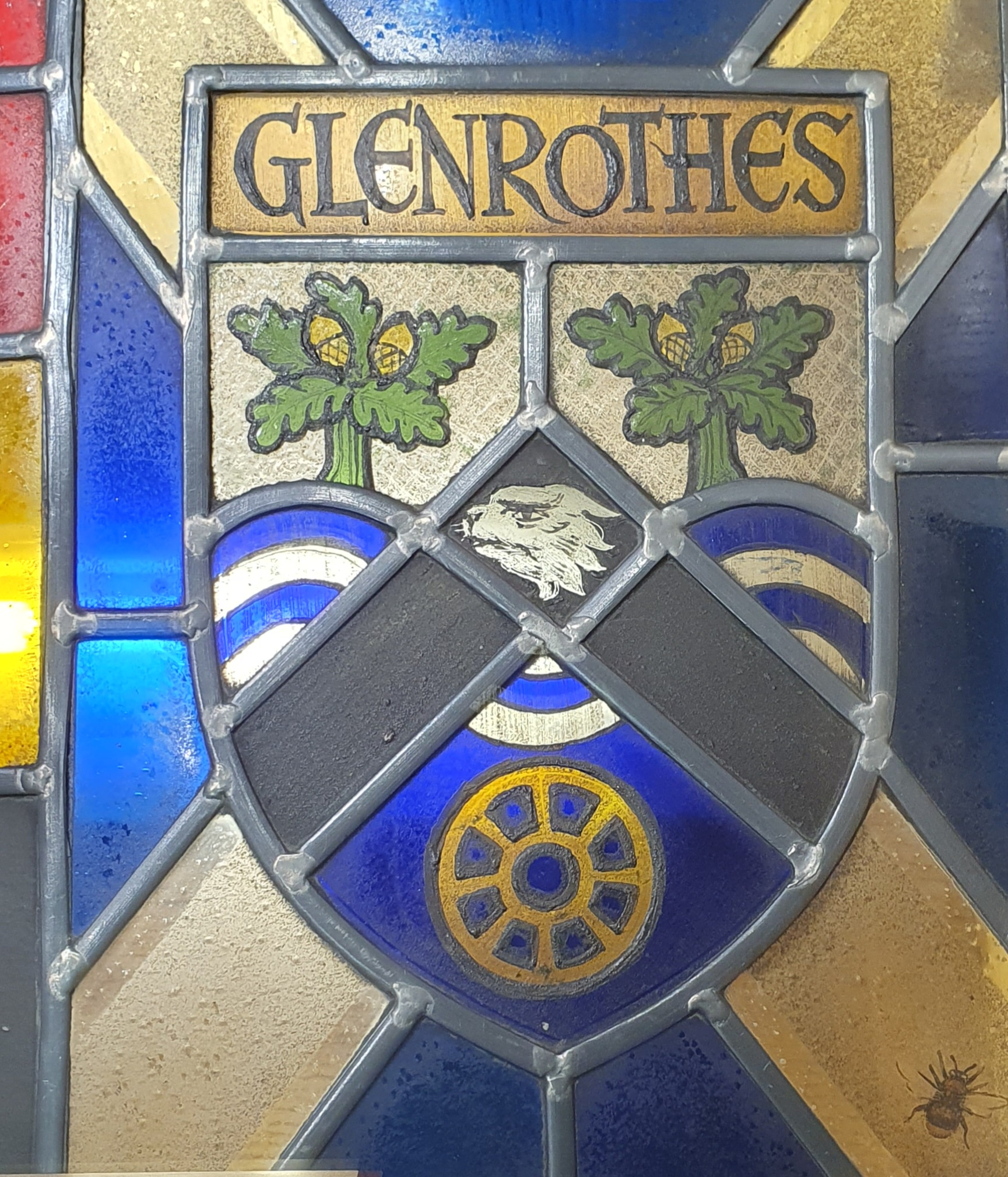
Glenrothes Development Corporation Coat of Arms

Glenrothes was designated in 1948 under the New Towns Act 1946 as Scotland's second post-war new town. The planning, development, management and promotion of the new town were the responsibility of the Glenrothes Development Corporation (GDC), a quango appointed by the Secretary of State for Scotland. The corporation board consisted of eight members including a chairman and deputy chairman. The first meeting of the GDC was in Auchmuty House, provided by Tullis Russell on 20 June 1949.

The original plan was to build a new settlement for a population of 32,000 to 35,000. The initial preferred option for the new town would have centred it on Markinch, building around the original settlement and utilising the existing services and infrastructure, including the rail station there. However, the historic village's infrastructure was deemed unable to withstand the substantial growth that would be needed for a new town of the scale proposed, and there was considerable local opposition to the plans. Leslie and Thornton were also considered as possible locations, again meeting local opposition, and eventually the area between all of these villages, amounting to 5,320 acres (2,153 ha), was zoned for the new town's development. Much of the historical Aytoun, Balfour, Balgonie and Rothes estates were included in Glenrothes' assigned area, along with the historical country houses and estates of Balbirnie House, Balgeddie House and Leslie House.

Unlike the other post-war Scottish new towns, Cumbernauld, East Kilbride, Irvine and Livingston, Glenrothes was not originally to be a Glasgow overspill new town, although it did later take this role. However a sizeable proportion of the population in the early 1950s was made up by families moving from the declining coalfield areas of Scotland who were looking for work and an improved quality of life. It is also the only Scottish new town not to take its name from an existing settlement; in that respect it was a completely new settlement.

The GDC was wound up in 1995 after which responsibility for Glenrothes was largely transferred to Fife Council with assets such as the Kingdom Shopping Centre, industrial and office units sold off to private sector companies. However, by 1995 the GDC had left a lasting legacy on the town by overseeing the development of over 15,000 houses, 5,174,125 square feet (480,692 m^{2}) of industrial floorspace, 735,476 square feet (68,328 m^{2}) of office floorspace and 576,977 square feet (53,603 m^{2}) of shopping floorspace. Since the winding up of the GDC Glenrothes continues to serve as Fife's principal administrative centre and serves a wider sub-regional area as a major centre for services and employment.

=== Industrial history ===
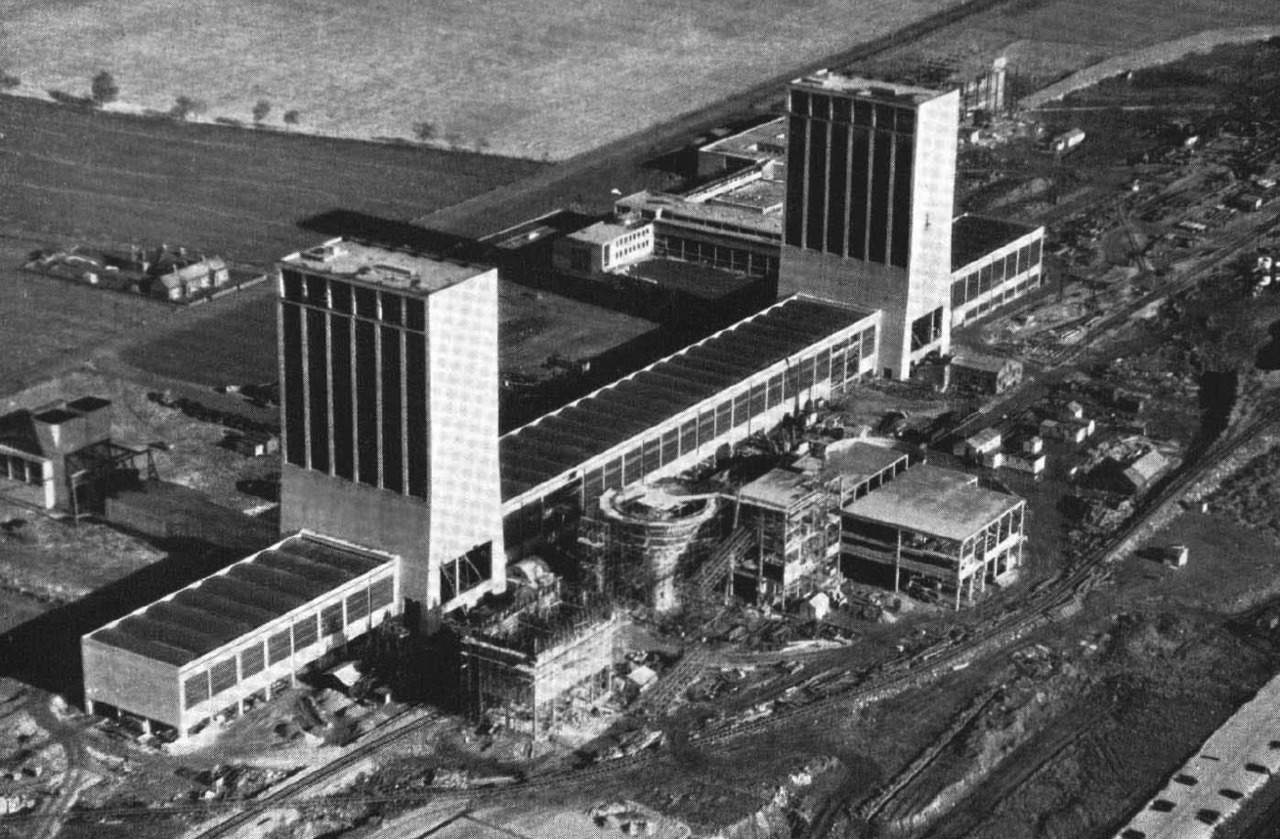
Rothes Colliery, circa 1957

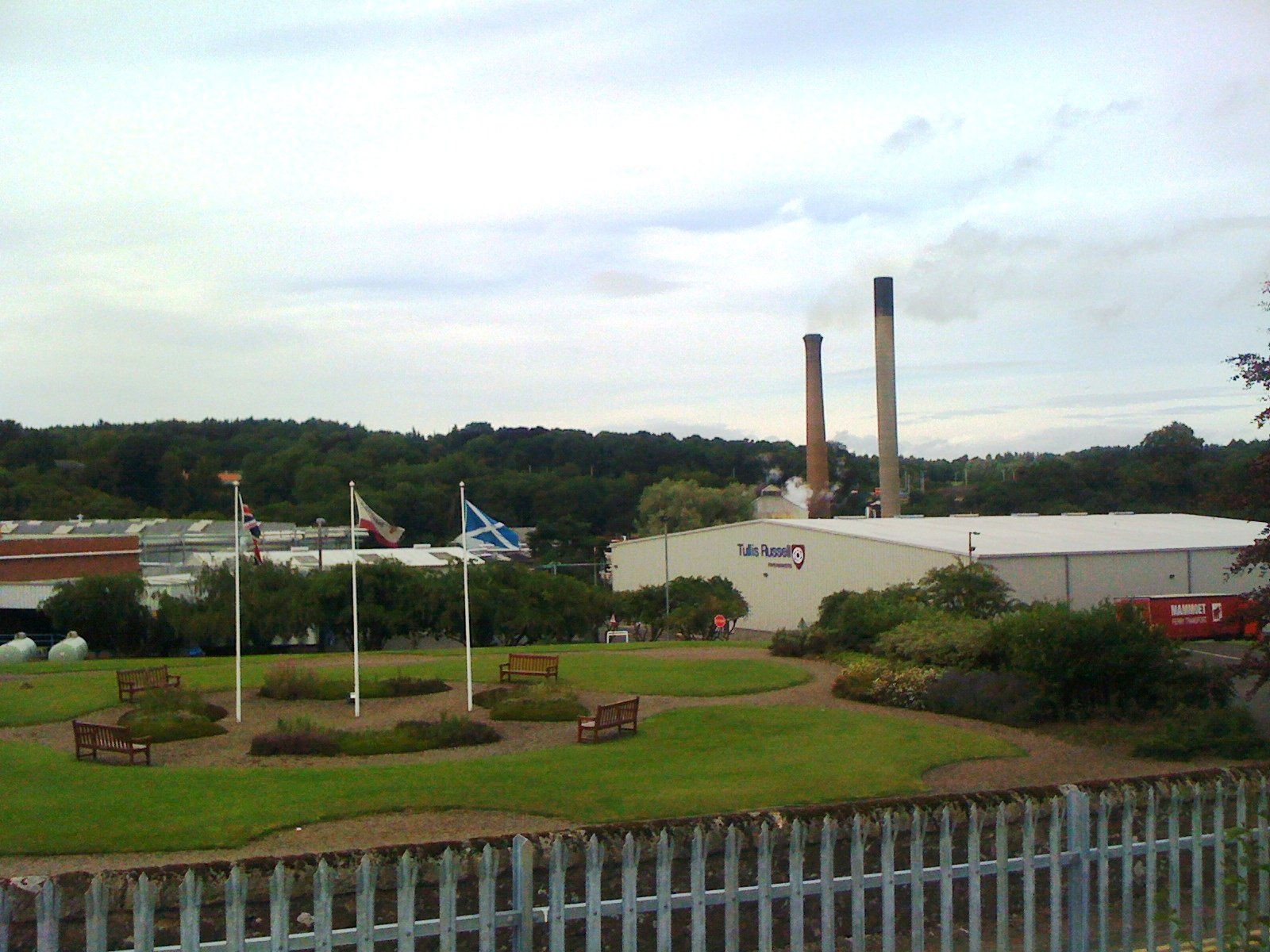
Tullis Russell Papermills in 2010

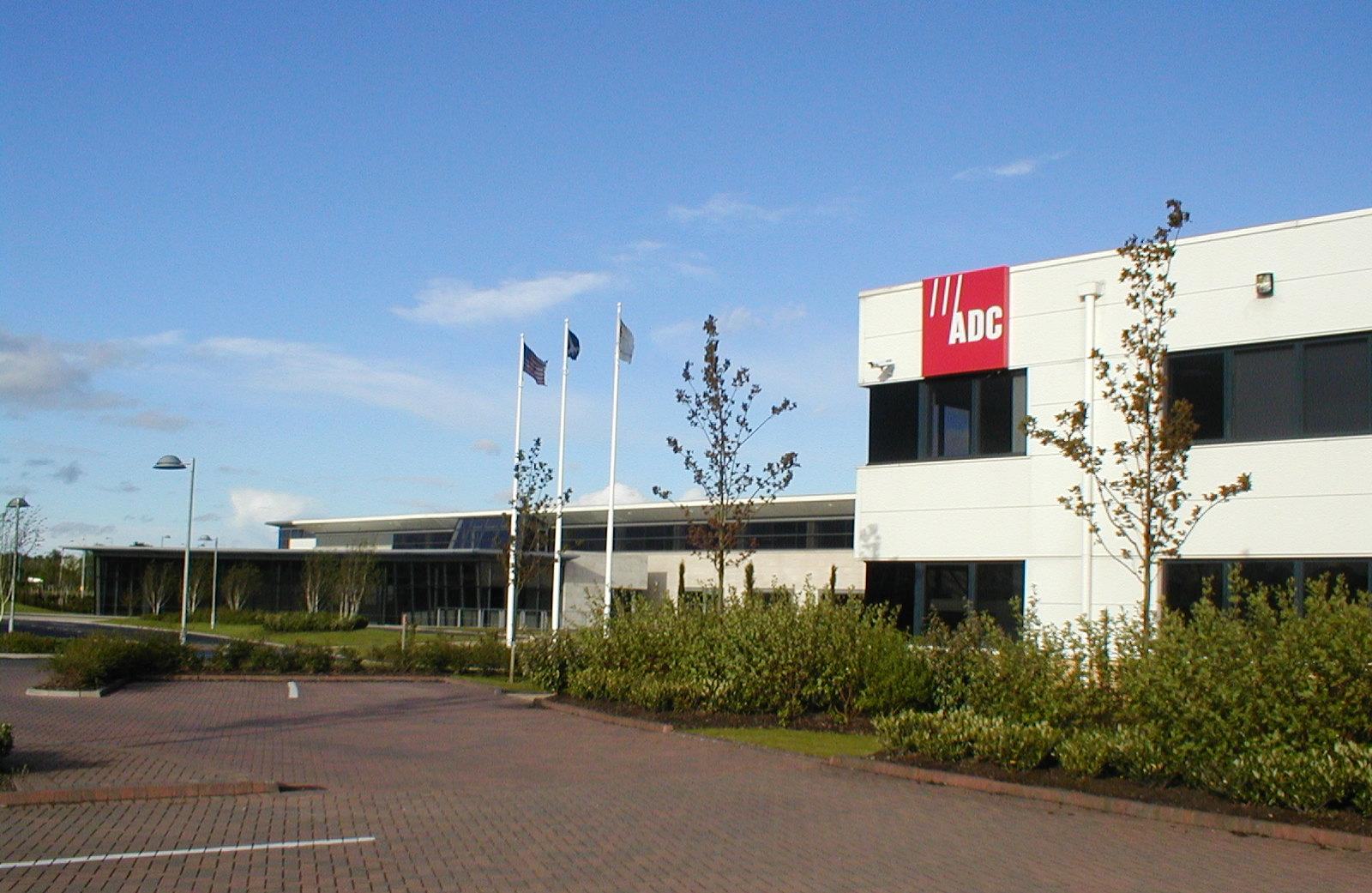
ADC electronics plant in 2005

Before Glenrothes was developed, the main industries in the area were papermaking, coal mining and farming. Local paper manufacturers included the Auchmuty and Rothes Mills (latterly Tullis Russell) and Balbirnie Mills (later Sappi Graphics) near Markinch in the east and the Fettykil (now the Sapphire Paper Mill) and Prinlaws Mills to the west at Leslie. The paper mills were established along the banks of the River Leven which powered their operations.

Scotland had emerged from the Second World War in a strong position both to contribute to the UK's post-war reconstruction, and to help repay heavy overseas debt incurred in rearmament and six years of war. At the heart of government strategy was the need to produce energy, and the first focus of the resulting industrial renewal was massive investment by the state in the Scottish coal industry. The case for developing Glenrothes was partially driven by this strategy, and was further advanced in the Regional Plan for Central and South-East Scotland prepared in 1946 by Sir Frank Mears. This specifically made the case for a new town in the Leslie-Markinch area to support growth in the coal mining industry in Fife.

The Rothes Colliery, the new coal mine associated with the town's development, was built on land to the west of Thornton, an established village south of Glenrothes. The mine, which was formally opened by Queen Elizabeth II in 1957, was promoted as a key driver in the economic regeneration of central Fife. However, unstemmable flooding and geological problems in the area, combined with a lessening demand for coal nationally, made the mine less viable, and it was closed in 1965. Ironically, miners who had worked in older deep pits in the area had warned against the development of the Rothes pit for this very reason.

On 28 May 1963 Cadco Development Ltd held a press conference in Edinburgh to announce that they were bringing 2,000 jobs to Glenrothes. They were going to take three factories on the Queensway Industrial Estate; open pig breeding units at Whitehill; and build a supermarket in the town centre. Cadco's board of directors included the film star George Sanders and his wife Benita Hume alongside Denis Loraine and Tom Roe (Thomas Chambers Windsor Roe). Loraine soon persuaded the Glenrothes Development Corporation that the construction work should be carried out by Cadco's own building company, which had opened a depot in nearby Kirkcaldy. By May 1964 Cadco were confident that their factories would soon start production, but by October all work had stopped because the Cadco Building Company had not paid its sub-contractors and suppliers. It transpired that Cadco did not have the money to back up its plans; and the banks and small companies who had respectively paid for and done the advance work found themselves out of pocket; and its employees lost their jobs. It turned out that the money the development corporation had paid to Cadco for building work had been used instead to help the failing Royal Victoria Sausages Company in Brighton. When the scam was exposed, the town's MP Willie Hamilton posed questions in the House of Commons and a Board of Trade inquiry was set up. As the hoped-for jobs evaporated, the development corporation, the Royal Bank of Scotland and others involved had to explain to the Board of Trade inspectors how they been taken in by Denis Loraine and Cadco. However, no-one was ever prosecuted for their part in the affair in the United Kingdom. Historians speculate that this was because of the involvement, direct and indirect, of people in high places, particularly future Prime Minister, Edward Heath and Hollywood actress Jayne Mansfield. Investors alleged to be compromised by the scandal ranged from novelist Graham Greene to Charlie Chaplin. After the scandal broke, Loraine fled to the United States, only avoiding a long prison sentence by working under cover to help bring to justice those behind the biggest counterfeiting operation in US history.

The closure of the Rothes Colliery almost halted the further development of Glenrothes resulting in a battle to secure a future for the new town. Soon afterwards, however, central government modified the town's role by appointing it as an economic focal point for economic growth and development, one of several across Central Scotland to be developed as part of a Regional Plan. The Glenrothes Development Corporation were able to use this status to attract a plethora of light industries and modern electronics factories to the town. They had already had success in attracting big overseas electronic investors, the first of which was Beckmans Instruments in 1959, followed by Hughes Industries in the early 1960s. A number of other important companies followed, including Apricot Computers, Brand Rex, Burroughs Machines Ltd, Elliott Automation and General Instrument establishing Glenrothes as a major industrial hub in Scotland's Silicon Glen.

Major industrial estates were developed to the south of Glenrothes, largely because it was near the proposed East Fife Regional Road (A92) which was developed in 1989, giving dual carriageway access to the main central Scotland road network. The rapid growth experienced in Silicon Glen peaked in the 1990s with Canon developing their first UK manufacturing plant at Westwood Park in Glenrothes in 1992. ADC Telecommunications, a major American electronics company, established a base at Bankhead in early 2000 with the promise of a substantial number of jobs. Around the start of the 21st century, a decline in major electronics manufacturing in Scotland affected the town's economy, and thus the industrial base of the town was forced to diversify for the second time in its short history. By 2004 both ADC and Canon had closed their Glenrothes operations, with much of the promised jobs growth failing to materialise. This was largely due to the electronics industrial sector in Glenrothes and most of central Scotland being dependent upon an inward investment strategy that led to almost 43% of employment in foreign-owned plants which were susceptible to changes in global economic markets.

=== Modern history ===
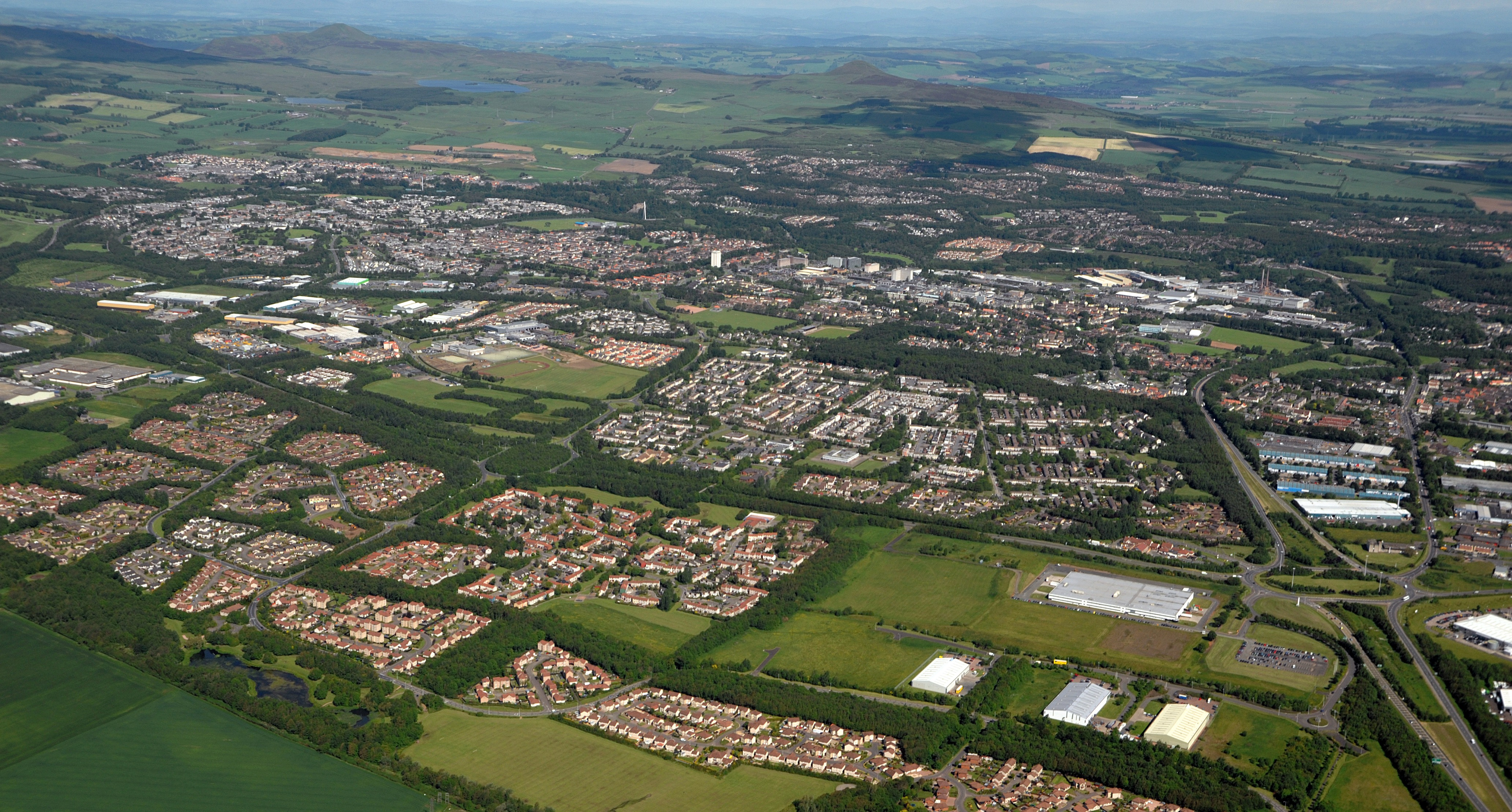
Aerial view of Glenrothes in 2011 taken from southeast

In 2008, coinciding with the town's 60th anniversary, Canadian artist and researcher Sylvia Grace Borda chose to explore the town as if she were a late-1960s photographer of common places. The outcome was the production of a series of images which the artist believes contradict how some Scots would 'see' Glenrothes.

Annual awards that were set up by Urban Realm and Carnyx Group in the mid-2000s to challenge the quality of built environments in Scotland saw Glenrothes awarded their Carbuncle Award in 2009. The judges awarded Glenrothes the category of the most dismal place in Scotland for its "depressed and investment starved town centre". This generated mixed and polarized views from locals and built environment professionals alike. Paradoxically in 2010 the town won awards for being the "Best Kept Large Town" and the most "Clean, sustainable and beautiful community" in Scotland in the Beautiful Scotland competition and was the winner in the "large town" category in the 2011 Royal Horticultural Society Britain in Bloom competition. The town achieved further Gold awards in the 2013 and 2014 UK finals.

In 2011 then Historic Scotland completed an assessment of the town art in Glenrothes, ultimately awarding listed status to a number of artworks scattered throughout the town. The organisation also gave positive recognition to Glenrothes' significant role in helping to create the idea of art being a key factor in creating a sense of place.

Glenrothes' place and importance in the history and development of Scotland has been enshrined in the Great Tapestry of Scotland, which was unveiled in 2013 in the Scottish Parliament. The Glenrothes panel shows various pieces of the town's public artworks, along with visual references to its important industrial heritage associated originally with coal mining and later as a major centre for "Silicon Glen" industries.

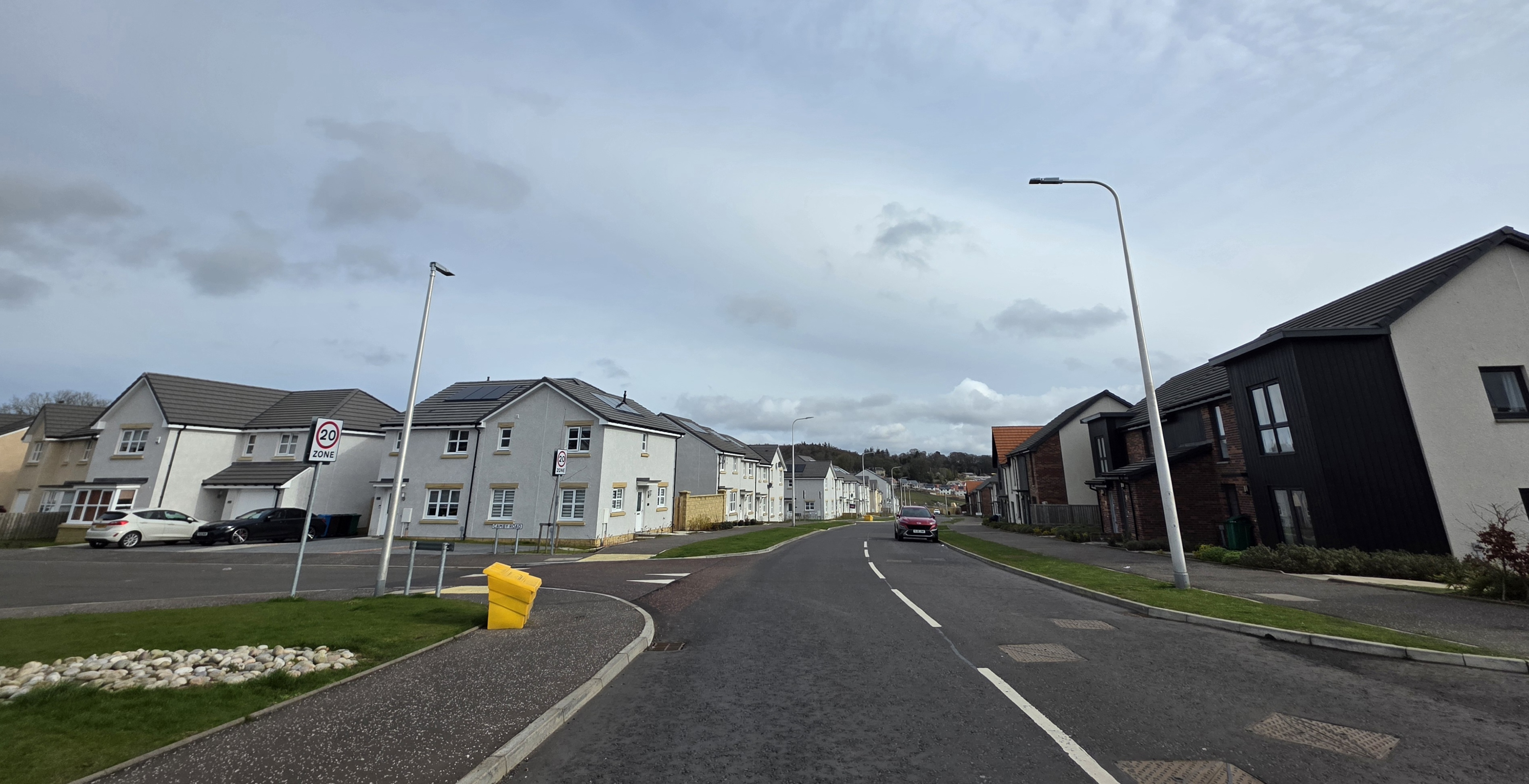
Major housing redevelopment of the former Tullis Russell papermill site (2025)

In mid-2015 Tullis Russell Papermakers, a stalwart to the local area economy for around 200 years, went into administration. The Scottish Government and Fife Council established a taskforce to help mitigate the effects of job losses and put in place appropriate support for a sustainable future for the area. Around £6 million was set aside to support the Fife Taskforce's Action Plan which included projects such as the Queensway Technology Park; supporting the regeneration of Queensway Industrial Estate to develop a modern business and technology park which can utilise the proximity to RWE's Biomass Power Generation facility and to a Green Data Centre. The Glenrothes Enterprise Hub was another project delivered as a result of the task force support. Redevelopment on the site of the former mills for mixed uses including around 800 new homes, retail, businesses and industry commenced in early 2022.

The Glenrothes Energy Network was progressed in 2017 to utilise the heat from the RWE Markinch Biomass CHP plant which opened in March 2015. The project was a collaboration between Fife Council, RWE and the Scottish Government. It was awarded Scottish Government funding in May 2017 as part of the Scottish Energy Strategy. Construction of the heat network commenced in June 2018 and the network became operational in April 2019 making it Scotland's first 100% renewable biomass heat and power district network. The network was officially opened by the Scottish Minister for Energy, Connectivity and the Islands, Paul Wheelhouse. In 2019 the project won the Cities & Communities award at the Decentralized Energy Awards organised by the Association for Decentralised Energy. It supplies low carbon heat to Council offices, local businesses and homes in Glenrothes.

== Governance ==
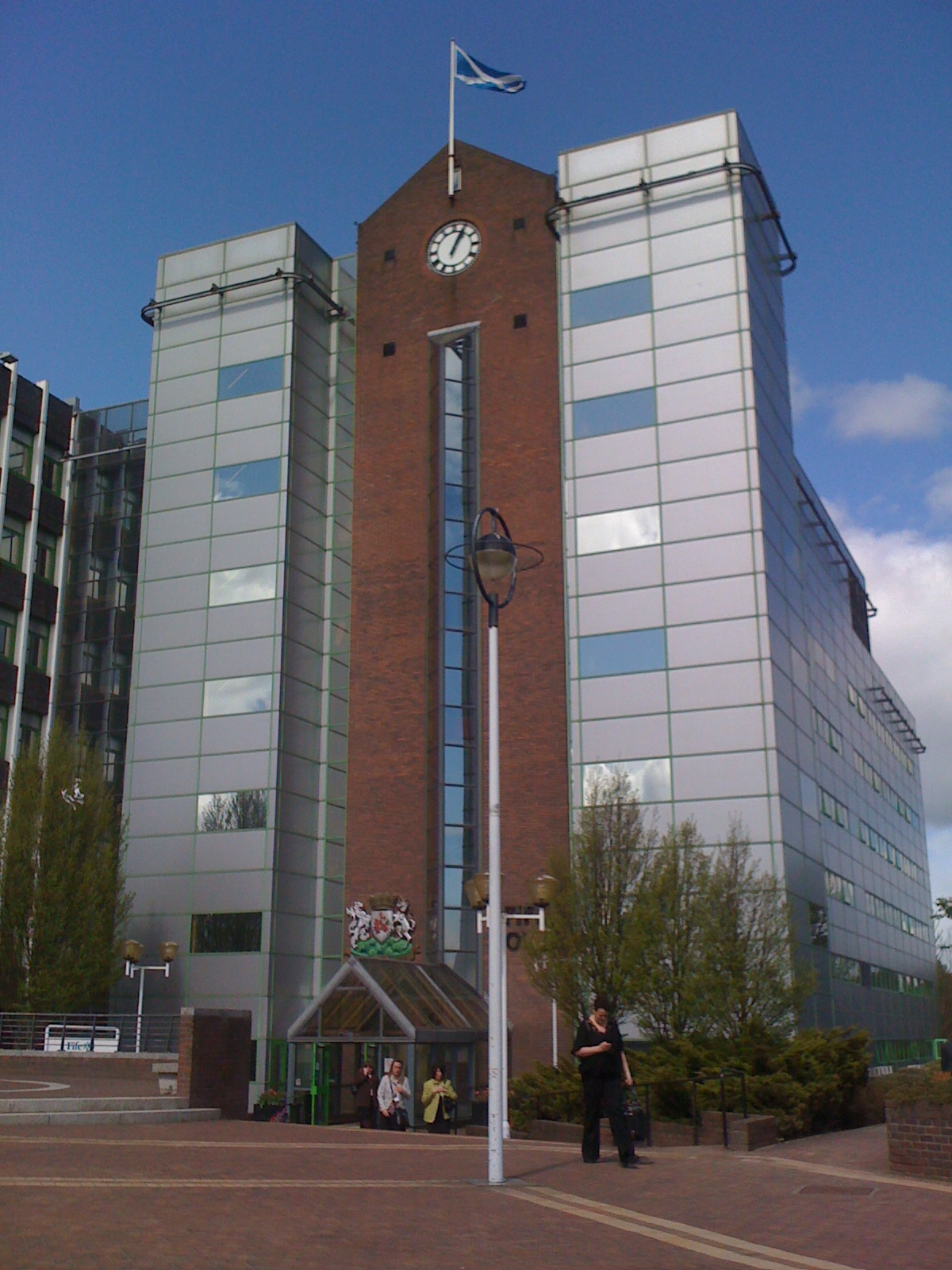
Fife House, headquarters of Fife Council

In the early years of the creation of the new town the Glenrothes Development Corporation (GDC) with input from the local authority, then Fife County Council, and later Kirkcaldy District Council and Fife Regional Council, oversaw the governance. There was some controversy in this arrangement in that Glenrothes was the only new town designated in the UK without the power to agree to any planning applications that fell within its boundary with such decisions taken by either Kirkcaldy District or Fife Regional Councils. In the mid-1970s, the town replaced Cupar as the HQ of Fife Regional Council, making it the administrative centre of Fife. There were also proposals to formally establish a Glenrothes District Council but this was overtaken by proposals for broader local government reorganisation that took place in the 1990s. Also in the early 1990s the then Conservative UK Government established a wind-up order for all of the UK's new town development corporations. Responsibilities for the assets, management and governance of all of the new towns were to be transferred to either private sector companies, or to the local authorities or other government organisations.

Glenrothes is represented by a number of tiers of elected government. North Glenrothes Community Council and Pitteuchar, Stenton and Finglassie Community Council form the lowest tier of governance whose statutory role is to communicate local opinion to local and central government.

Fife Council is the executive, deliberative and legislative body responsible for local governance in the region and has its main headquarters in Glenrothes. Council meetings take place in Fife House (formerly known as Glenrothes House) in the town centre. The west wing of the building was built by the Glenrothes Development Corporation (GDC) as their offices in 1969, which was later used as the headquarters of Fife Regional Council. Glenrothes is divided by 3 of the 22 Fife Council electoral wards, Glenrothes Central and Thornton (ward), Glenrothes North, Leslie and Markinch (ward) and Glenrothes West and Kinglassie (ward).

For the purposes of the Scottish Parliament, Glenrothes forms part of the Mid Fife and Glenrothes constituency following the 2011 Scottish elections. This constituency replaced the former Central Fife constituency. Each constituency elects one Member of the Scottish Parliament (MSP) by the first past the post system of election, and the region elects seven additional members to produce a form of proportional representation. The constituency is represented by Jenny Gilruth MSP of the Scottish National Party who has been elected in the 2016, 2021 and 2026 Scottish Elections. Following the 2026 election she was appointed the role of Deputy First Minister for Scotland and Cabinet Minster for Finance and Local Government.

The town forms part of the county constituency of Glenrothes and Mid-Fife, electing one Member of Parliament (MP) to the House of Commons of the Parliament of the United Kingdom by the first past the post system. Richard Baker of the Labour Party is the MP for Glenrothes after being elected in the 2024 general election. He replaced Peter Grant of the Scottish National Party who was the MP for Glenrothes after being elected in the 2015 general election and the snap election in 2017.

== Geography ==
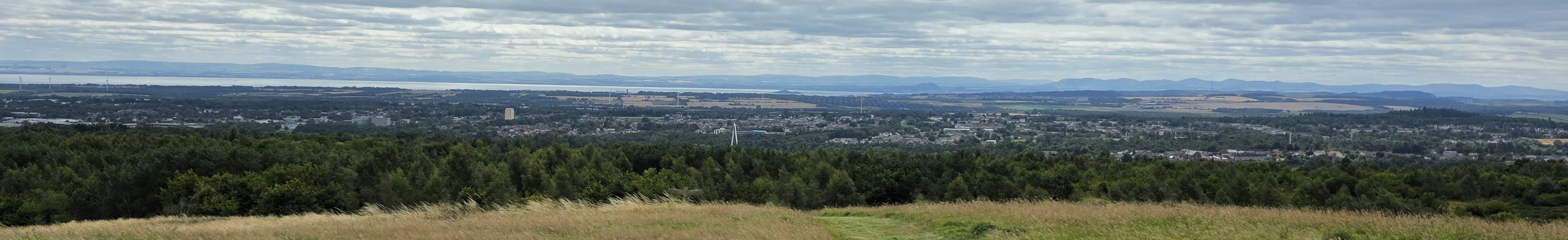
View of Glenrothes from Lomond Hills Regional Park

Glenrothes lies inland and is located in mid-Fife between the agricultural Howe of Fife in the north and east and Fife's industrial heartland in the south and west. Its immediate neighbouring settlements are Coaltown of Balgonie, Leslie, Markinch and Thornton, whose boundaries are virtually indistinguishable from Glenrothes' forming a contiguous urban area. The villages of Kinglassie, Milton of Balgonie and Star are located slightly further away and are physically separated from Glenrothes by farmland, but are considered part of the Glenrothes Locality or Area.

The port and traditional industrial settlements at Kirkcaldy and Levenmouth are located approximately 6 miles (10 km) to the south and east on the coast of the Firth of Forth. Glenrothes is also located equidistant from two of Fife's historically important principal settlements, Dunfermline and St Andrews, at 19 and 21 miles (31 and 34 km) away. Two of Scotland's major cities, Edinburgh and Dundee, are located almost equidistantly from Glenrothes at 32 and 27 miles (51 and 43 km) away, respectively. The smaller Scottish city of Perth is located 23 miles (37 km) to the northwest.

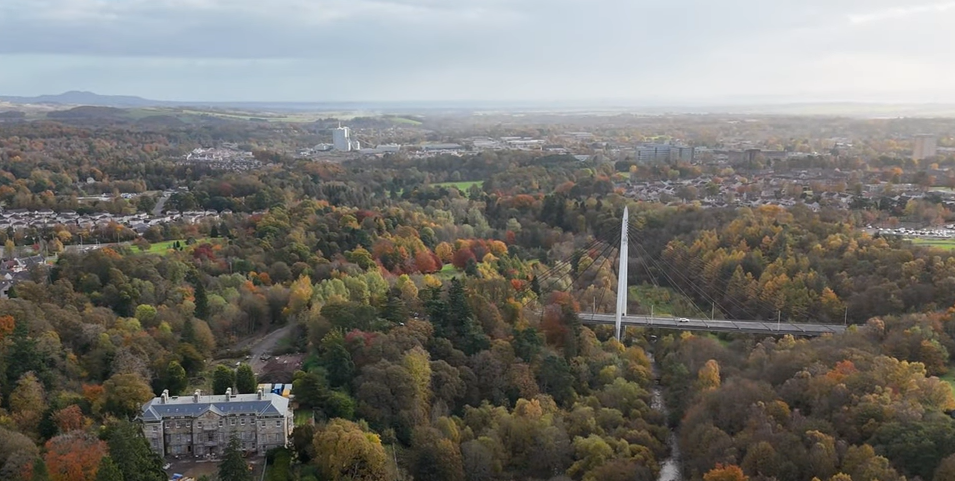
Aerial view over Riverside Park which naturally separates the northern and southern parts of Glenrothes

The northern parts of the settlement lie upland on the southern fringes of the Lomond Hills Regional Park. The central parts of the town extend between the Warout Ridge and the southern edge of the River Leven valley; a substantial green space which passes east west through the town. Southern parts of Glenrothes are largely industrial and are situated on land which gently slopes south towards the Lochty Burn and the village of Thornton. The height above mean sea level at the town centre is 300 feet (91 m). Temperatures in Glenrothes, like the rest of Scotland, are relatively moderate given its northern latitude. Fife is a peninsula, located between the Firth of Tay in the north, the Firth of Forth in the south and the North Sea in the east. Summers are relatively cool and the warming of the water over the summer results in warm winters. Average annual temperatures in Glenrothes range from a maximum of 18 °C (64 °F) to a minimum of 9 °C (48 °F).

A linked network of semi-natural landscape areas throughout the town allow for a mix of biodiversity with different flora and fauna and wildlife habitats. Areas of ancient woodland are found in Riverside Park and Balbirnie Park, both of which are also designated historic gardens and designed landscapes. Balbirnie Park is renowned for having a large collection of rhododendron species. Protected wildlife species found in the Glenrothes area include red squirrels, water voles and various types of bats. Landscape areas also act as natural drainage systems, reducing the likelihood of flooding in the built up areas of the town, with rainwater flows channelled to the River Leven, or to the Lochty Burn. Landscape planning has also ensured that Glenrothes' road network, with particular focuses on the town's many roundabouts, provides green networks throughout the town.

=== Built environment and urban form ===
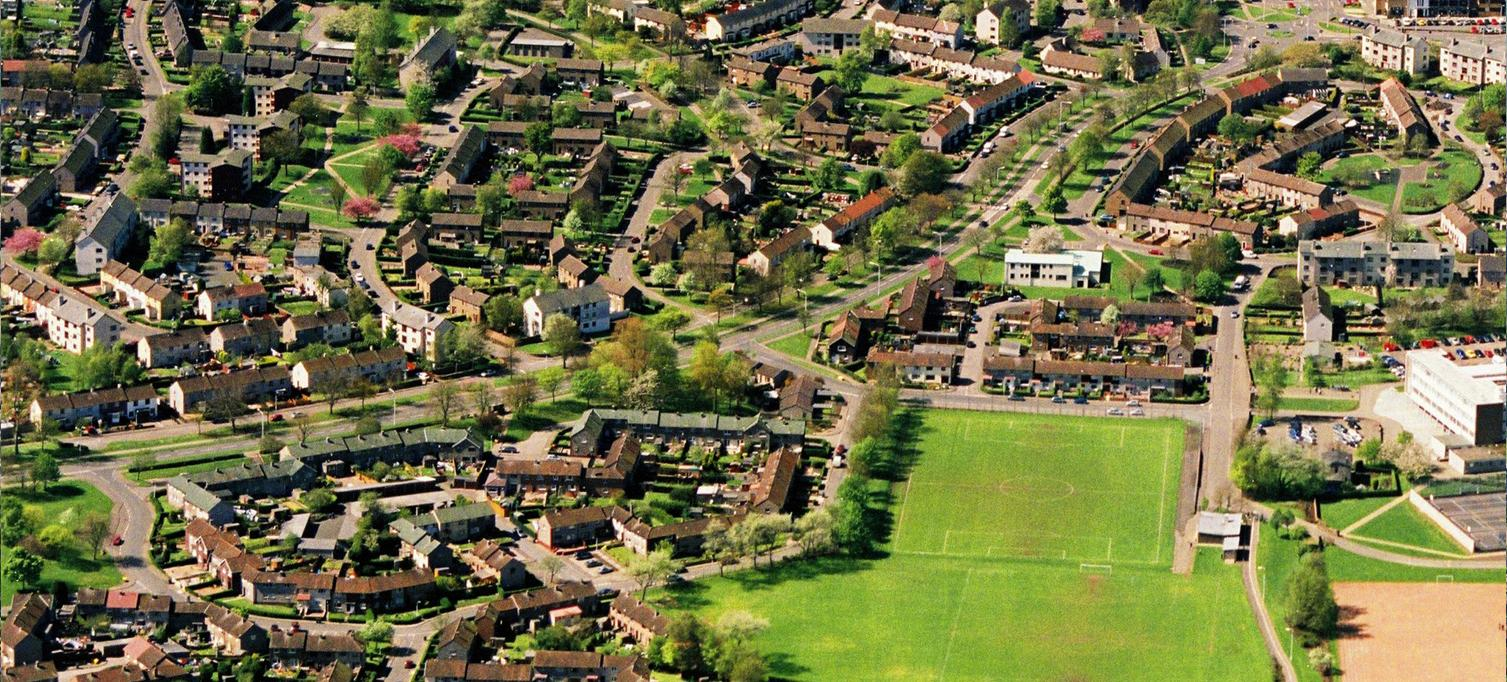
Aerial view of Auchmuty neighbourhood, Glenrothes

Careful consideration was given to the form and infrastructure of the town, focusing on the creation of individual suburban style neighbourhoods (precincts), each with their own architectural identity. Engineers, planners, builders and architects were tasked with creating not only good quality mass-produced housing but green spaces, tree planting, wildlife corridors and soft and hard landscaping. This was seen as an equally important part of the process, helping to provide a sense of place and connection to the land that a New Town was felt to need in order to become a successful place where people would want to live and raise children. Separating industry from housing areas in planned industrial estates was a key element of early plans. This was at the time seen as an important change from the "chaotic", congested and polluted industrial towns and cities of the previous centuries where cramped unsanitary housing and dirty industries were built in close proximity to one another.

The vision for Glenrothes was to provide a clean, healthy and safe environment for the town's residents. Much of the early housing, consistent with the other new towns and main growth areas in Scotland in the post-war period, was council housing delivered by the Glenrothes Development Corporation (GDC). This gave the GDC an even greater overall ability to implement its vision of a planned built environment while also fulfilling one of the primary aims of the new towns: to create mass housing for workers in areas that were to be centres of new industry and economic growth. The new homes simultaneously accommodated people being relocated from crowded "slum" areas in the industrial Central Belt (and Glasgow in particular). Although the latter was less of a priority for Glenrothes comparative to other Scottish new towns including East Kilbride and Cumbernauld which were more specifically planned to provide a so-called "overspill" function.

The settlement has been purposely planned using a series of masterplans. Development of Glenrothes started in Woodside in the east and progressed westwards with the first town masterplan delivering Auchmuty, South Parks and Rimbleton housing precincts. Early neighbourhoods were based on Ebenezer Howard's Garden City philosophy, using relatively tried and tested principles of town planning and architecture which is reflected in their housing styles and layouts. The first town masterplan sub-divided the town's designated area into self-contained residential precincts with their own primary schools, local shops and community facilities, consistent with other new towns being built elsewhere in the UK in the same period.

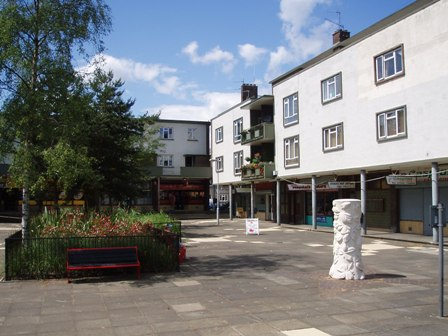
Woodside neighbourhood centre

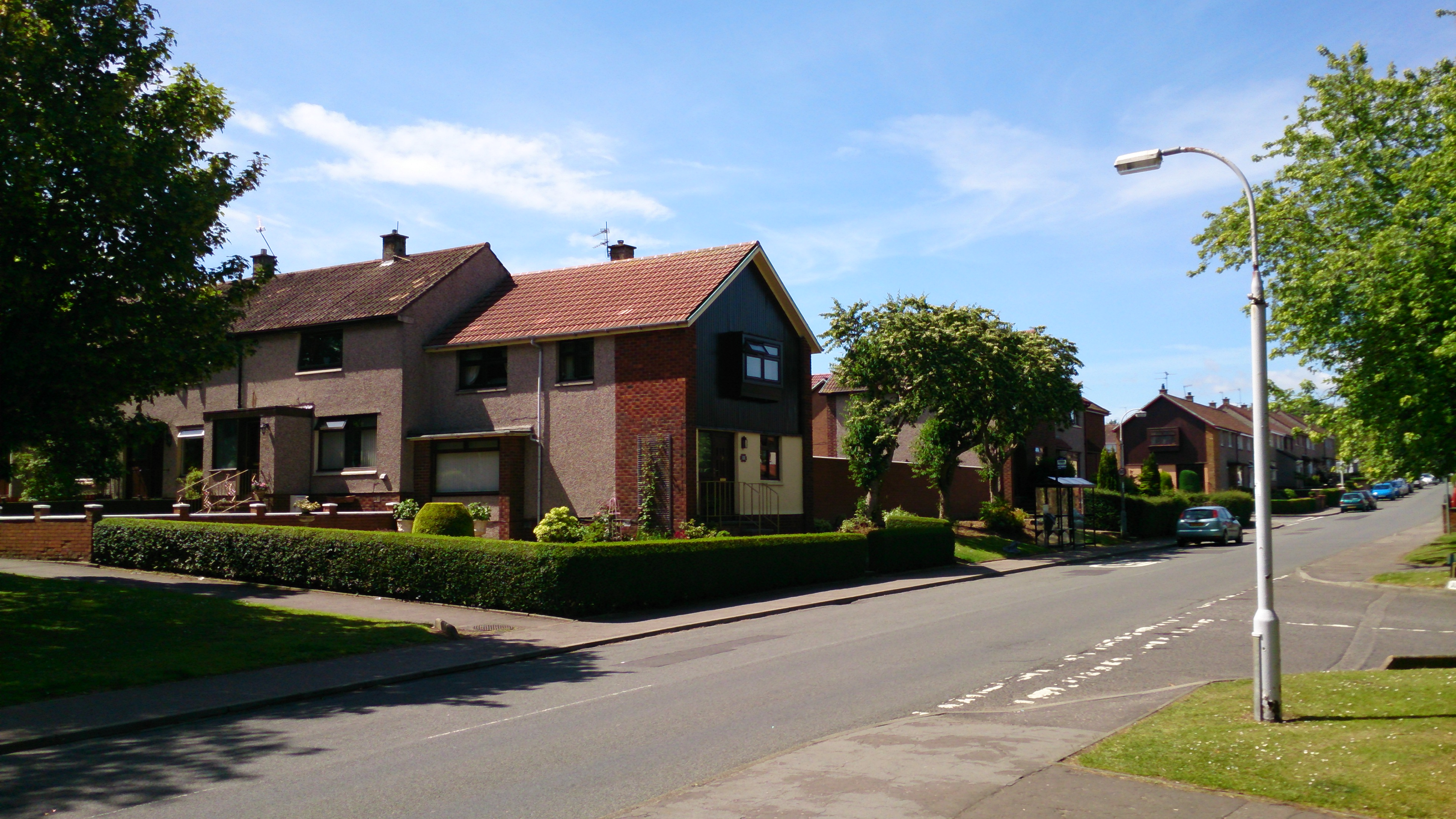
South Parks built in the 1950s

Pitteuchar built in the 1960s/1970s

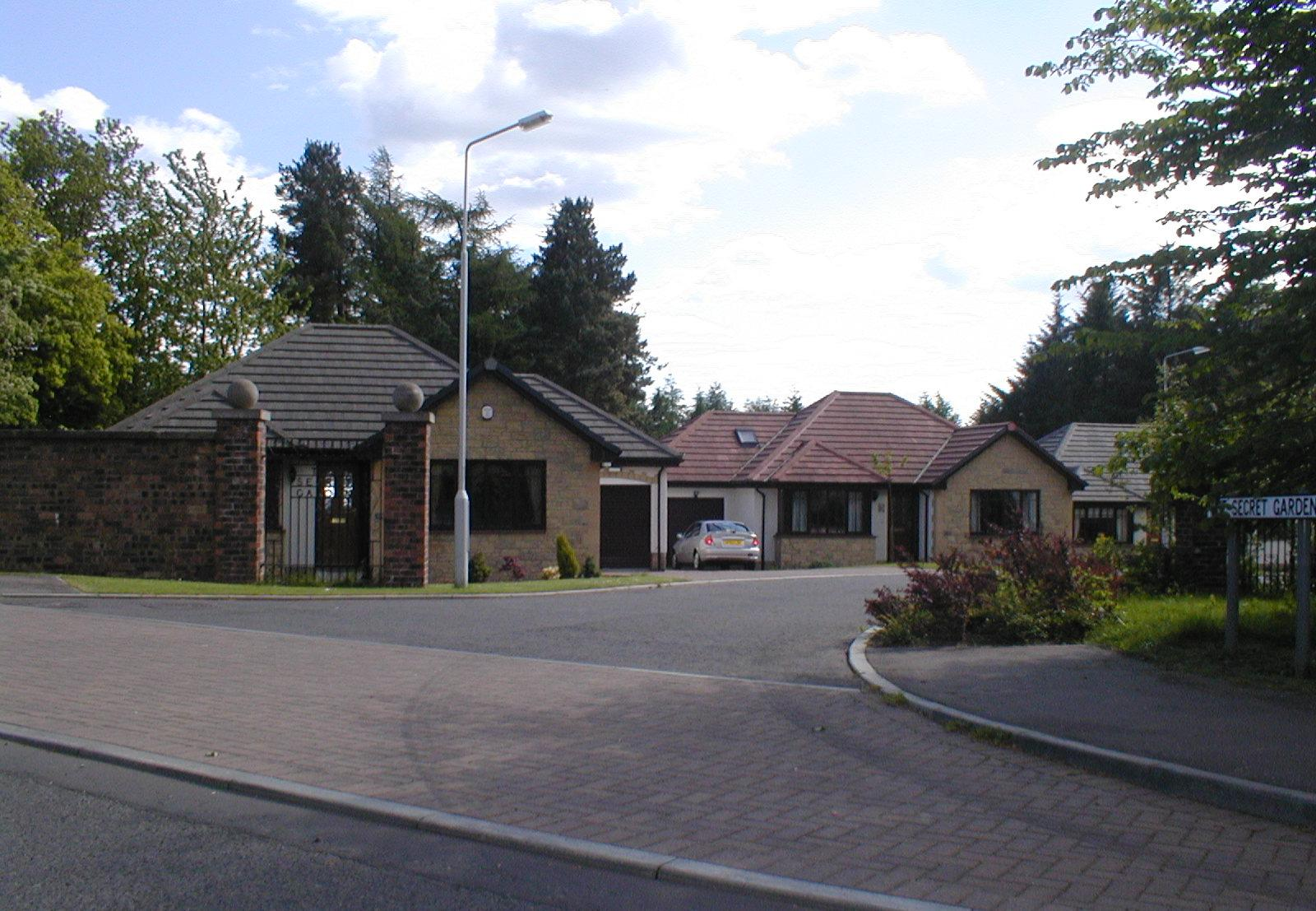
Balgeddie built in the 1990s/2000s

A second town masterplan was then developed in the late 1960s following Glenrothes' change of role and was to accommodate an increased population of 50,000–70,000. New areas of land in the north and south of the designated area were identified for new development. The road network was redesigned and upgraded to deal with projected increases in car ownership and new housing estates were developed to the west, then to the south and finally to the north of the designated area.

Housing precincts of the 1960s and 1970s, including Macedonia, Tanshall, Caskieberran, Pitteuchar and Cadham departed from the garden city ideals, adopting more compact urban forms and using Radburn principles; separating as far as practical footpaths from roads. The housing precincts were designed to accommodate increases in car ownership which increased considerably from the 1960s onwards. The townscape changed in this period seeing more use of contemporary architectural styles of the time and newer forms of development layouts. Terraced housing with occasional blocks of flats were predominantly developed and housing designs also used flat roofed and mono pitch roof styles to create variety. The fronts of houses were in many instances designed to face onto public footpaths and open spaces. Car parking was kept either to the rear of properties or in parking bays located nearby in efforts to minimise conflict with pedestrians. This concept evolved in later GDC designed estates including at Balfarg, Collydean, Pitcoudie and Stenton where segregated footpaths were used in combination with emerging Dutch Woonerf principles of adopting shared space in parking courts as a means to reduce vehicular speeds in residential areas.

Housing precincts built from the 1980s onwards at Balgeddie, Finglassie, Formonthills, Pitcairn and Whinnyknowe were developed by the private sector with the majority of this housing developed in low density suburban cul-de-sacs. Areas of structural planting, tree belts and open spaces were purposely designed to blend housing and factories into the hillsides and local landscape.

=== Geology ===
The Glenrothes area's geology is predominantly made up of glacial deposits with the subsoil largely consisting of boulder clay with a band of sand and gravel in the area to the north of the River Leven. The river valley largely comprises alluvium deposits and there are also igneous intrusions of olivine dolerite throughout the area. Productive coal measures were largely recorded in the southern parts of Glenrothes, approximately south of the line of the B921 Kinglassie road. These coal measures form part of the East Fife coalfield and prior to 1962 the deposits there were to be worked by the Rothes Colliery, until it was found that there were severe issues with water penetration and subsequent flooding. Smaller limestone coal outcrops that had been historically worked were recorded around the Balbirnie and Cadham/Balfarg areas with the land that is now Gilvenbank Park found particularly to be heavily undermined.

=== Climate ===
Like most of central Scotland, Glenrothes has a maritime climate. Glenrothes has a much milder climate than other places at its latitude such as Moscow and Edmonton. Summer is often temperate with temperatures between 18 °C and 25 °C. Winter is mild with temperatures between 0 °C and 10 °C; the temperature rarely falls below -5 °C due to its proximity to the ocean and the Gulf Stream.

== Demography ==
In 1950 the population in the Glenrothes designated area was about 1,000 people, located in the hamlets of Woodside and Cadham and in the numerous farm steadings that were spread throughout the area. Population growth in the early phases of the town was described as slow due to the dependence on the growth of jobs at the Rothes Colliery. In 1960 the town population was shown to have increased to 12,499 people, and it had risen to 28,098 by 1969. The fastest growth was between 1964 and 1969, with average inward migration of 1,900 persons per year. In 1981 Glenrothes' population was estimated at 35,000 and at the time the GDC was disbanded in 1995 it was estimated to be just over 40,000.

Glenrothes compared according to 2022 Scotland's census
| | Glenrothes | Fife | Scotland |
|---|---|---|---|
| Total population | 37,468 | 371,781 | 5,436,600 |
| Total households (with residents) | 16,831 | 169,573 | 2,509,300 |
| Percentage Scottish identity only | 75.05% | 68.49% | 65.5% |
| Over 75 years old | 9.39% | 9.79% | 8.9% |
| Unemployed | 2.2% | 2.3% | 2.06% |

The 2001 census recorded the population of Glenrothes at 38,679 representing 11% of Fife's total population. The 2011 census recorded a 1.5% population rise to 39,277. The 2022 census saw the town's population drop by around 1,800 people to 37,468.

The total population in the wider Glenrothes area was estimated at 48,461 in 2025. 61% of the population is of working age (16–64 years). Glenrothes is broadly similar to Fife for the percentage of homes which are owner occupied (65%) social rented (24%) or private rented (10%). The Area has a higher employment rate (78.4%), and a lower rate of those who are classed as economically inactive (19.1%) compared to the Fife and Scottish Averages. The Glenrothes and Mid Fife (UK Parliament constituency) Area's median weekly income was calculated at £739.20 (residents earnings) and £701.30 (workplace earnings) in 2025.

The working age population of the town in 2022 was 27,369 with 65.44% of population recorded as economically active by the census. The number of out-of-work benefit Jobseekers Allowance/Universal Credit claimants at December 2025 in the Glenrothes area was 955 representing a 3.2% rate, slightly higher than the Fife (3%) and Scottish (2.9%) averages, but lower than the UK average of 3.8%. Scottish Index of Multiple Deprivation (SIMD) figures indicate that Auchmuty, Cadham, Collydean, Macedonia and Tanshall areas in Glenrothes fall within the 20% most deprived communities category in Scotland.

== Economy ==
Employment by Sector, Glenrothes and Fife 2023 (Source: ONS Business Register & Employment Survey 2023)
| | Glenrothes | Fife | Scotland |
|---|---|---|---|
| Number of jobs | 22,000 | 135,000 | 2,536,200 |
| A. Agriculture, forestry and fishing | 0.11% | 0.71% | 2.2% |
| B. Mining and quarrying | 0.05% | 0.09% | 0.9% |
| C. Manufacturing | 15.91% | 9.63% | 6.7% |
| D. Electricity, gas, steam and air conditioning supply | 0.68% | 0.30% | 0.8% |
| E. Water supply; sewage, waste management and remediation activities | 0.68% | 0.44% | 0.7% |
| F. Construction | 3.64% | 5.93% | 6.4% |
| G. Wholesale and retail trade; repair of motor vehicles and motorcycles | 13.64% | 15.56% | 11.9% |
| H. Transport and storage | 2.73% | 5.19% | 4.4% |
| I. Accommodation and food service activities | 4.55% | 8.15% | 7.6% |
| J. Information and communication | 0.57% | 2.96% | 2.5% |
| K. Financial and insurance activities | 0.57% | 2.22% | 3.4% |
| L. Real estate activities | 1.82% | 0.93% | 1.8% |
| M. Professional scientific and technical activities | 2.73% | 4.44% | 7.7% |
| N. Administrative and support service activities | 2.73% | 5.19% | 6.0% |
| O. Public administration and defence, compulsory social security | 22.73% | 7.41% | 6.4% |
| P. Education | 6.82% | 10.37% | 8.4% |
| Q. Human health and social work activities | 10.23% | 14.81% | 15.1% |
| R,S,T,U. Other | 5.91% | 5.55% | 7.2% |

The Glenrothes area's economy predominantly comprises manufacturing and engineering industries, service sector, health and public sector jobs. In 2023, around 22,000 people were employed in the Glenrothes area; approximately 16.3% of the 135,000 jobs in Fife. Glenrothes is recognised for having the main concentration of advanced manufacturing and engineering companies in Fife. There are a total of 46 "Top 200 Fife Businesses" located in Glenrothes and there was a recorded 532,100 square metres (5,727,477 ft^{2}) of industrial and business floorpace within the town's employment areas following a survey carried out in 2014 with the largest concentrations of premises in the south of the town and around the town centre. Major employment areas in Glenrothes include: Bankhead, Eastfield, Pentland Park, Queensway, Southfield, Viewfield, Westwood Park and Whitehill.

=== Industry ===
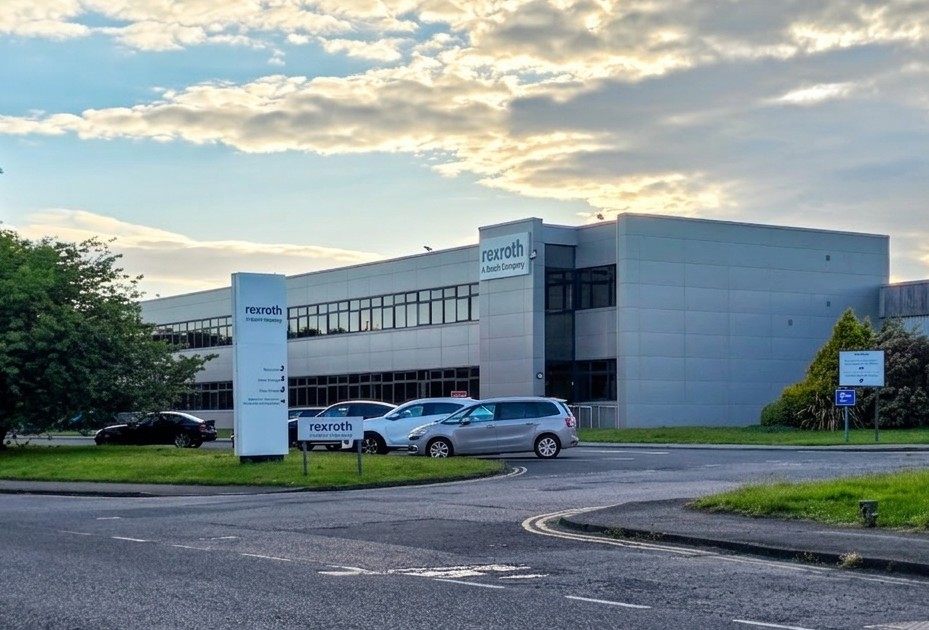
Bosch Rexroth facility, Viewfield

Semefab facility, Eastfield

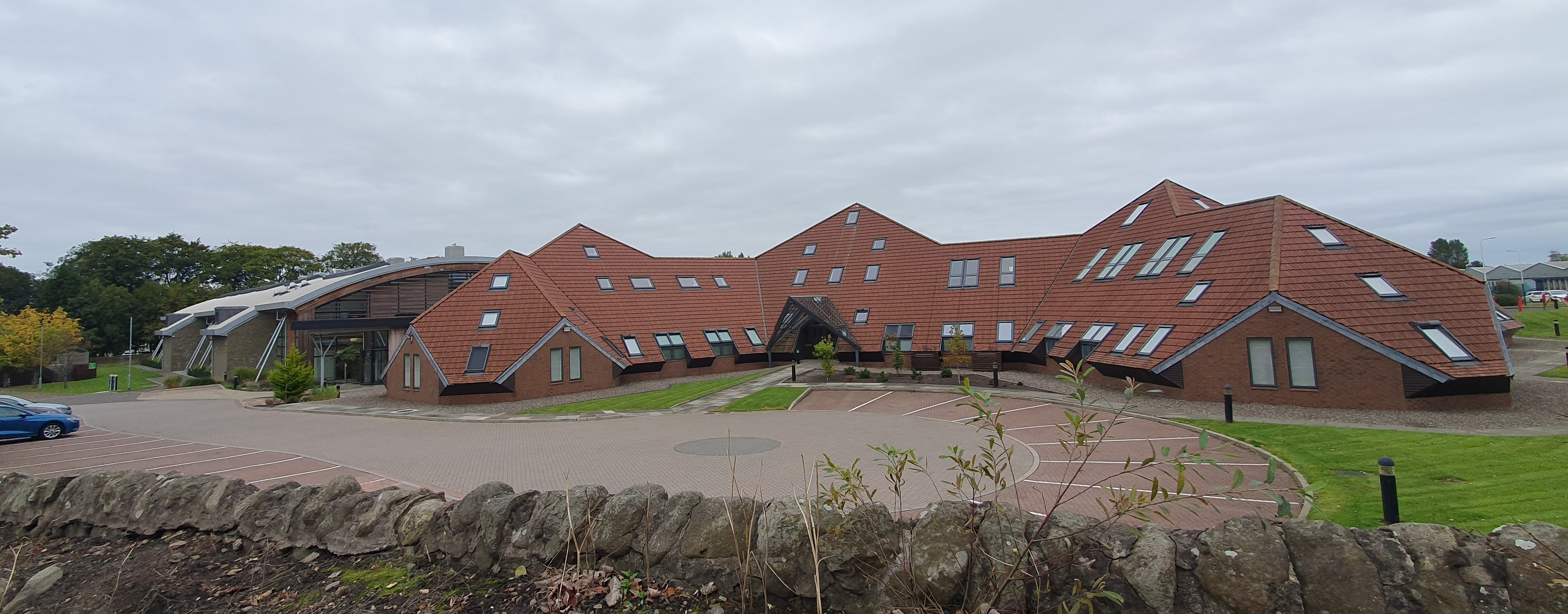
Velux (UK and Ireland) HQ in Eastfield

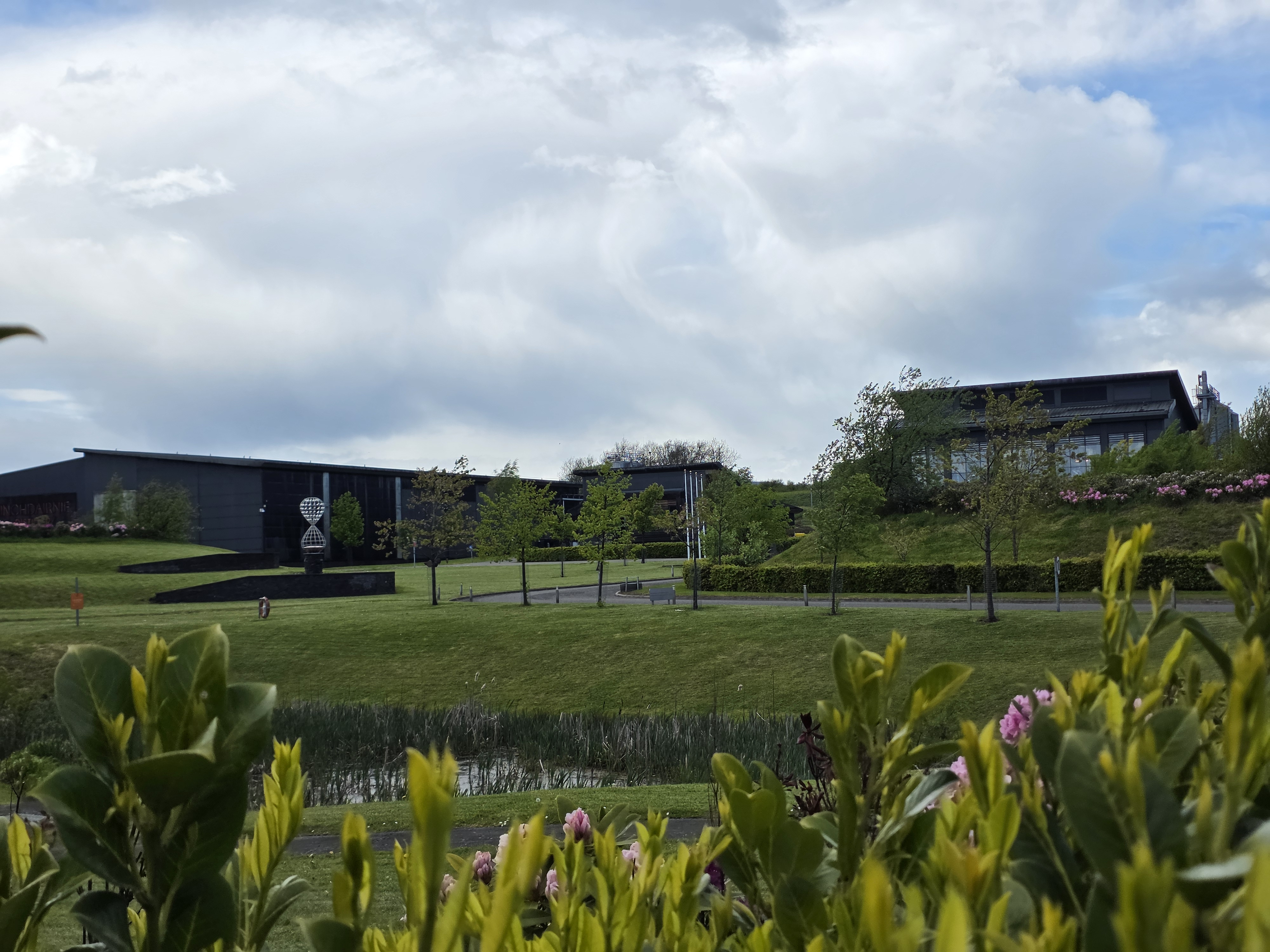
Inchdairnie Distillery, Whitehill

The 2022 census showed that manufacturing accounted for almost 13% of employment in Glenrothes. A number of high tech industrial companies are located in the town largely specialised in electronics manufacturing making the Glenrothes area one of Scotland's largest clusterings of electronics companies. These are what remain of Silicon Glen operations in the area which gradually reduced and then consolidated since the peak in the late 1990s. Local companies specialised in this sector include Compugraphic which develops photomasks for the microelectronics sector, CTDI which provides technology repair and test services, Leviton which produces fibre optic cabling, Raytheon which specialises in electronics for the defence industry and Semefab which produces Micro Electric Mechanical Systems (MEMS). Other major companies which have established a base in Glenrothes include Bosch Rexroth (hydraulics manufacturing), FiFab (precision engineering) and Velux (Window and Skylight Manufacturers).

In 2013 Indian beverages group Kyndal entered into a joint venture with John Fergus & Co Ltd to establish a new Scotch whisky distillery and bonded warehouse facility in Glenrothes. The new distillery, named Inchdairnie opened in May 2016. It is located at Whitehill Industrial Estate adjacent to Fife Airport. The distillery is one of the first in Scotland to embark on a significant decarbonisation programme and was awarded UK Government funding as part of a 'Green Distilleries Competition' in January 2021. This will specifically focus on the potential to use hydrogen at the distillery to significantly decarbonise the process heat required. The hydrogen could be produced two ways, by converting the gas generated at the local AD plant to hydrogen onsite and through electrolysis of local renewables onsite. This will reduce the overall carbon footprint of the distillery.

Roof window manufacturer Velux announced in October 2018 that it was delivering a £7 million expansion to its UK and Ireland headquarters in Glenrothes. The firm's head office building was renovated and a 3,500 square metre new build structure was developed alongside the existing office, housing a customer service centre, training facilities, office space, meeting suite and a staff restaurant. Like the current building, the extension showcases Velux products, such as its modular skylight system, flat roof windows and sun tunnels.

Dutch-owned firm Scotch Whisky Investments (SWI) developed a bonded whisky storage facility in 2023 in Southfield Industrial Estate delivering around 38 full-time jobs. SWI aims to deliver a centre of excellence in Glenrothes for the support of the cask investment and storage market that allows Scotch to age on site, creating high-quality matured whisky. The development comprises whisky storage warehouses, maintenance and bottling buildings and offices. The first phase of development delivered £10 million of inward investment to the town with longer-term development aspirations to expand operations on the site. Alongside its plans for Glenrothes, SWI is also aiming to deliver a new visitor centre that will showcase and educate people about single malt Scotch whisky in nearby Falkland.

=== Retail, leisure and service sectors ===
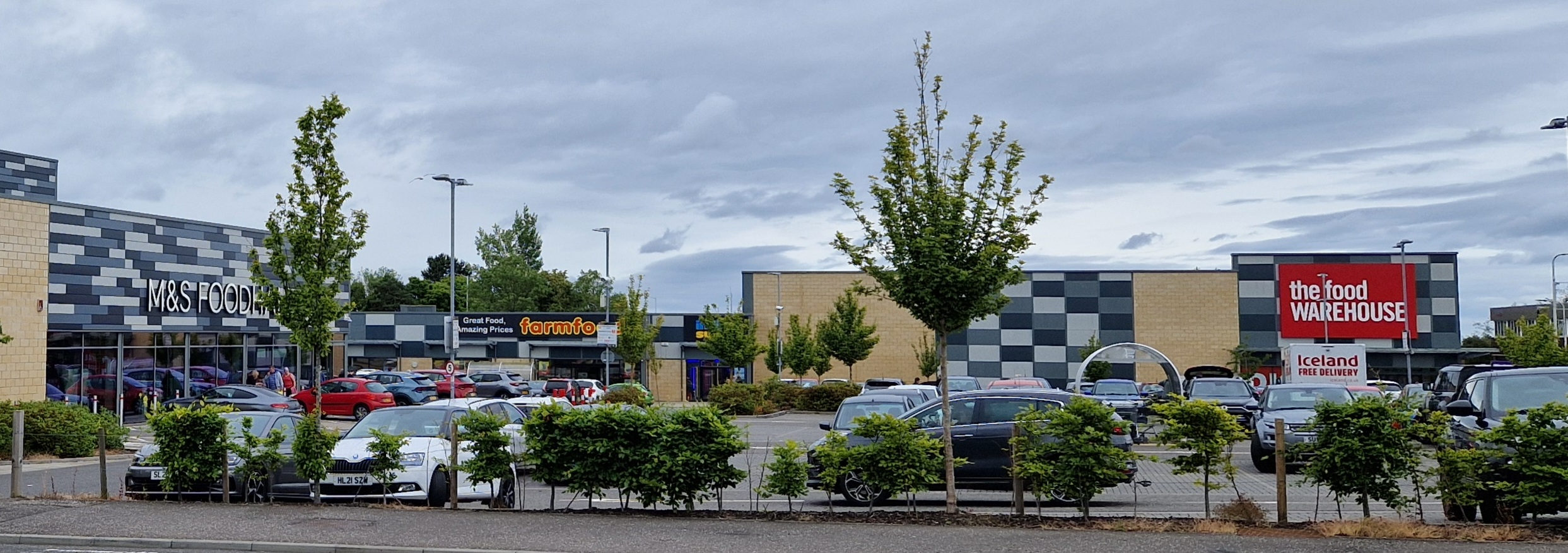
Modern shop units on North Street in Glenrothes town centre

Retail jobs accounted for approximately 13% of the total number of jobs in the local economy in 2022 as recorded by the census. The majority of shopping, retail services and administrative facilities in Glenrothes are concentrated in the town centre (central business district). With approximately 120 shop units, the Kingdom Shopping Centre provides the largest concentration of retail and services in the town centre. New shop and drive-thru units were delivered at North Street between 2018 and 2021 anchored by a M&S foodhall.

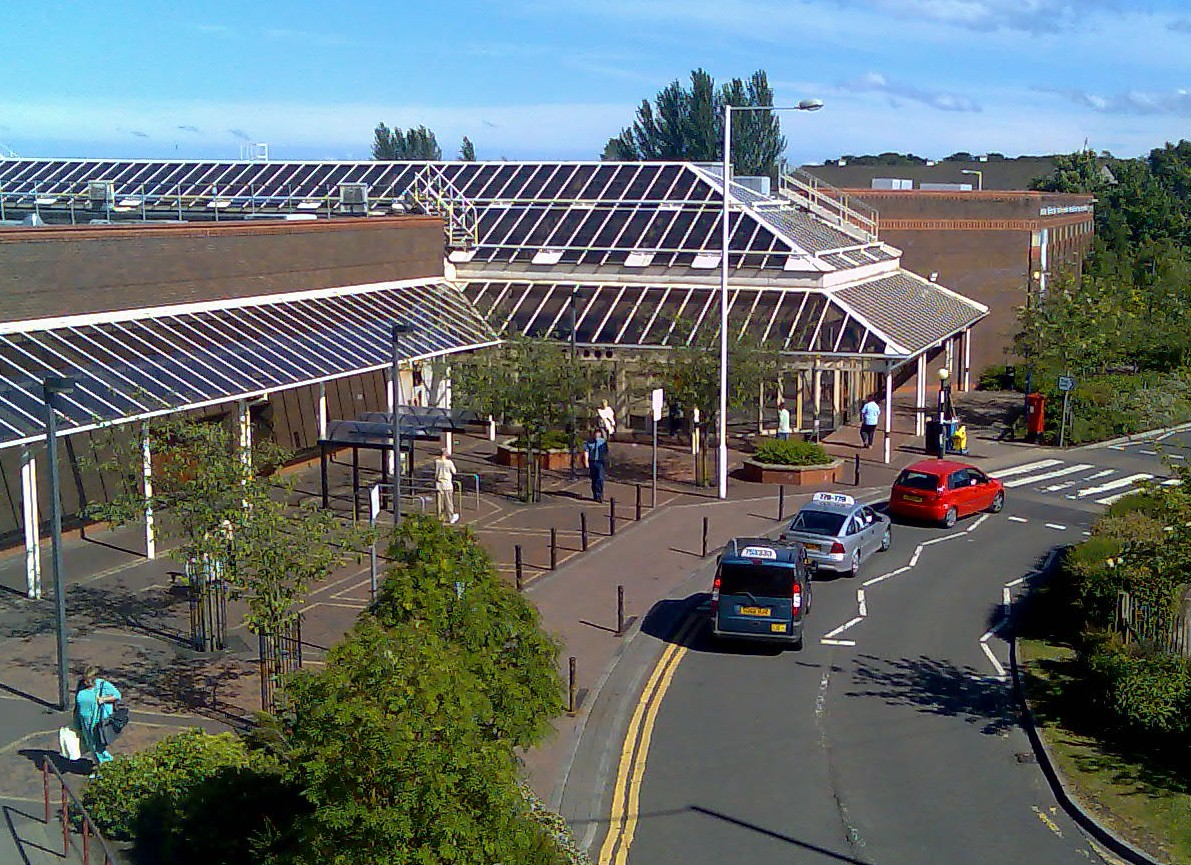
Kingdom Shopping Centre western entrance

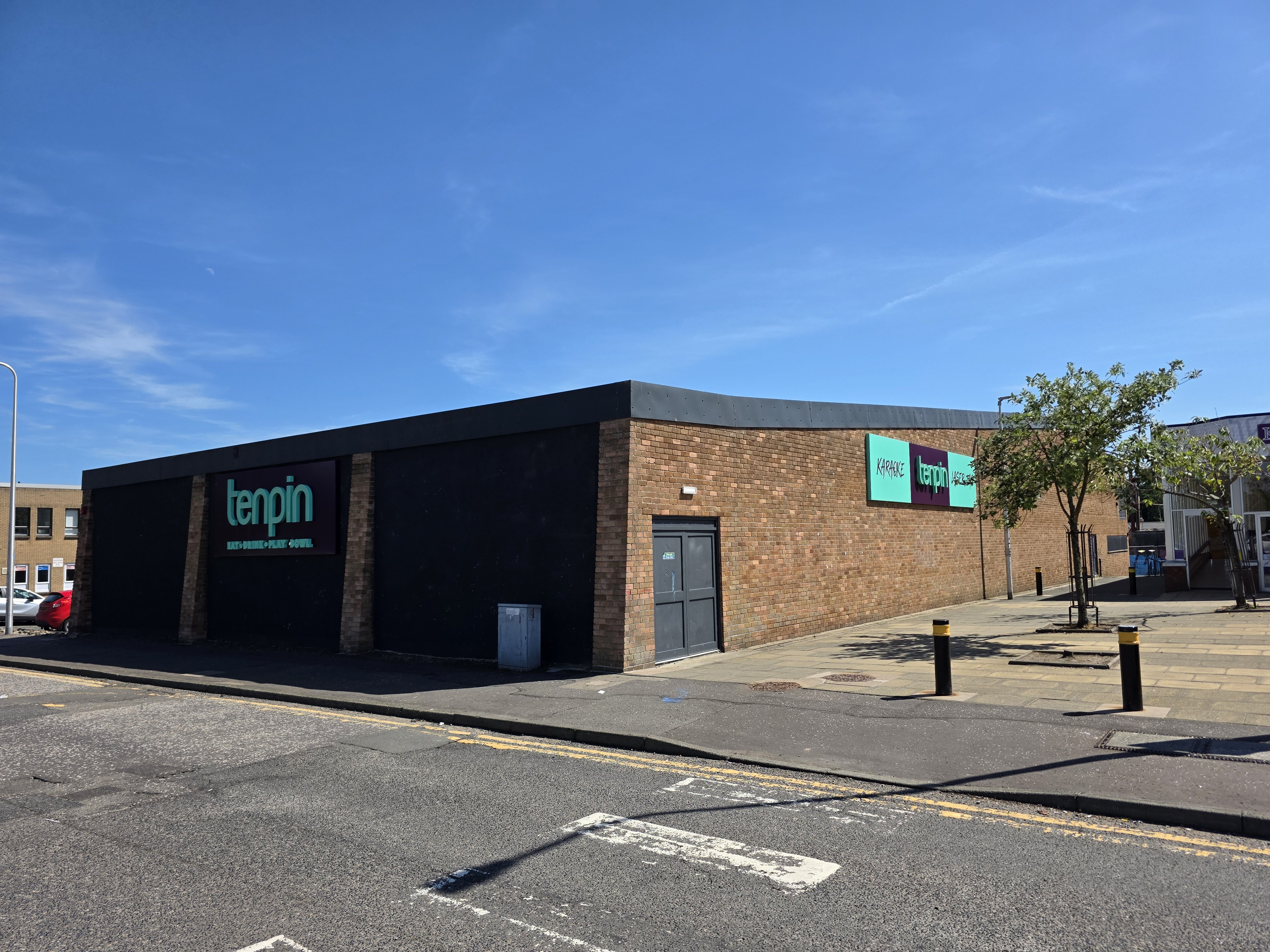
Tenpin facility, Glenrothes town centre

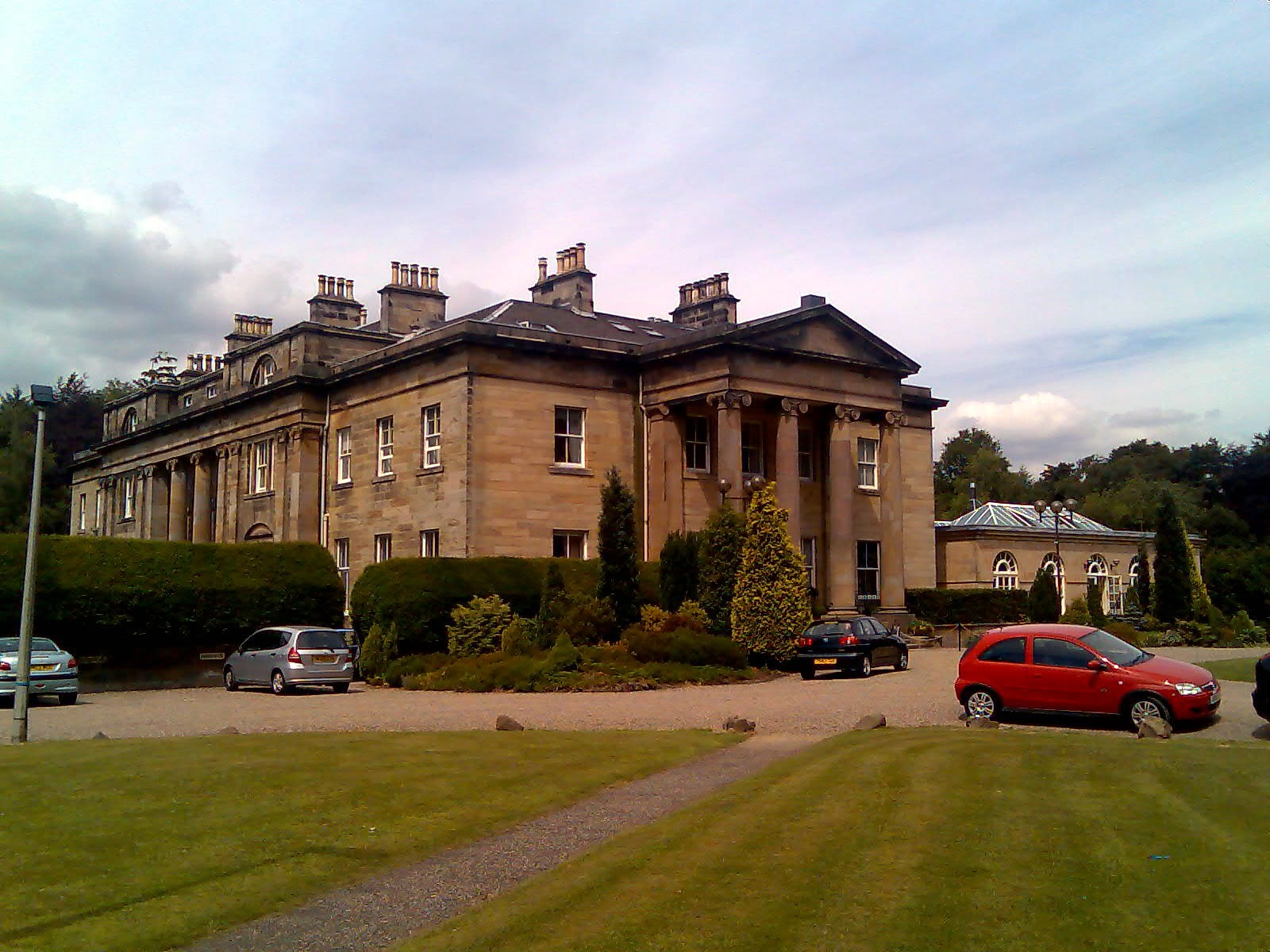
Balbirnie House Hotel

Community and commercial leisure facilities within the town centre include the Rothes Halls complex; Glenrothes' principal theatre, library, civic and exhibition centre. In a unit opposite this, is a large indoor trampoline park, soft play and arcade facility which opened in 2025 relocating from the Saltire Centre retail park. A cinema, restaurant, pub and bingo hall complex are located adjacent to the Kingdom Centre at Carrick Gate/Church Street. Tenpin bowling facilities are available at Albany Gate. The Gym Group also operate from a facility at Rothesay Place/North Street.

A number of retail operators including the town's major supermarkets are also located in the Queensway business park located adjacent to the town centre. The town's largest retail employers, Asda and Morrisons, both trade from large stores there. A retail park has also been constructed at the Saltire Centre, approximately one-half mile (0.80 km) to the southwest of the town centre containing major stores.

Other types of service industries also add to the town's economic mix with large single employers being in the 'accommodation and food services' sector which accounted for around 5% of the town's total jobs. Balbirnie House Hotel, a four star hotel, Balgeddie House Hotel (a Best Western hotel) and Premier Inn, both three stars, are the largest hotels in Glenrothes. Budget hotels include the Golden Acorn Hotel, the Gilvenbank Hotel, a Travelodge and a Holiday Inn Express. Balbirnie House was awarded the "Best Wedding Hotel" Global Award at the Haute Grandeur Global Hotel Awards for five consecutive years between 2019 and 2024.

A range of other services including Information and Communication, Financial and Insurance, Real Estate, Professional Scientific and Technical, Administrative and Support sectors are also operating in Glenrothes. Offices are mainly concentrated in the town centre and at Pentland Park. An enterprise hub facility was opened in the town centre in 2017 to act as a "one-stop shop" supplying increased enterprise and business services to potential entrepreneurs in the local area.

=== Public and voluntary sectors ===
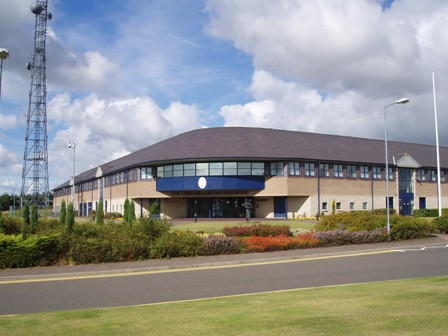
Police Scotland Fife Division HQ, Viewfield

A number of public service and third sector agencies and authorities are based in Glenrothes contributing to the town's administrative centre function. Police Scotland has established its Fife Division headquarters in Glenrothes at Viewfield. Scottish Environment Protection Agency (SEPA), Scottish Enterprise and Kingdom Housing Association, a major Registered Social Landlord also have offices in Glenrothes at Pentland Park; a business park within the town. Fife College is also a key employer in Glenrothes with a large campus based at Stenton Road adjacent to Viewfield Industrial Estate. Fife Council is a major employer in the locality with its prominent local authority headquarters building located in Glenrothes town centre. Other council departments are located at a major depot and office facility at Bankhead in the former ADC building.

=== Regeneration and future development ===
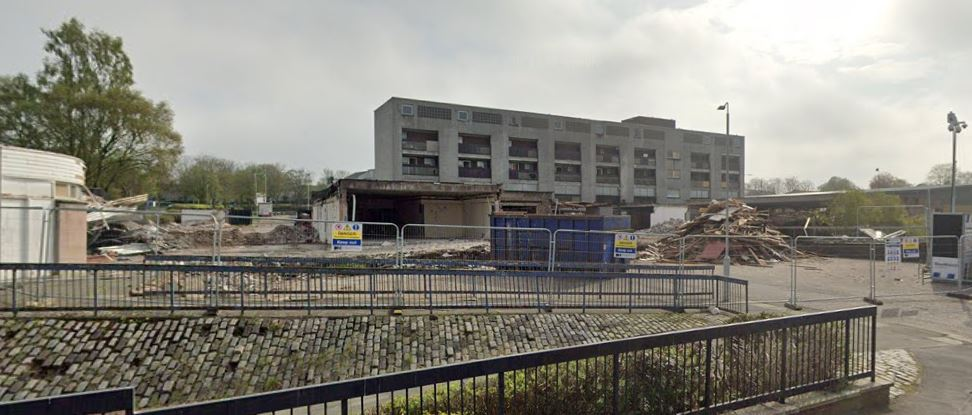
Demolition of the former Glenwood Neighbourhood Centre (2023)

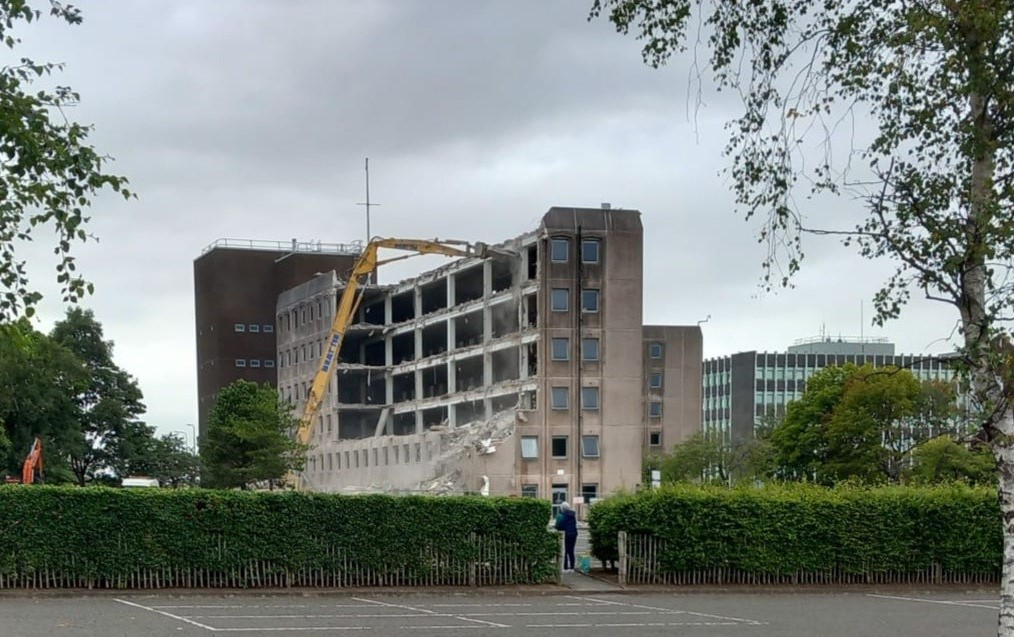
Rothesay House office block demolition in town centre (2024)

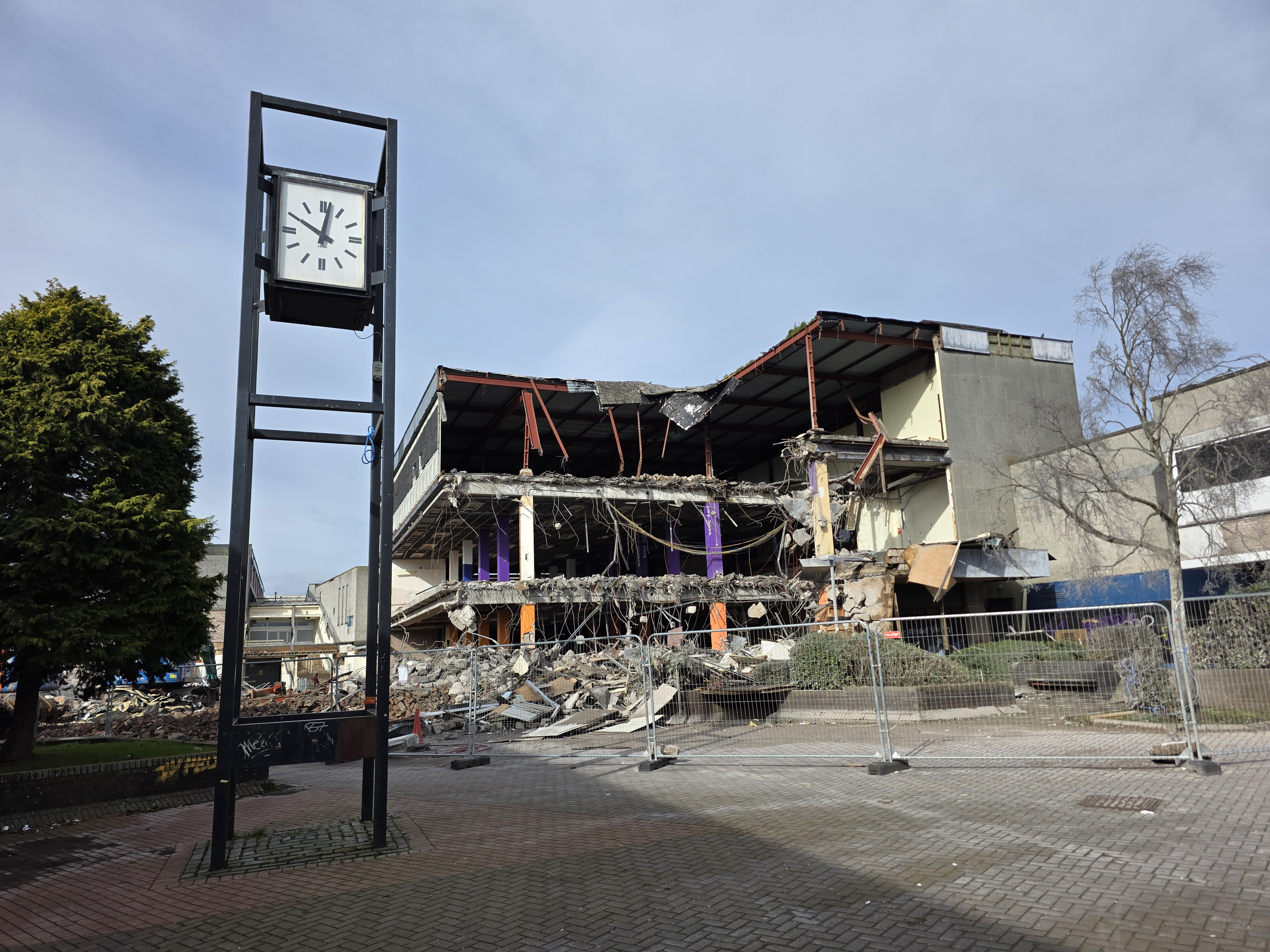
Demolition works at Albany Gate in Glenrothes town centre (2026)

A range of development projects are proposed to regenerate the town centre steered by a masterplan that was approved by the Glenrothes Area Committee in March 2021. This seeks to address a variety of negative trends including addressing the reduction in retail operators and office floorspace in the town centre due to changing market requirements and working practices, including the rationalisation of Fife Council's office estate. The masterplan also recommends creating new public spaces and meeting areas including a new town square, celebrating and augmenting the unique legacy of public art bequeathed to the town, introducing new business opportunities outwith the Kingdom Shopping Centre, re-purposing vacant shop units and supporting an enhanced leisure offering and evening economy. Demolition works of older parts of the Kingdom Shopping Centre at Albany Gate started in 2026 with plans to landscape the site in anticipation of future redevelopment. A mixed use redevelopment of the former police station site at Napier Road was outlined in the masterplan and proposals for this site were approved by Fife Council in early 2023. Fife Council announced in 2023 its intention to demolish Rothesay House as part of ongoing regeneration activity in the town centre.

Major housing developments are taking place in the area, including at the former Tullis Russell papermills, Cadham Road, Markinch South and at Westwood Park which will collectively deliver over a thousand new build homes between 2022 and 2030.

There are also proposals to support the regeneration of the western neighbourhoods, centered around the Glenwood centre. A charrette was held in 2017, facilitated by PAS and supported by design experts, Fife Council and the Scottish Government to inform an action plan for the future of the area. The Glenwood Centre was subsequently demolished in 2023 making way for the regeneration of the area. Fife Council is replacing the demolished centre with new affordable homes and a community hub facility.

Glenrothes is to be home to the UK's First 100% Green Data Centre which is to be built at Queensway Technology Park. Once complete this will represent a significant economic development for the area and will play a strategically important part in Scotland's IT infrastructure transformation as a whole. The £40 million development will create over 300 construction jobs during the build process and up to 50 full-time posts created on completion, including technical and operational staff. The facility will be the first of its kind in the UK drawing its energy from a renewable source with power coming directly from the RWE biomass plant in the town. Queensway Data Centre will accommodate up to 1500 high performance computer racks offering the highest levels of resilience and data security. The facility will be built to a BREEAM outstanding standard with a power usage effectiveness rating of less than 1.15.

Approval was given in December 2024 for the development of a timber and manufacturing facility, a construction skills academy and a crematorium at Southfield. Respect Developments (Scotland) Ltd and Dignity Funerals Ltd who are delivering the project suggest that the development will provide 120 new jobs as part of the skills academy and manufacturing facility, comprising 80 apprentices and 40 factory workers. A total of five classrooms would be provided within the building to accommodate learning opportunities. It is anticipated that around 10-15 new jobs would be provided as part of the crematorium. In addition to jobs when in operation, there will also be a significant amount of construction jobs created.

== Culture and community ==
=== Public artworks ===
In 1968 Glenrothes was the first town in the UK to appoint a town artist. This is now recognised as playing a significant role, both in a Scottish and in an international context, in helping to create the idea of art being a key factor in creating a sense of place. Two town artists, David Harding (1968–78) and Malcolm Robertson (1978–91), were employed in the lifetime of the Glenrothes Development Corporation (GDC). Both artists, supported by a number of assistants, created a large variety of artworks and sculptures, around 140 pieces, that are scattered throughout the town. Malcolm Robertson produced the "Giant Irises" sculpture as Glenrothes' contribution to the Glasgow Garden Festival. The sculpture was the winner of the John Brown Clydebank award for the "Most Original and Amusing Artifact" and following the festival, it was re-erected at Leslie Roundabout.

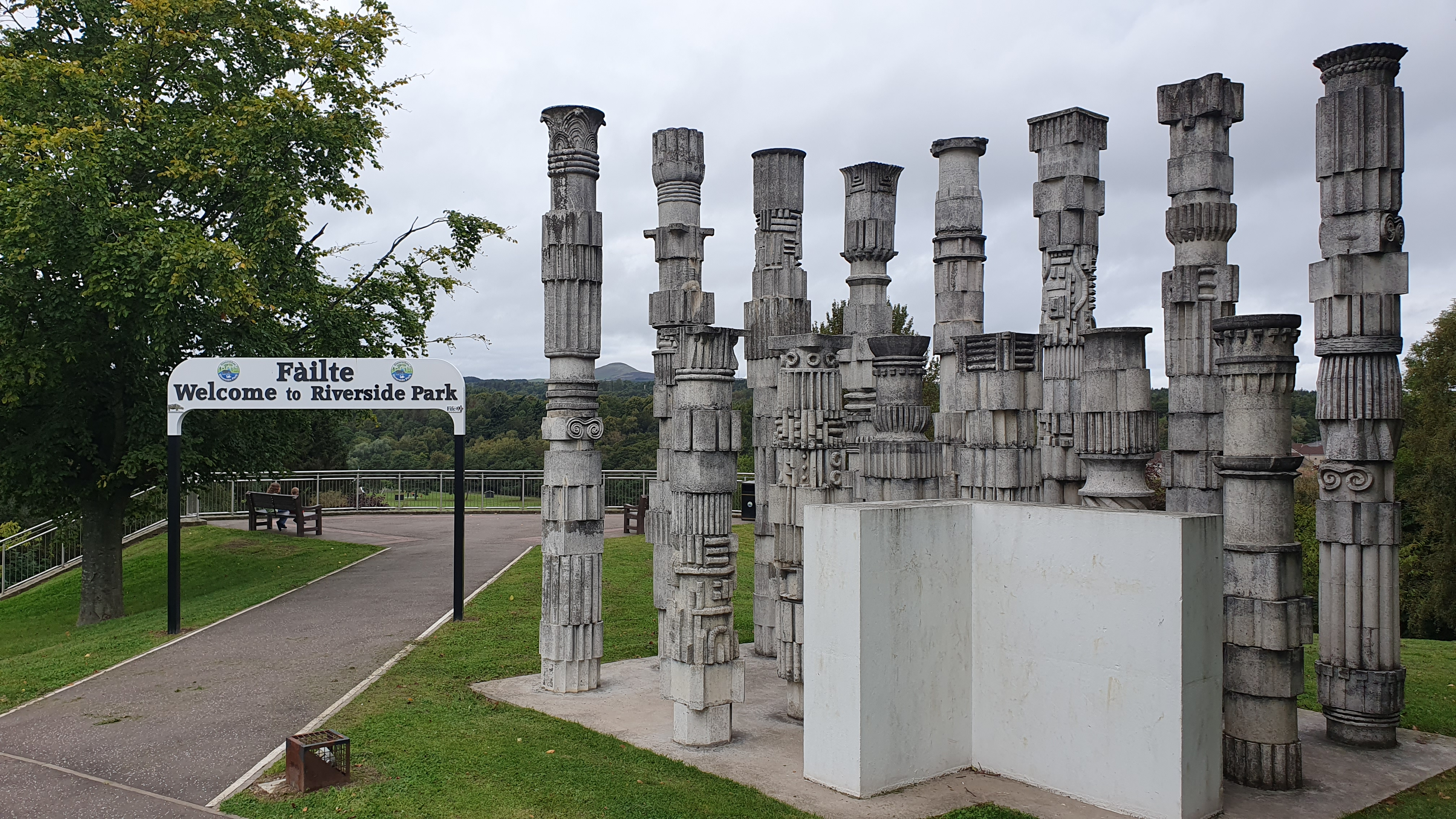
"The Heritage" by David Harding

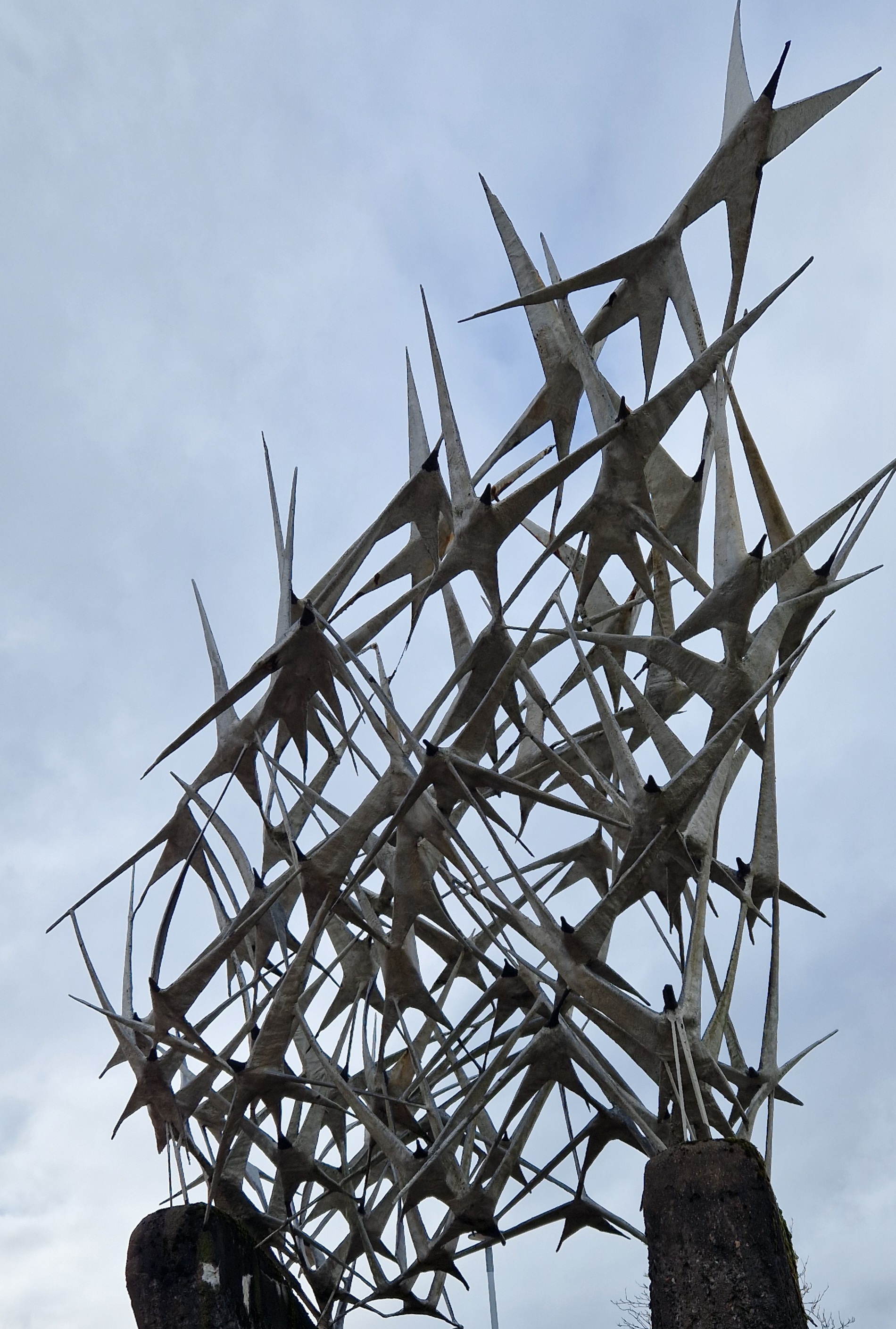
"The Birds" by Malcolm Robertson

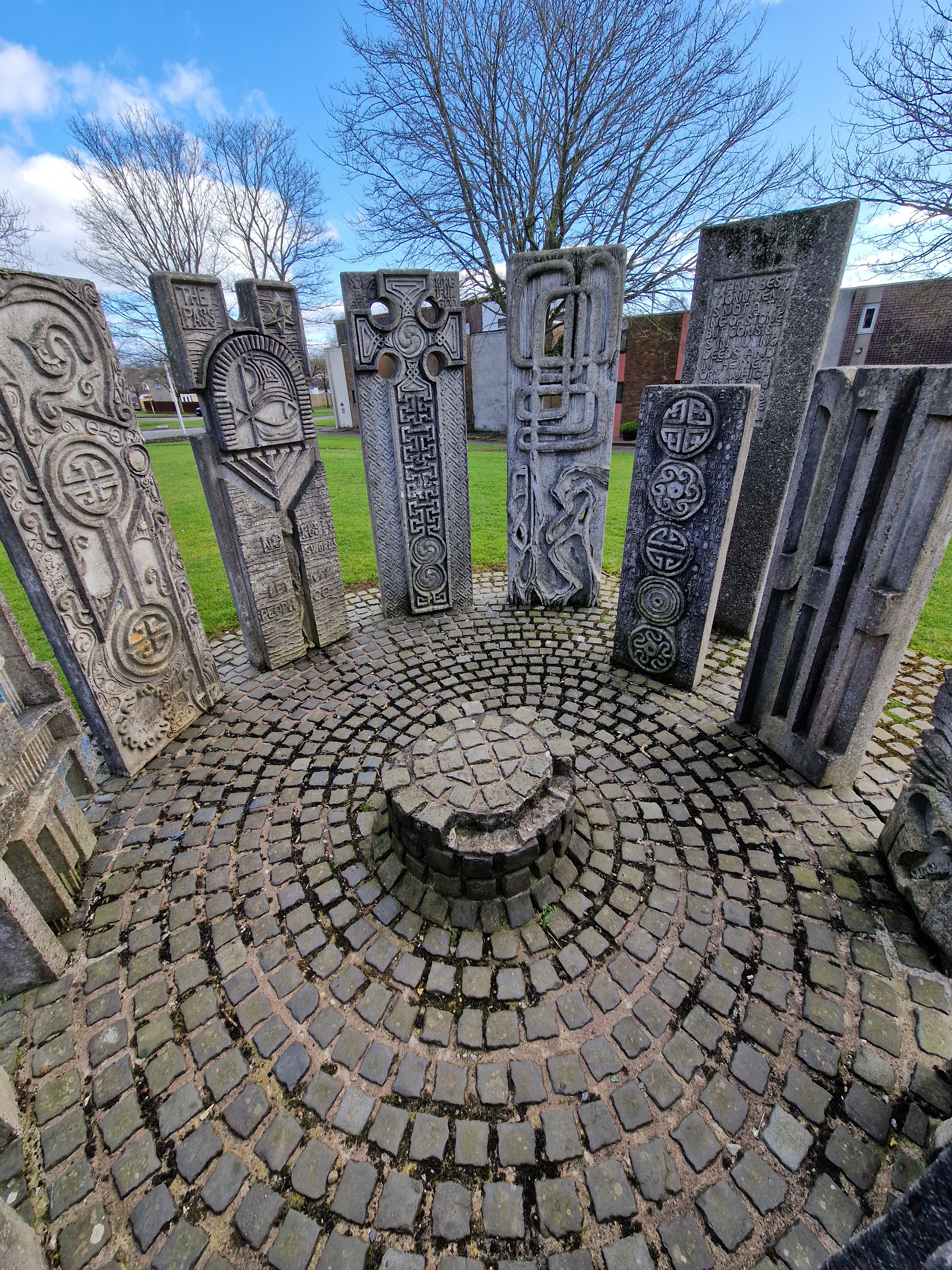
"Henge" by David Harding

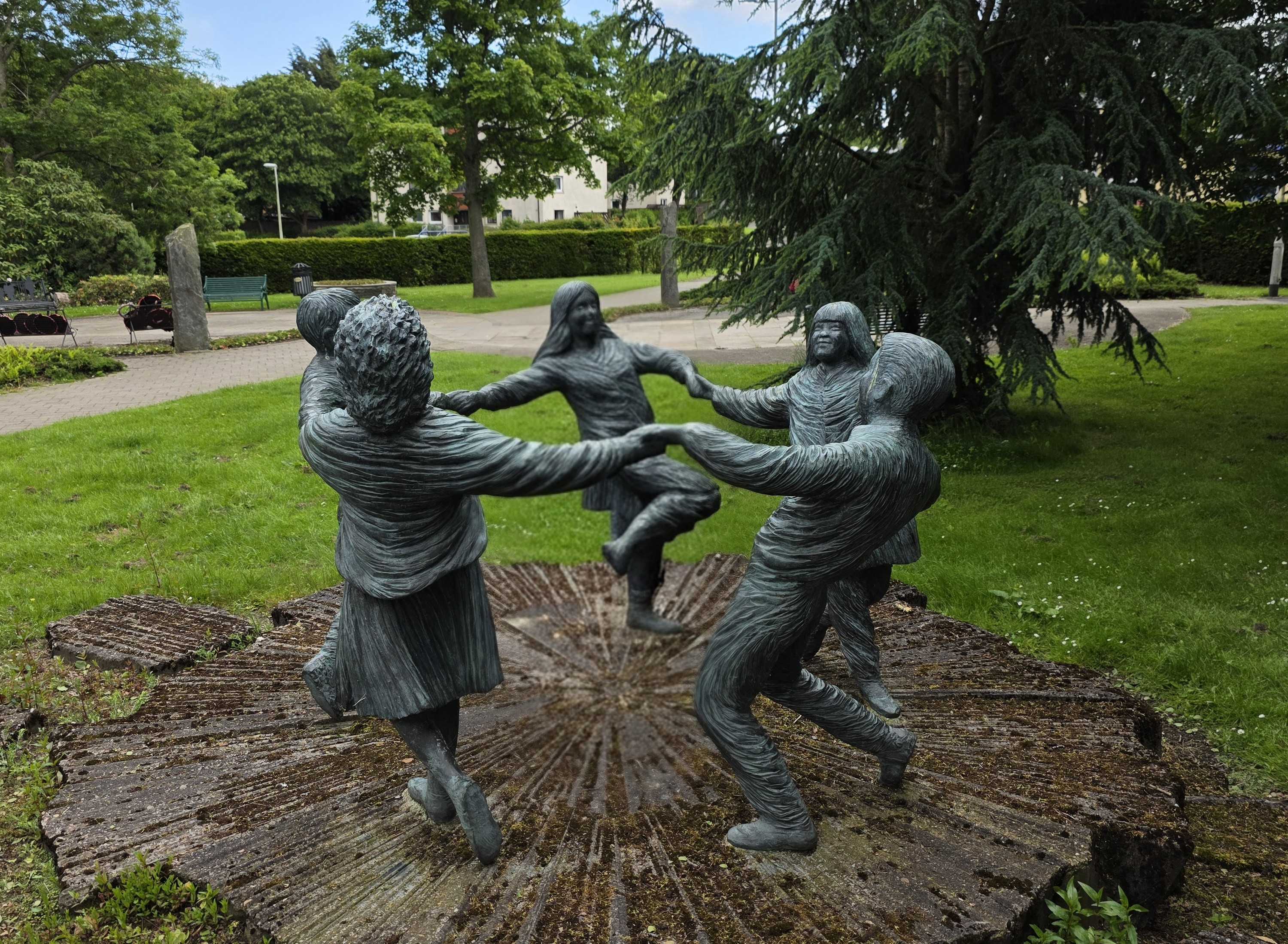
"The Dream" by Malcolm Robertson

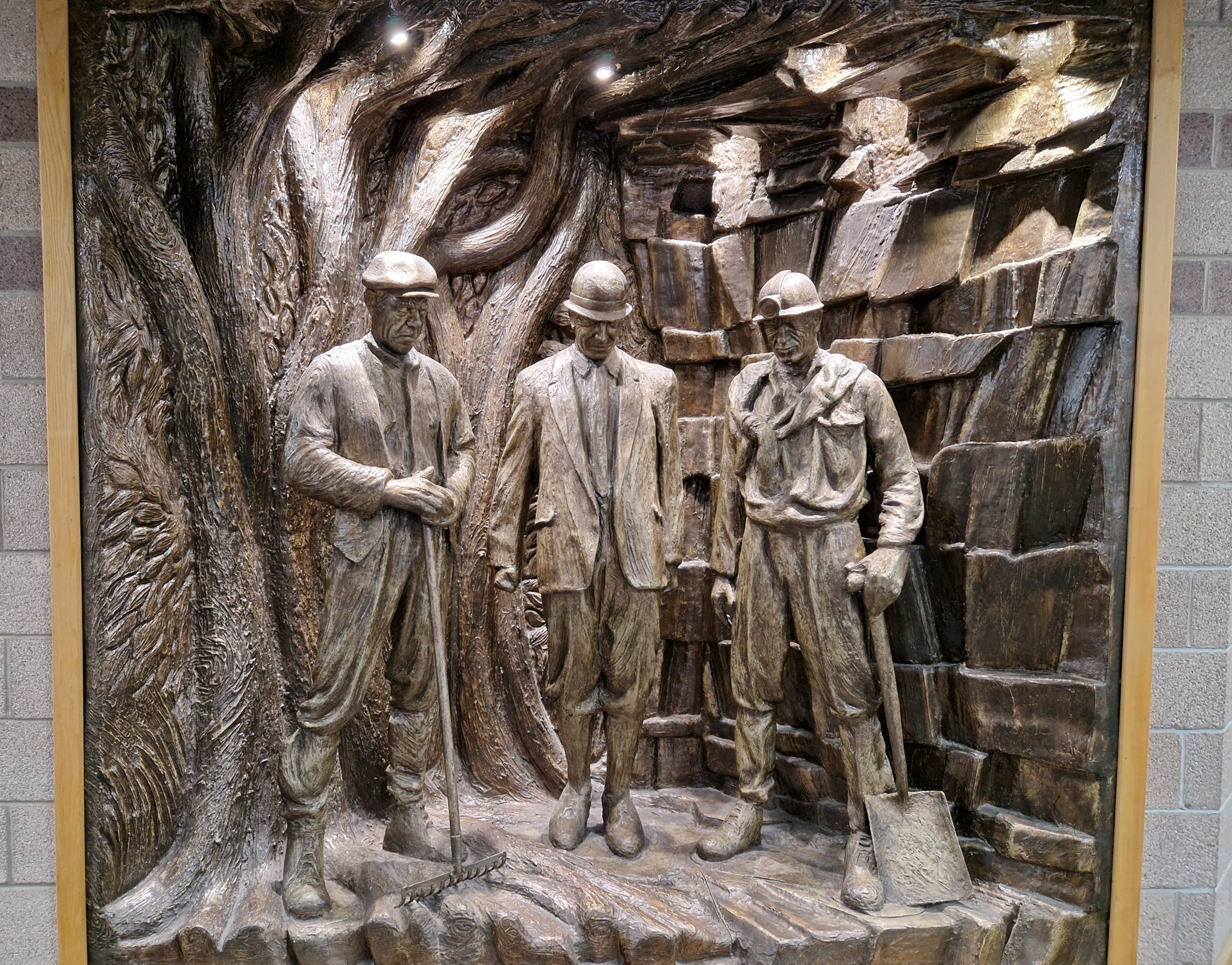
'Rothes Remembered' sculpture by Malcolm Robertson

Other artists have also contributed to the creation of the town's artworks. The first sculpture erected in Glenrothes was "Ex Terra", created by Benno Schotz which was inspired by the town's motto Ex Terra Vis (Latin) meaning "From the earth strength". "The Good Samaritan" sculpture in Riverside Park was produced by Edinburgh-based sculptor, Ronald Rae, who was commissioned by the GDC to produce a piece of art work in celebration of the town's 40th anniversary in 1988. The concrete hippos scattered throughout the town were designed and created by Stanley Bonnar who went on to be the town artist at East Kilbride.

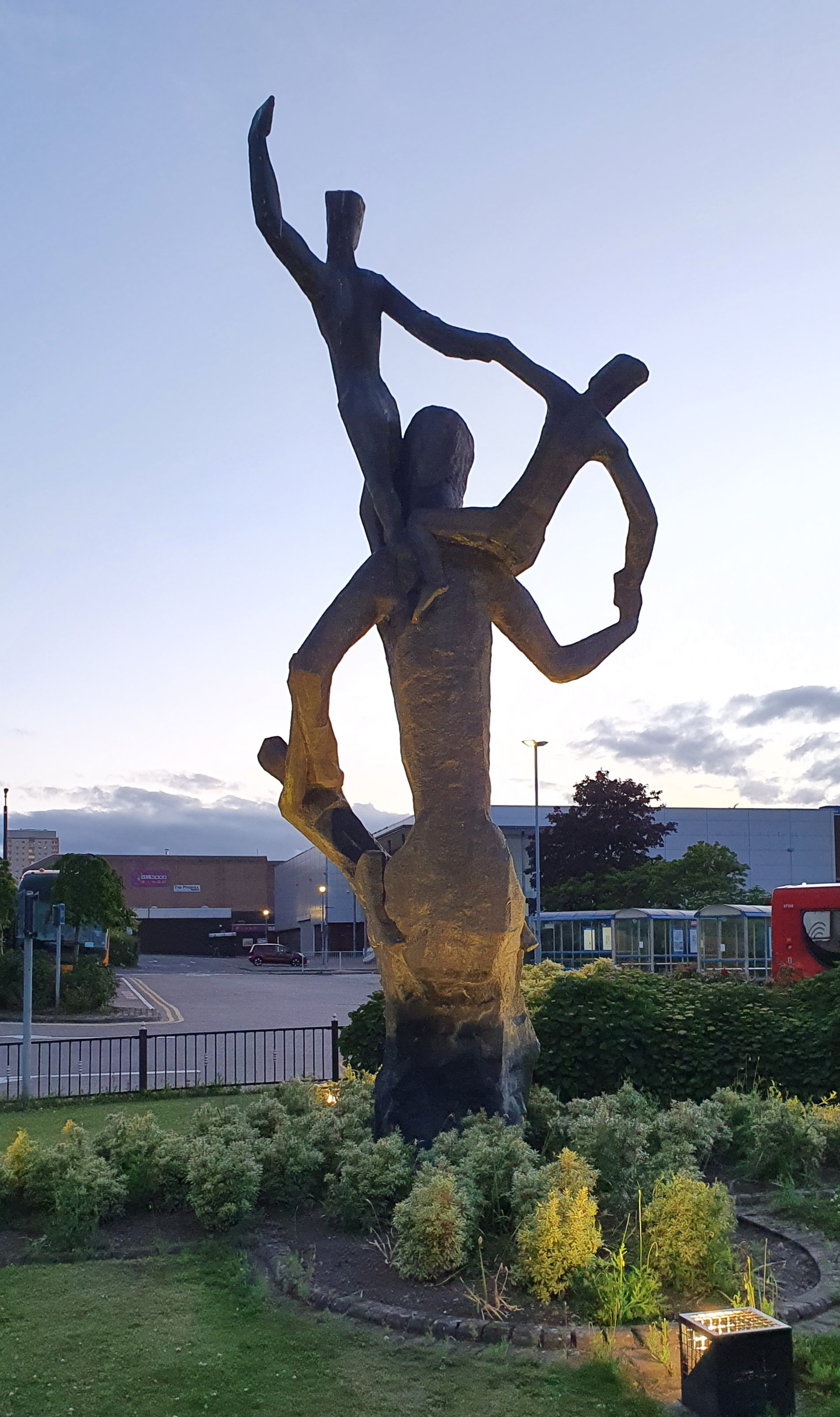
"Ex Terra" sculpture by Benno Schotz

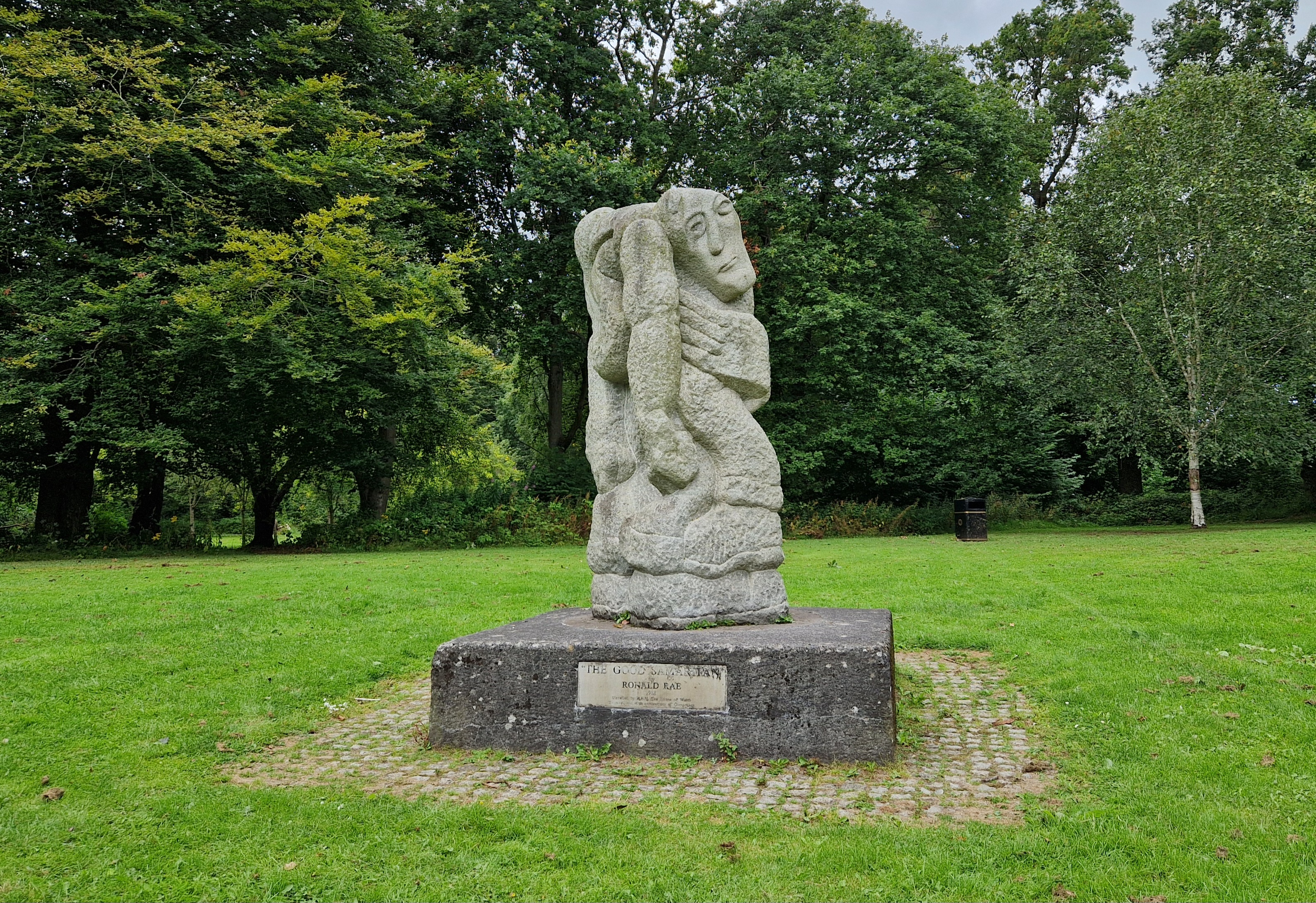
"The Good Samaritan" by Ronald Rae

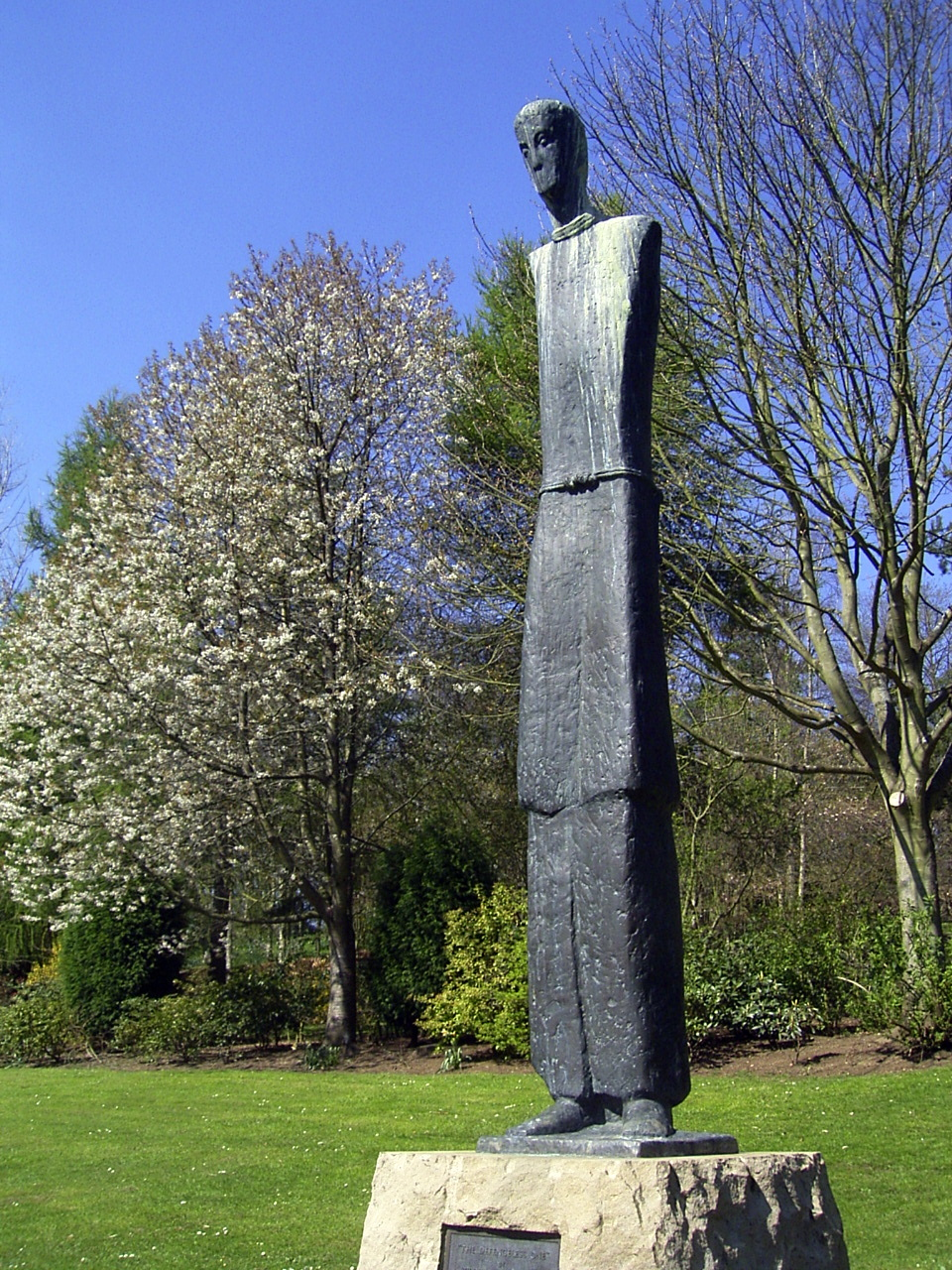
"The Defenceless One" by Rudolf Christian Baisch

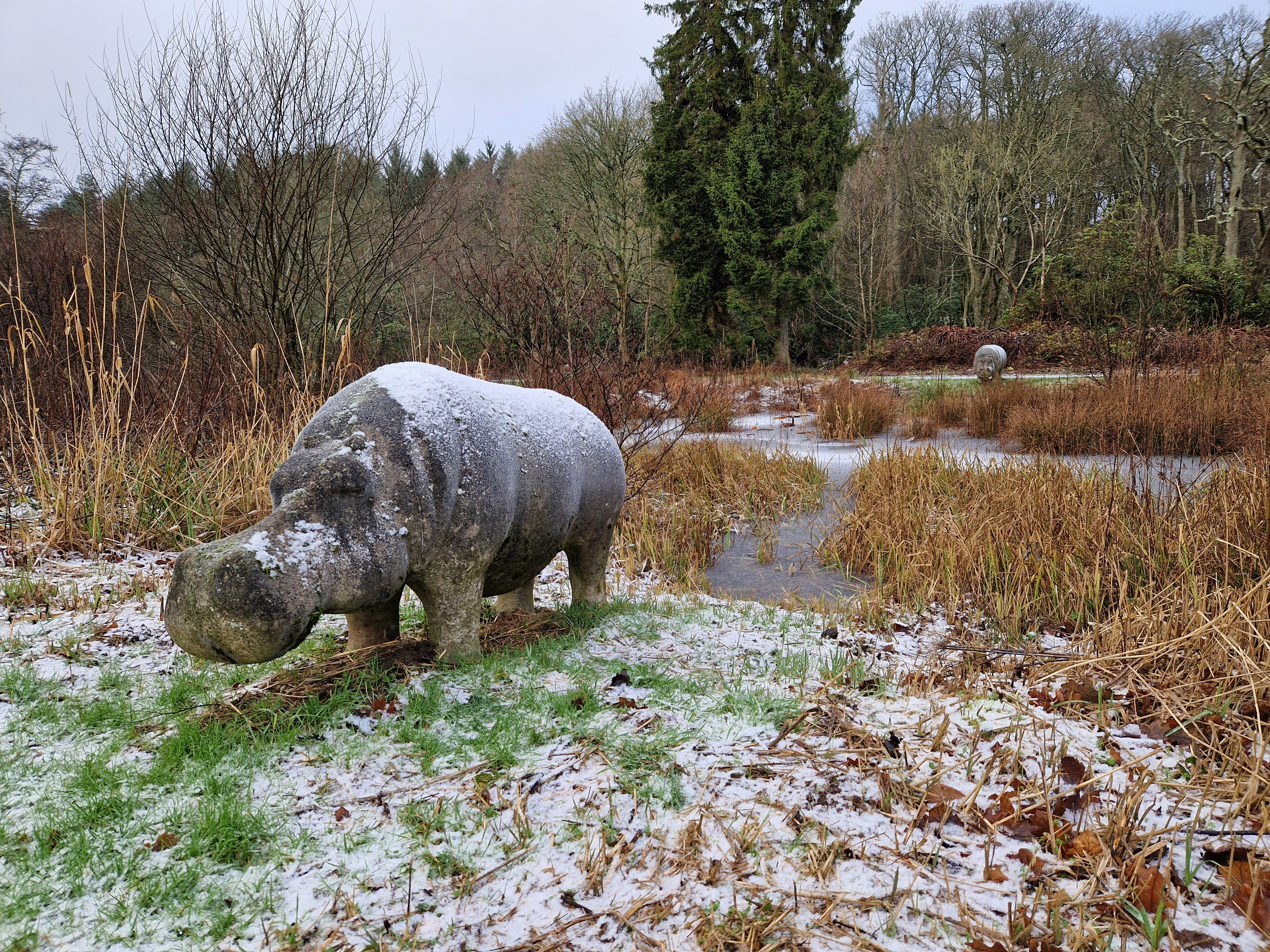
"Hippos" by Stanley Bonnar

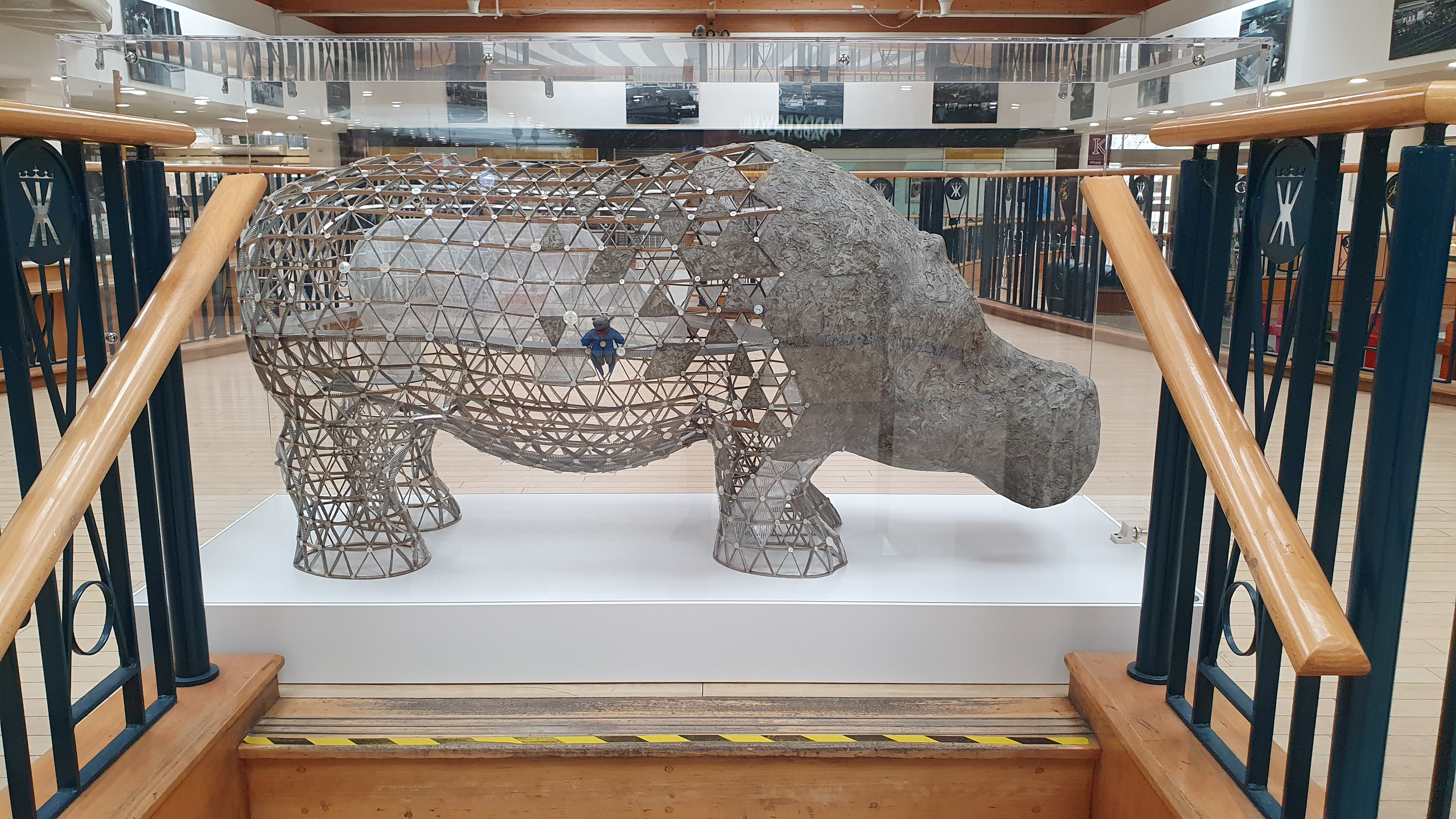
"The Disappearing Hippo" by Stanley Bonnar

Four pieces of Glenrothes artworks have been awarded listed status by Historic Environment Scotland. "Ex Terra" has been listed at Category B and "The Birds", "The Henge" and "Work" (or Industry, Past and Present) at Category C.

Coinciding with the town's 75th anniversary on 30 June 2023 a new public artwork was unveiled in the town centre named "The Disappearing Hippo", created by Stanley Bonnar. It is constructed using recycled tin cans and other sustainable materials bringing a conservation message.

=== Civic and heritage facilities ===
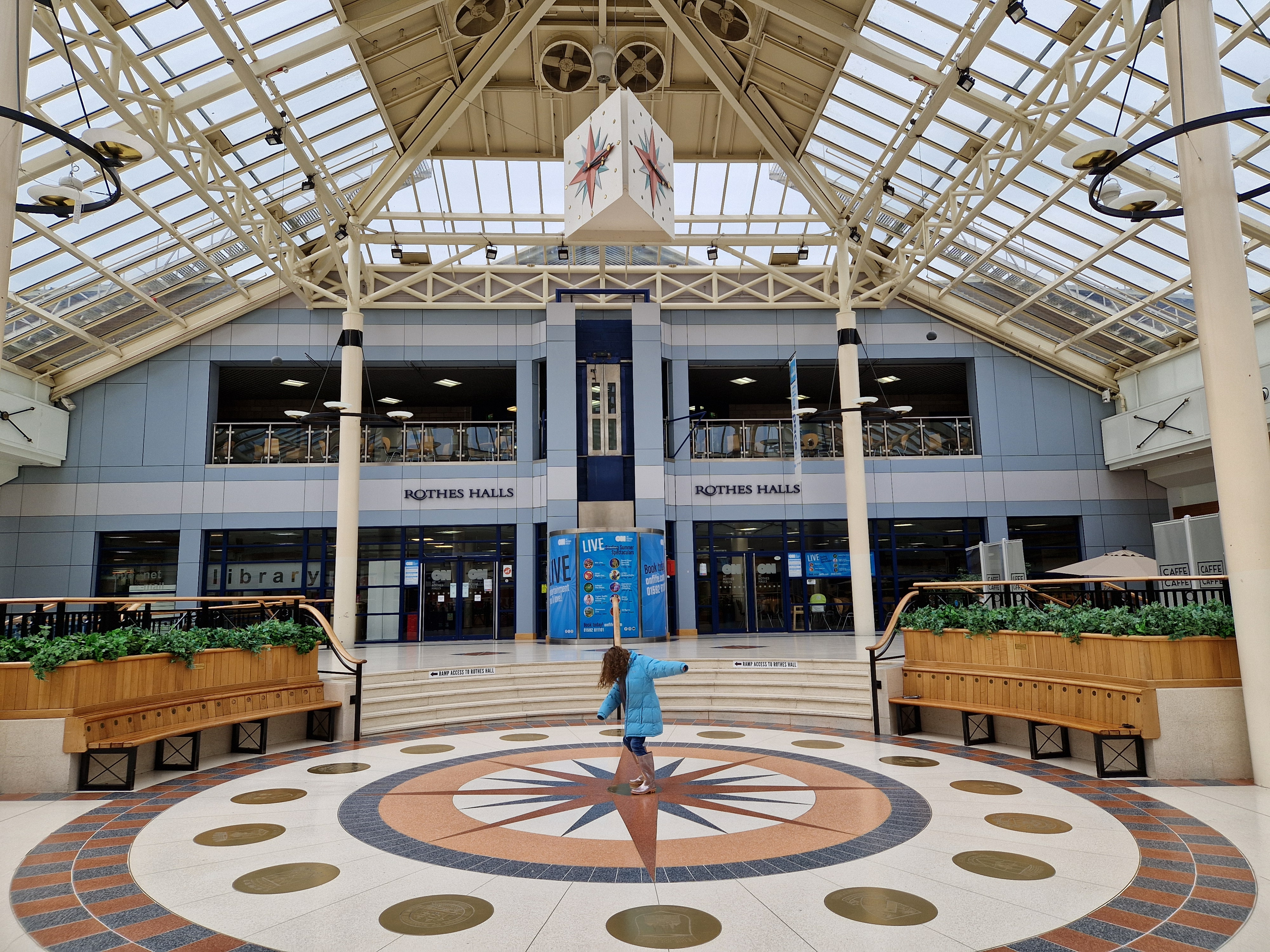
Rothes Halls, Kingdom Centre

Rothes Halls is the town's main theatre, exhibition, conference and civic centre. The town's main library and a cafe also form part of the complex. The Rothes Halls was officially opened by actor and director Richard Wilson on 30 November 1993. Since then it has played host to a vast range of local, national and international shows; popular music and entertainment acts, and amateur societies. It also hosts an annual Kingdom Of Fife Real Ale and Cider Festival, the Glenrothes comic con and a science festival. Some of the exhibits and displays of the former Glenrothes & Area Heritage Centre were relocated into the Rothes Halls after the Heritage Centre closed its unit in the Kingdom Shopping Centre following the COVID-19 pandemic in 2019/2020.

A war memorial was constructed in Glenrothes in 2007 following the deaths of two local Black Watch soldiers in Iraq. Prior to this Glenrothes was in the unusual position of not being able to host its own Remembrance Sunday commemorations. Unlike traditional memorials, the Glenrothes war memorial consists of two interlinking rings of standing stones.

=== Community hospital facilities ===
Glenrothes Hospital is a community hospital located in the Forresters Lodge area to the northwest of the town centre. Opened in October 1981 the hospital has over 80 nursing staff and over 60 beds, as well as around 20 day hospital beds. Glenrothes Hospital provides a wide range of services including; speech and language therapy, occupational therapy, physiotherapy, dietetics, district nurses, health visitors, podiatry, hospital pharmacy and x-ray services. There is, however, no accident and emergency service within this hospital.

=== Social clubs, organisations and community events ===
There are a number of social clubs and organisations operating within Glenrothes which contribute to the cultural and community offerings of the town. These include an art club, various youth clubs, a floral art club, amateur theatre groups, a choral society and a variety of sports clubs. Glenrothes hosts various festival annually across the town. These include the Glenrothes Town Festival, held at Riverside Park with live music, local market stalls, and family activities. WoodFest (Woodside Gala), an annual gala at Carleton Park featuring a big music stage, outdoor bar, food vendors, and fairground rides and the Glenrothes Road Running Festival, a major sporting event featuring a 10k road race, 4k youth race, family 2k fun run, and a junior dash.

Markinch and Thornton each host an annual Highland Games and the other surrounding villages host their own annual gala days and festivals.

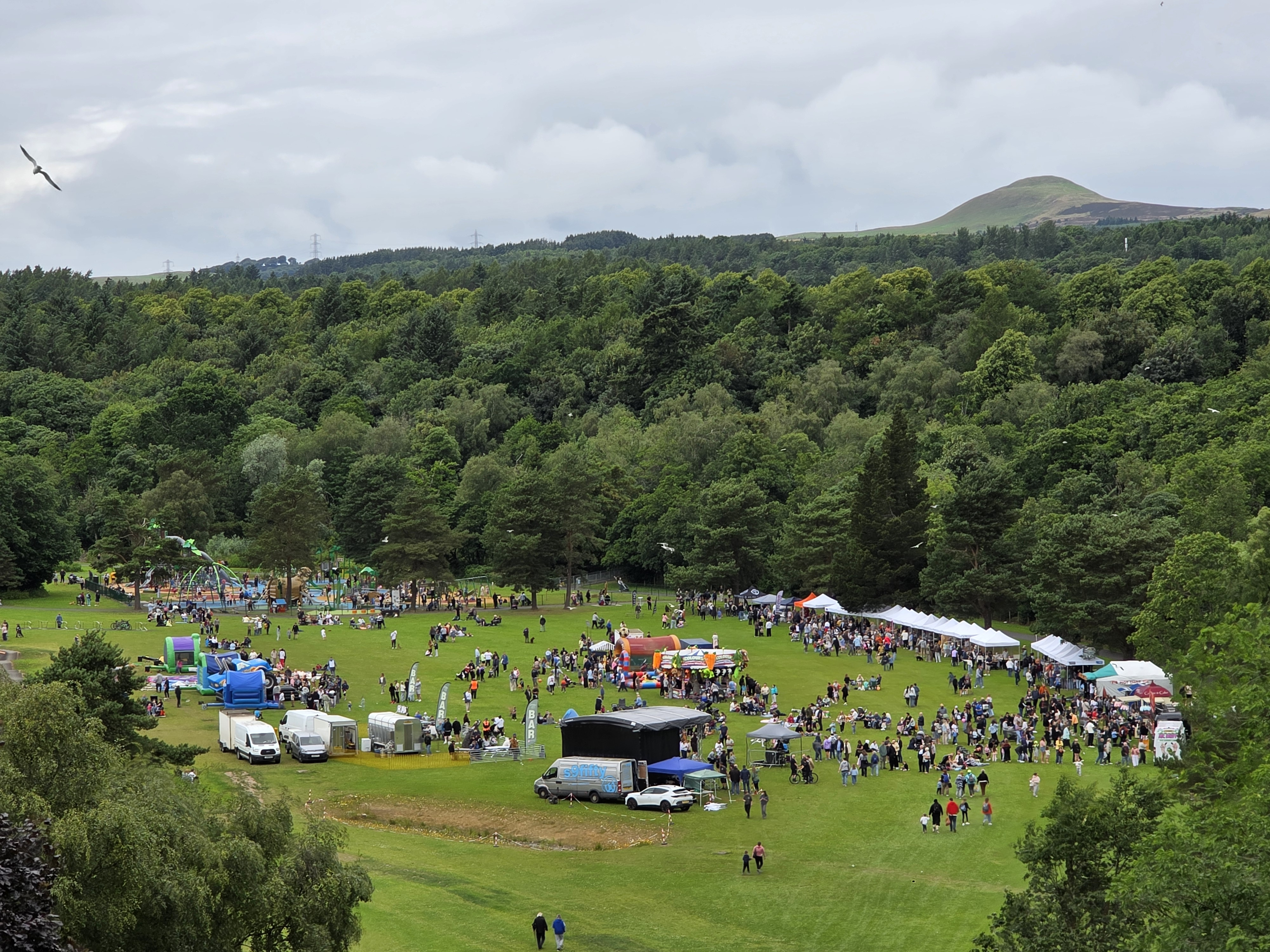
Riverside Park Summer Festival 2026

=== Public parks and horticulture ===
The town has won numerous awards locally and nationally for the quality of its landscaping; something that is promoted by the "Take a Pride in Glenrothes" (TAPIG) group. The Glenrothes Development Corporation devoted around one third of land in Glenrothes to the provision of open space. As a consequence the town has numerous parks, the largest being Balbirnie Park, Carleton Park, Gilvenbank Park, Riverside Park, and Warout Park. The Lomond Hills Regional Park borders and enters the town to the north and east.

The UK Government announced in January 2023 that Glenrothes would share £19.4m of Levelling-up funding. The money was used to deliver major improvements in Riverside Park in 2025. Thus included new electric vehicle charging infrastructure, provision of public toilets and an upgraded multi-functional equipped children's play park with a giant open-mouthed hippo – described as a play sculpture – at the centre. A state-of-the art pump track for mountain bikes, BMX bikes, skateboards and scooters, designed by Clark and Kent Contractors (the company behind the London 2012 Olympic BMX track) was also delivered which is capable of hosting national and international competitions. An 18-hole disc golf course was also created, alongside improvements to the cycle and pedestrian connections to the park including enhanced accessible linkages to the Fife Pilgrim Way were also provided.

=== Sports facilities, clubs and events ===
The town has a large variety of established sports and leisure facilities. This includes two 18-hole golf courses (Glenrothes and Balbirnie), outdoor skateparks, an indoor ten-pin bowling alley, a football stadium at Warout Park, private gyms and the Michael Woods Sports and Leisure Centre which is a major sports complex located in Viewfield. The Sports Centre was named after the late SNP Councillor Michael Woods in a controversial decision taken by the Glenrothes Area Committee in 2012. The sports centre was recognised for its architectural quality in the 2014 Scottish Property Awards, coming second place in the Architectural Excellence Award for Public Buildings. In April 2018 a new state-of-the-art indoor training facility was developed adjacent to the Michael Woods Sports and Leisure Centre; the only facility of its kind in Fife. The indoor arena features a 3G football pitch allowing for seven-a-side and five-a-side matches. The facility, which was funded by Fife Council and sportscotland at a cost of £2.3 million, is also compliant for rugby training.

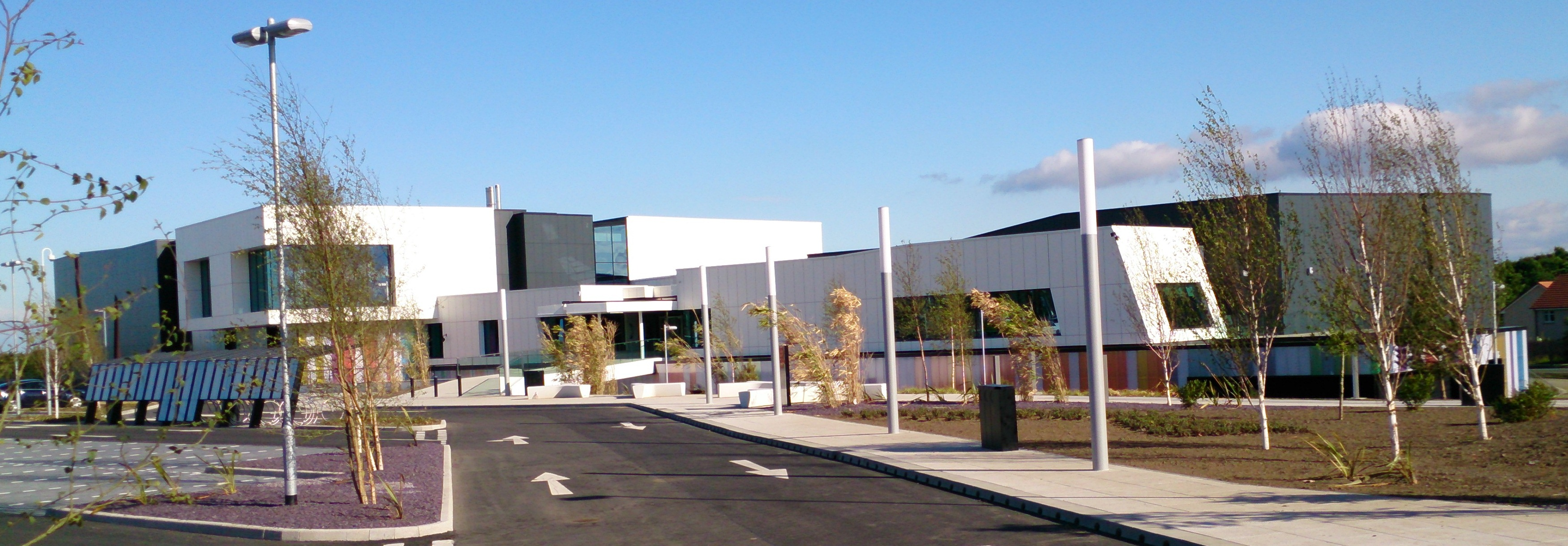
Michael Woods Sports and Leisure Centre

The town's football club is Glenrothes F.C., they compete in the East of Scotland League and play at Warout Stadium. The local rugby club is Glenrothes RFC who are based at Carleton Park and there is also a local cricket club who play at Gilvenbank Park. Team Glen are the local disc golf club who play at the 18 hole course in Riverside Park.

Local sports events include the Road Running Festival in Glenrothes which is the largest annual sporting event in the town with over 1,500 people of all ages and levels of fitness taking part and has been held annually since 1983. The town is also an established destination in hosting the BDO British International Championships for darts which are held annually at the town's CISWO club.

=== Town twinning ===
Glenrothes has a twin-town link with Böblingen, a city in Baden-Württemberg in Germany since 1971. As early as 1962 a local councillor had suggested that the town might "twin" with a town on the Continent. Some years later a friendship grew up between teachers at Glenrothes High School and the Gymnasium in Böblingen which eventually led to the twinning of the towns. Since then there have been a number of exchanges on official, club and personal levels.

=== Notable residents ===
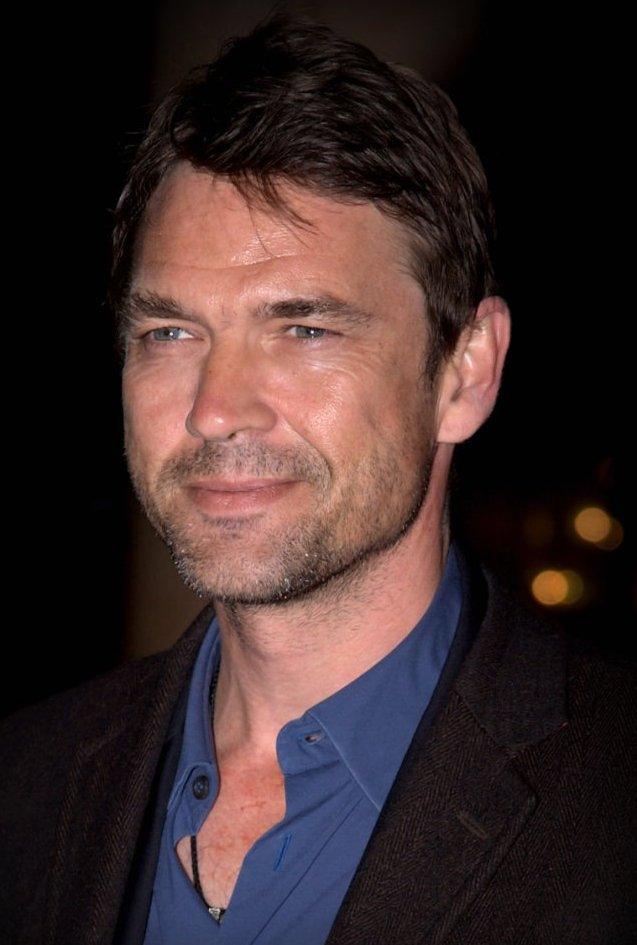
Dougray Scott

- The actor Dougray Scott grew up in Glenrothes and attended Auchmuty High School.
- Douglas Mason, known as one of the engineers of the "Thatcher revolution" and the "father of the poll tax", set up home in Glenrothes in the 1960s and lived most of his adult life there.
- Henry McLeish, the former First Minister of Scotland, lived in Glenrothes, having been brought up in nearby Kennoway. Glenrothes town centre is home to the building involved in the notorious Officegate scandal, which ultimately led to McLeish's resignation as First Minister in 2001.
- Tricia Marwick, the first female Presiding Officer of the Scottish Parliament, served as MSP for Glenrothes.
- John Wallace CBE, moved to Glenrothes in 1955 at the age of six. He began his musical journey in the town's famous Tullis Russell Mills Band, a works band associated with the local paper mill where his father, Christopher Wallace, worked as a joiner. He became the only Scot to hold the position of Principal of the Royal Conservatoire of Scotland between 2002 and 2014.
- The town has also been home to current and former professional football players including Kevin McHattie (Inverness Caledonian Thistle and previously Hearts), Billy MacKay (formerly Rangers and Hearts) and David Speedie (formerly Chelsea, Liverpool).

== Landmarks ==
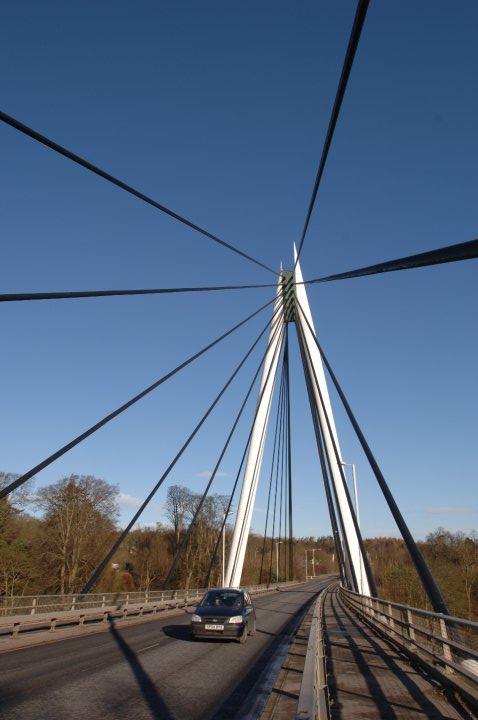
View of River Leven Bridge crossing Riverside Park

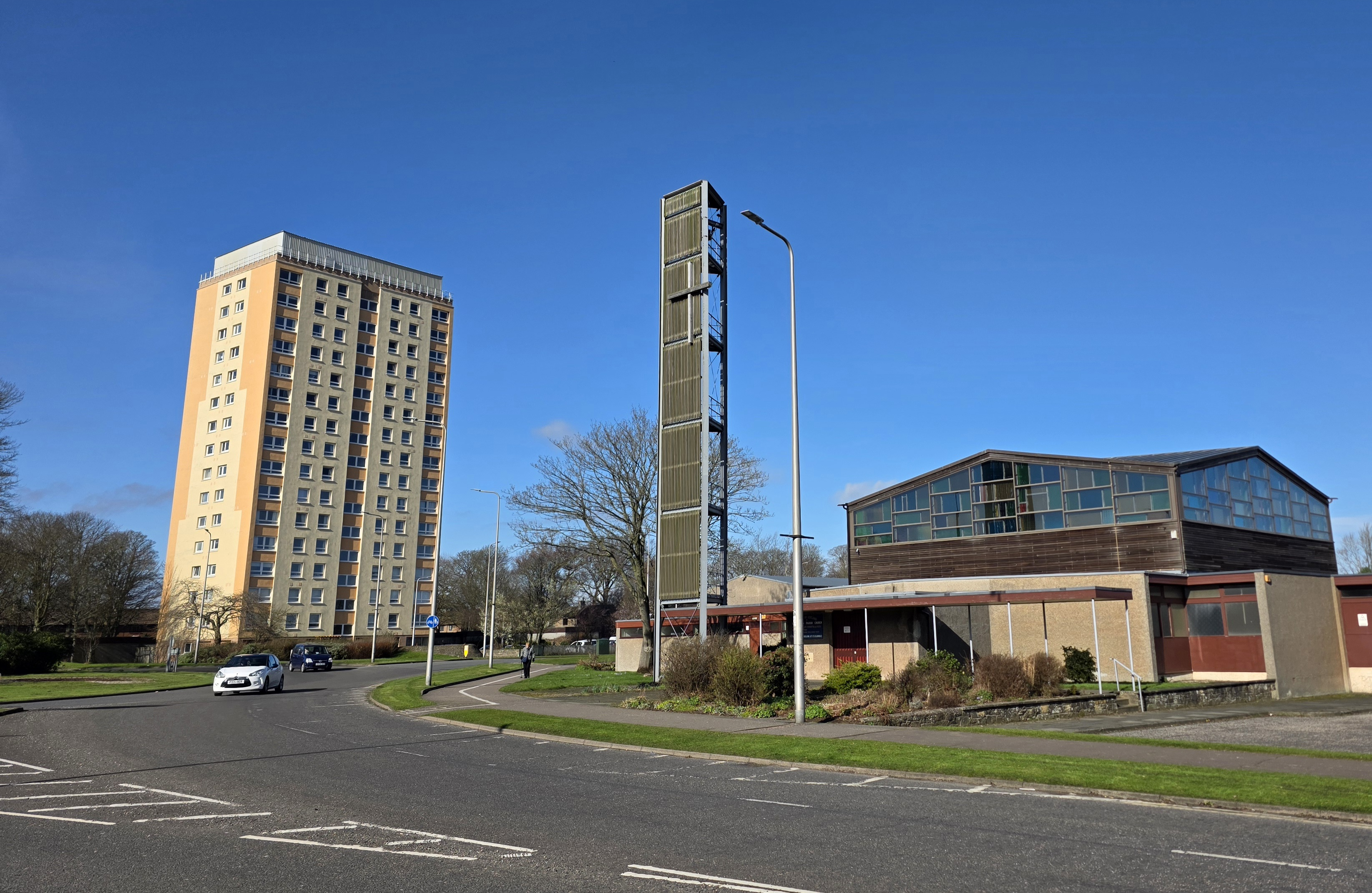
St Columba's Church and Raeburn Heights tower block

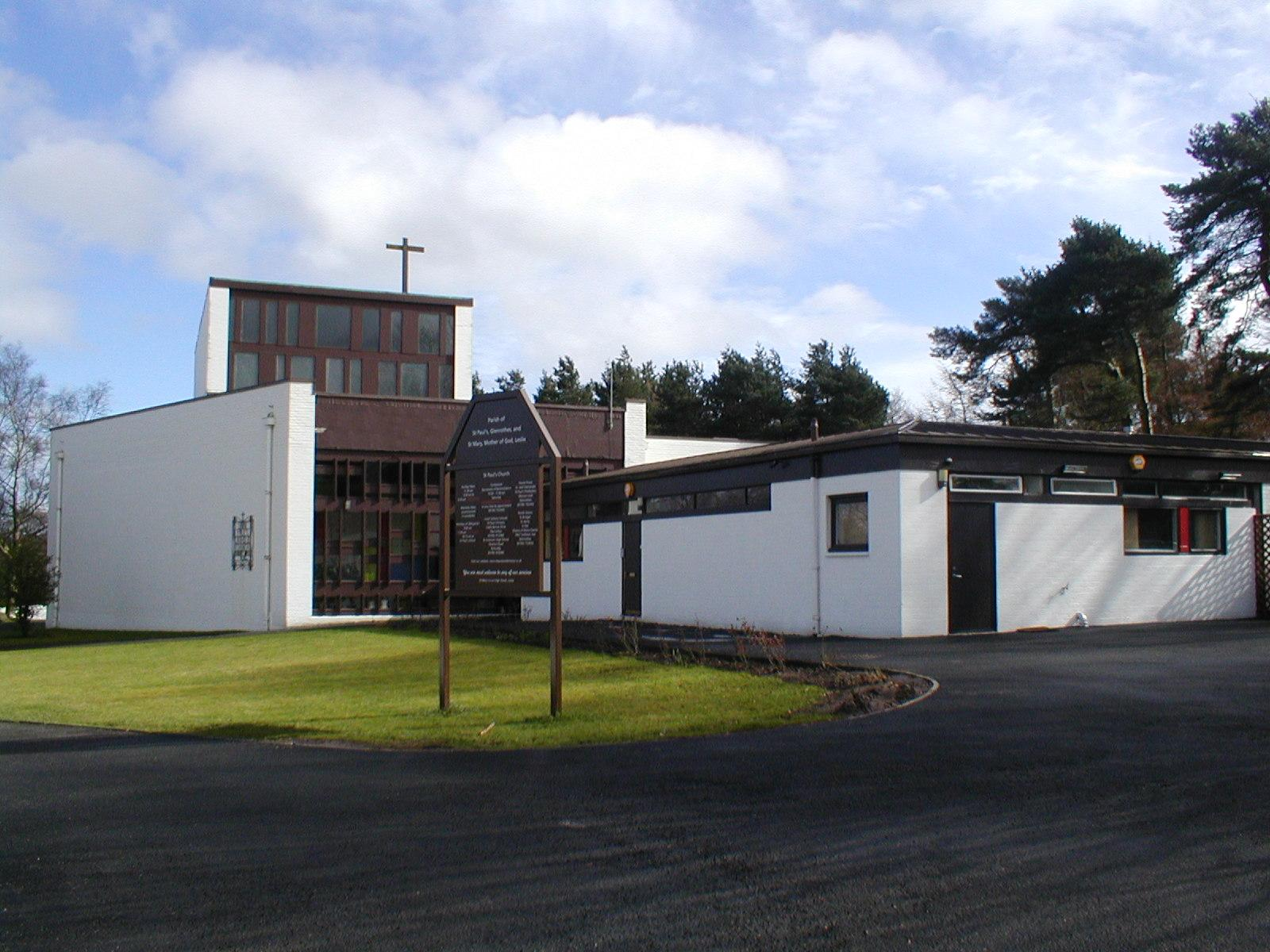
St. Paul's R.C. Church, on the corner of Woodside Road and Warout Road

The River Leven Bridge, also known locally as the 'White Bridge', which spans Riverside Park and carries the town's Western Distributor Road, is a cable-stayed bridge that was completed in 1995. The bridge was designed by Dundee-based Nicoll Russell Studios, Architects and was commissioned by the Glenrothes Development Corporation (GDC) as a landmark creating a gateway into Riverside Park that could be seen from further afield. The bridge was constructed by Balfour Beatty Construction (Scotland) and it was the first reinforced-concrete cable-stayed structure ever built in the UK.

A number of Glenrothes' artworks and sculptures act as landmarks at major gateways into the town, such as the "Giant Irises" at Leslie Roundabout, and the Glenrothes "Gateway Totum" at Bankhead Roundabout. A number of other sculptures were relocated in 2011 to more visually prominent locations around the town creating new landmarks.

The town is also home to a number of churches which act as important landmarks due to their unique architectural styles and sometimes their locations at key road junctions. The three earliest churches are now listed buildings. These are St. Margaret's Church in Woodside (category C listed), St. Paul's RC Church in Auchmuty (category A listed), and St. Columba's Church on Church Street (category A listed) in the town centre. St. Paul's RC was designed by architects Gillespie, Kidd and Coia. In 1993 it was listed as one of sixty key monuments of post-war architecture by the international conservation organisation DoCoMoMo. The church sits at a junction between two main distributor roads. St Columba's Church, designed by architects Wheeler & Sproson, underwent significant restoration in 2009. Internally the church contains a large mural created by Alberto Morrocco titled 'The Way of the Cross', which was completed in 1962. Externally the church with its distinctive triangular iron bell tower and Mondrian inspired stained glass windows acts as a landmark at the south-western gateway to the town centre close to the town's only residential tower block, Raeburn Heights.

Balgonie Castle located to the east of Glenrothes on the south bank of the River Leven near Milton of Balgonie and Coaltown of Balgonie is a local landmark on the eastern approach to Glenrothes from Levenmouth. The castle keep dates from the 14th century and has been recently restored. The castle was awarded category A listing in 1972 by Historic Scotland.

== Education ==
=== Primary schools ===
Early precincts in the town were served by their own primary schools which were to be provided on the basis of one school for every 1,000 houses. The first primary school to be opened in Glenrothes was Carleton Primary School, built in 1953 in Woodside. In total thirteen primary schools were developed in the town, twelve non-denominational and one to serve catholic pupils. In February 2014 Fife Council's executive committee voted to close one of Glenrothes' primary schools at Tanshall as part of a wider school estate review which sought to reduce costs. The closure faced considerable local opposition and the proposals were called-in by the Scottish Government, but ultimately the closure of the school went ahead as planned and Tanshall Primary School was demolished in 2016.

=== Secondary schools ===
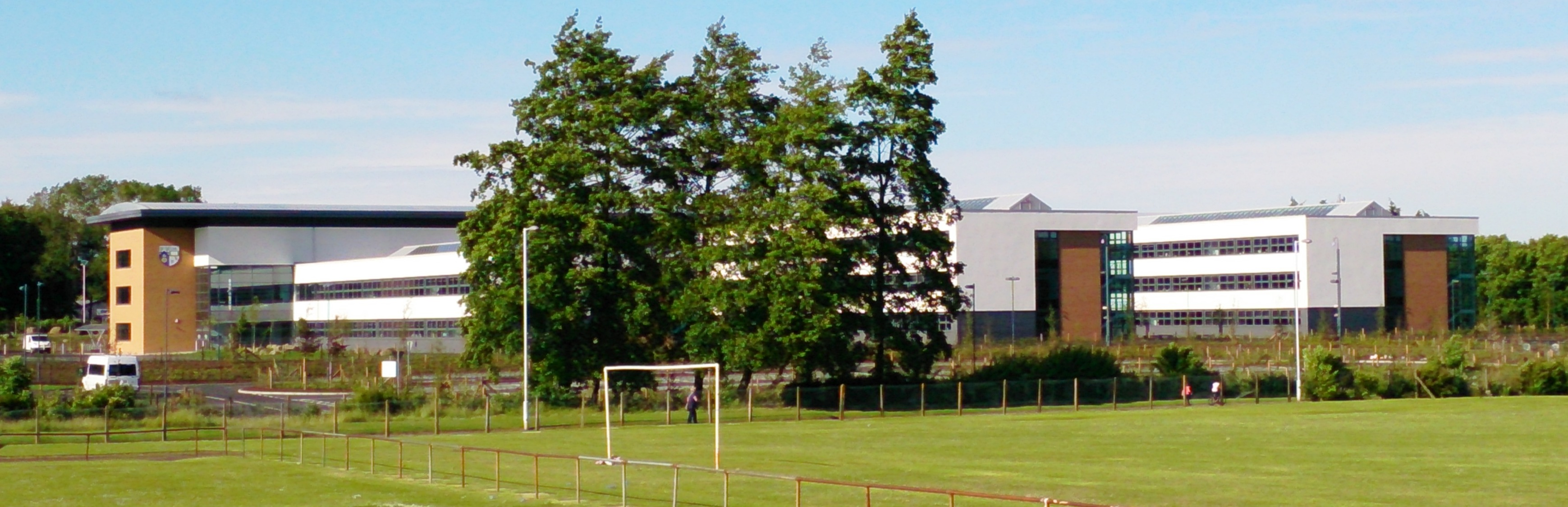
The new Auchmuty High School completed summer 2013

Secondary Schools were originally to be provided on the basis of one school for every 4,000 houses. Three secondary schools were constructed in Glenrothes, the earliest Auchmuty High School opened in 1957 serving the eastern area of the new town. Glenwood High School was the second secondary to be built in 1962 serving the newer western precincts as the town expanded during that period. Prior to 1966 older pupils had to attend schools in neighbouring towns to continue "Higher" examinations as Auchmuty and Glenwood only provided for pupils at junior secondary level. Glenrothes High School was built in 1966 to accommodate pupils at a higher level. However, changes in the education system nationally meant that both Auchmuty and Glenwood were extended and raised to full high school status in the 1970s. Auchmuty High School serves the east and southern parts of Glenrothes as well as the villages of Markinch, Coaltown of Balgonie and Thornton. As part of the £126 million Building Fife's Future Project a replacement for Auchmuty was completed and opened to pupils in 2013. Glenrothes High School serves the central and northern areas in the town. Glenwood High School serves the western parts of Glenrothes and the villages of Leslie and Kinglassie. Catholic pupils in Glenrothes attend St Andrew's High School in neighbouring Kirkcaldy.

=== Further education ===
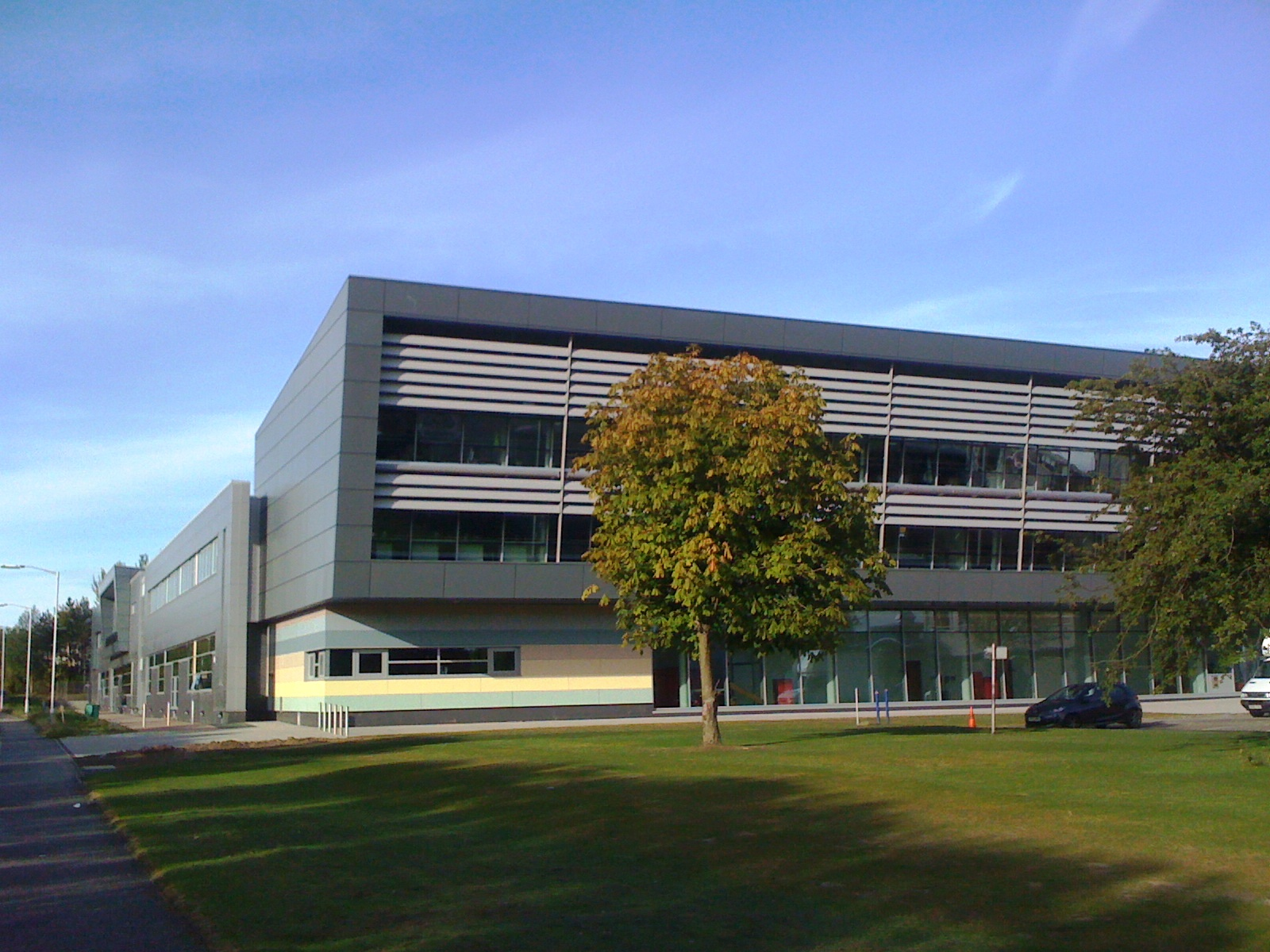
Fife College Glenrothes Campus

Further education in the town is provided at Fife College. Construction of a Glenrothes college campus began in the early 1970s, originally specialising in paper manufacturing, mechanical engineering and electrical engineering courses. A second institute known as FIPRE (Fife Institute of Physical and Recreational Education) was built adjacent catering for sport and physical education as well as providing a sports centre for the town. The Glenrothes campus of the college is located at Stenton Road in Viewfield. This was significantly extended in 2010 with the development of the "Future Skills Centre". The core course specialisms at Fife College's Glenrothes campus focus primarily on creative media, healthcare, social care, early years education, engineering, science, construction, art and design.

== Transport and Connections ==
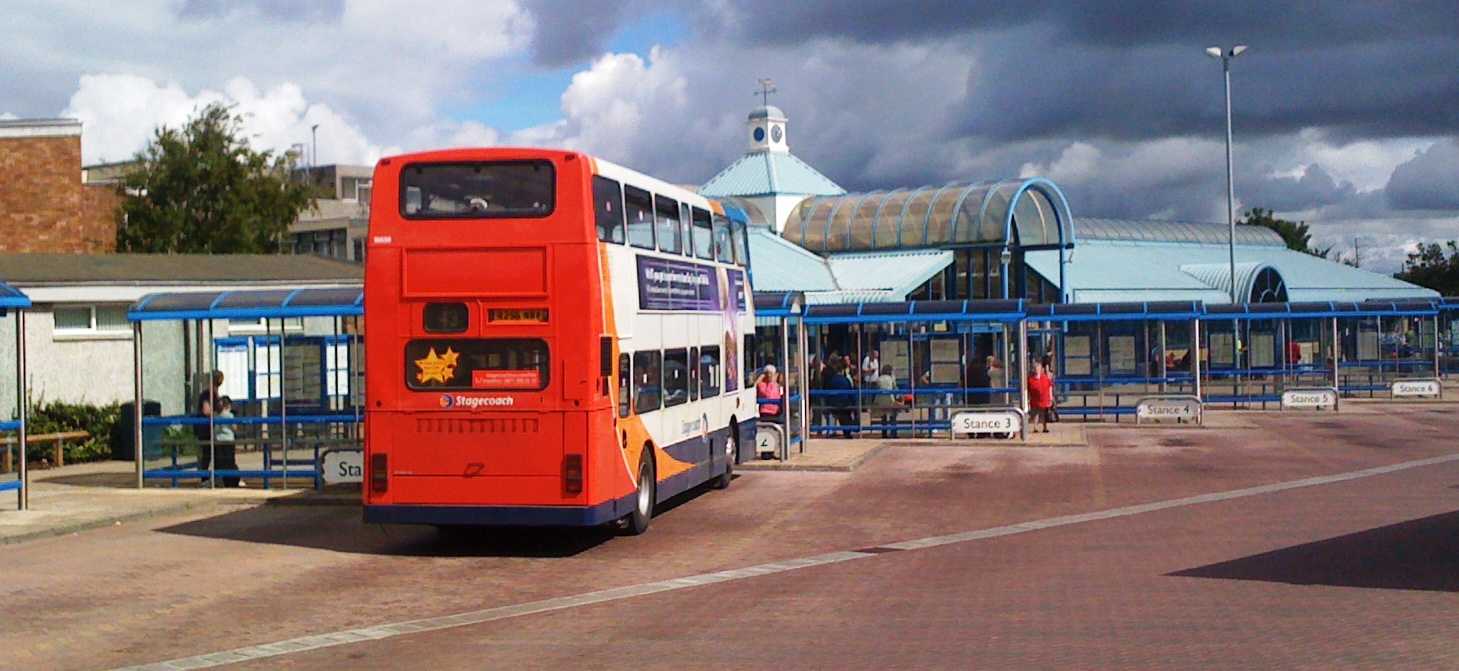
Glenrothes Bus Station

Markinch rail station

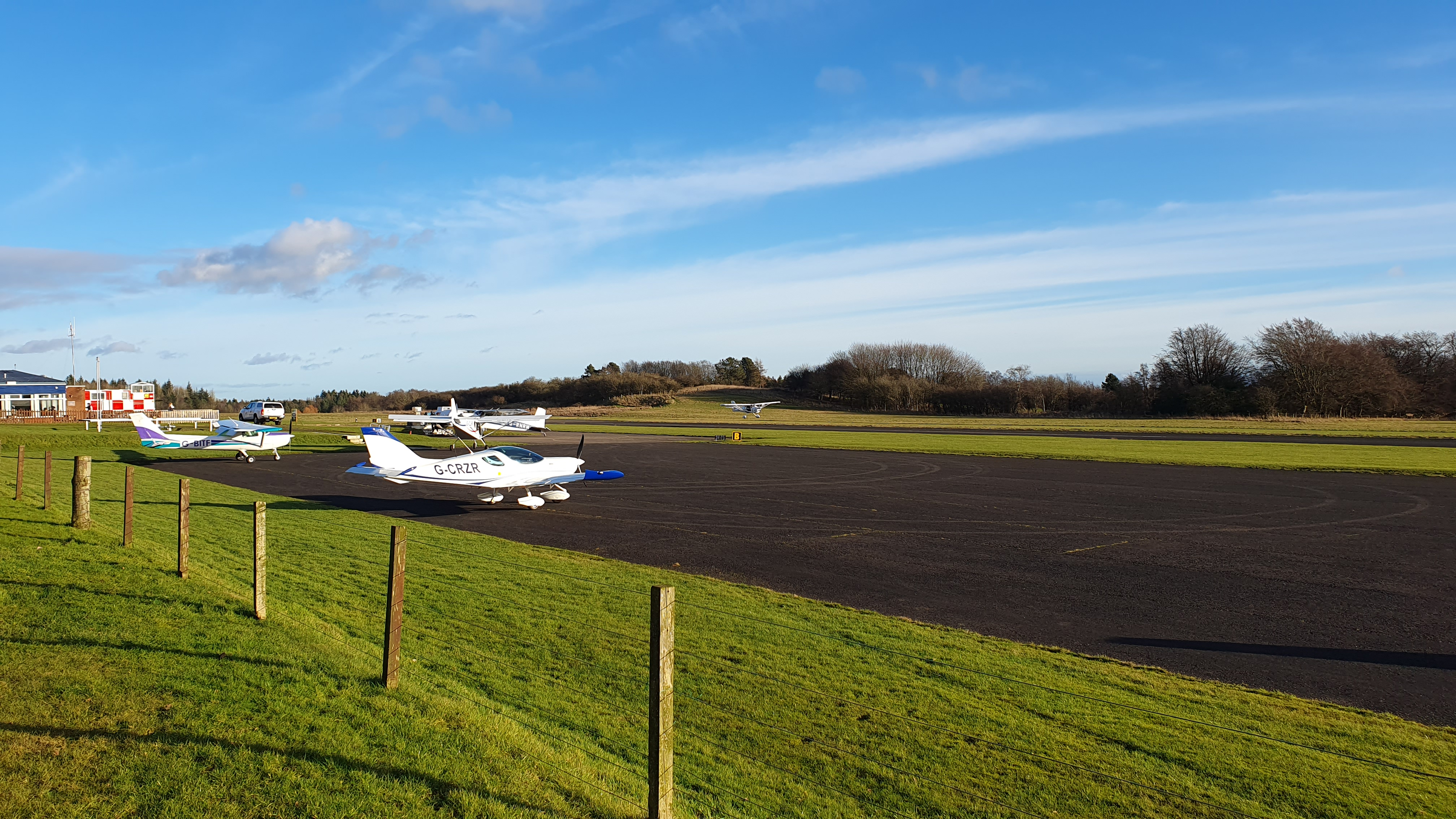
Fife (Glenrothes) Airport

Glenrothes has a planned road network with original masterplans establishing the principle that "through traffic" be bypassed around the housing precincts by a network of "Freeway" and "Highway" distributor roads. These would connect each precinct to the purposely designed town centre and to the industrial estates. Another element that was adopted was the use of roundabouts at junctions instead of traffic lights which would allow traffic to flow freely.

The town has direct dual-carriageway access to the M90 via the A92 Trunk Road. The A92 passes north–south through the town and connects Glenrothes with Dundee in the north and Dunfermline in the southwest where it merges with the M90. This gives Glenrothes a continuous dual-carriageway link to Edinburgh and the major central Scotland road networks, whilst much of the route north to Dundee remains a single-carriageway. Local campaigners have for a number of years sought the upgrade of the A92 north of Glenrothes.

The A911 road passes east/west through the town and connects it with Levenmouth in the east and Milnathort and the M90 in the west. The B921 Kinglassie Road, described in early masterplans as the Southern Freeway, links Glenrothes to the former mining communities of Cardenden and Kinglassie, and to Westfield. The route is a dual carriageway between Bankhead Roundabout and as far west as Fife Airport. Early masterplans show that this route was originally intended to be upgraded to provide dualled connections to the A92 Chapel junction in Kirkcaldy, however this was never implemented.

The town has a major bus station in the town centre providing frequent links to the cities of Dundee, Edinburgh, Glasgow and Perth as well as to surrounding towns and villages.

Glenrothes lies adjacent to the Edinburgh–Dundee line and the Fife Circle rail line. Two railway stations on the edge of the main town serve the Glenrothes area - Markinch railway station and Thornton railway station. Upon designation of the new town in the 1940s branch lines operated from Markinch, connecting to Leslie and to the Tullis Russell papermill passing through the new town area. The Leslie branch line closed in 1967 as part of the Beeching cuts and later became Boblingen Way, a pedestrian and cycle route. The Tullis Russell (Auchmuty Mill) branch line closed in 1992 with the majority converted as a pedestrian and cycle route.

Glenrothes is home to an airfield, Fife Airport (ICAO code EGPJ), which is used for general aviation with private light aircraft. Edinburgh Airport is the nearest international airport to Glenrothes and Dundee Airport operates daily flights to London, Belfast and Shetland.

Lady's Walk

A purposely designed pedestrian and cycle system was also created using a network of ring and radial routes throughout the town. This includes a near three mile continuous linear cycle path, called Boblingen Way, which extends across the length of Glenrothes, from Leslie in the west, to Woodside in the east.

Glenrothes is connected to the National Cycle Network via Route 766 which runs north from Kirkcaldy to north of Glenrothes, linking to the wider network via Route 76 and Route 1. The Fife Pilgrim Way is a long-distance walking route covering a distance of around 64 miles between Culross, connecting a number of Fife's villages, towns and countryside and terminating in St Andrews. The route passes through Glenrothes on a section of the route between Kinglassie in the southwest and Markinch in the east.
