= List of United Kingdom locations: Ma-Maq =

The United Kingdom

This is part of the list of United Kingdom locations: a gazetteer of place names in the United Kingdom showing each place's locality and geographical coordinates.

== Ma ==
=== Maa-Mad ===
Location	Locality	Coordinates (links to map & photo sources)	OS grid reference
Mabe Burnthouse	Cornwall	50.16°N 05.13°W	SW7634
Mabledon	Kent	51.17°N 00.24°E	TQ5744
Mablethorpe	Lincolnshire	53.34°N 00.25°E	TF5085
Macclesfield	Cheshire	53.25°N 02.13°W	SJ9173
Macclesfield Forest	Cheshire	53.24°N 02.04°W	SJ9772
Macduff	Aberdeenshire	57.66°N 02.50°W	NJ7064
Macedonia	Fife	56.19°N 03.21°W	NO2501
Mace Green	Suffolk	52.02°N 01.06°E	TM1041
Machan	South Lanarkshire	55.72°N 03.97°W	NS7650
Machen	Caerphilly	51.59°N 03.14°W	ST2189
Machrie	North Ayrshire	55.55°N 05.34°W	NR8934
Machrihanish	Argyll and Bute	55.41°N 05.74°W	NR6320
Machroes	Gwynedd	52.80°N 04.50°W	SH3126
Machynlleth	Powys	52.58°N 03.86°W	SH7400
Machynys	Carmarthenshire	51.66°N 04.15°W	SS5198
Mackerel's Common	West Sussex	51.04°N 00.56°W	TQ0128
Mackerye End	Hertfordshire	51.82°N 00.33°W	TL1515
Mackham	Devon	50.87°N 03.20°W	ST1509
Mackney	Oxfordshire	51.59°N 01.17°W	SU5789
Mackside	Scottish Borders	55.38°N 02.63°W	NT6010
Mackworth	City of Derby	52.92°N 01.52°W	SK3236
Mackworth	Derbyshire	52.92°N 01.54°W	SK3137
Macmerry	East Lothian	55.93°N 02.91°W	NT4372
Madderty	Perth and Kinross	56.37°N 03.70°W	NN9521
Maddington	Wiltshire	51.19°N 01.91°W	SU0644
Maddiston	Falkirk	55.96°N 03.69°W	NS9476
Maddox Moor	Pembrokeshire	51.76°N 04.95°W	SM9611
Madehurst	West Sussex	50.88°N 00.60°W	SU9810
Madeley	Shropshire	52.63°N 02.45°W	SJ6904
Madeley	Staffordshire	52.99°N 02.34°W	SJ7744
Madeley Heath	Staffordshire	53.00°N 02.32°W	SJ7845
Madeley Heath	Worcestershire	52.39°N 02.07°W	SO9577
Maders	Cornwall	50.51°N 04.34°W	SX3471
Madford	Devon	50.89°N 03.22°W	ST1411
Madingley	Cambridgeshire	52.22°N 00.03°E	TL3960
Madjeston	Dorset	51.02°N 02.28°W	ST8025
Madley	Herefordshire	52.03°N 02.86°W	SO4138
Madresfield	Worcestershire	52.12°N 02.29°W	SO8047
Madron	Cornwall	50.12°N 05.56°W	SW4531

=== Mae ===
Location	Locality	Coordinates (links to map & photo sources)	OS grid reference
Maenaddwyn	Isle of Anglesey	53.33°N 04.32°W	SH4584
Maenclochog	Pembrokeshire	51.90°N 04.79°W	SN0827
Maendy	The Vale Of Glamorgan	51.47°N 03.42°W	ST0176
Maenporth	Cornwall	50.11°N 05.09°W	SW7929
Maentwrog	Gwynedd	52.94°N 03.99°W	SH6640
Maen-y-groes	Ceredigion	52.19°N 04.37°W	SN3858
Maer	Cornwall	50.83°N 04.55°W	SS2007
Maer	Staffordshire	52.93°N 02.31°W	SJ7938
Maerdy	Carmarthenshire	51.86°N 04.00°W	SN6220
Maerdy	Conwy	52.98°N 03.47°W	SJ0144
Maerdy	Rhondda, Cynon, Taff	51.67°N 03.49°W	SS9798
Maes-bangor	Ceredigion	52.40°N 03.97°W	SN6680
Maesbrook	Shropshire	52.78°N 03.03°W	SJ3021
Maesbury	Shropshire	52.81°N 03.04°W	SJ3025
Maesbury Marsh	Shropshire	52.81°N 03.02°W	SJ3125
Maesgeirchen	Gwynedd	53.21°N 04.12°W	SH5871
Maes-glas	Flintshire	53.28°N 03.21°W	SJ1977
Maesglas	City of Newport	51.55°N 03.02°W	ST2985
Maesgwynne	Carmarthenshire	51.87°N 04.61°W	SN2023
Maeshafn	Denbighshire	53.13°N 03.19°W	SJ2060
Maes llyn	Ceredigion	52.07°N 04.39°W	SN3644
Maesmynis	Powys	52.11°N 03.44°W	SO0147
Maes Pennant	Flintshire	53.30°N 03.26°W	SJ1679
Maesteg	Bridgend	51.60°N 03.66°W	SS8591
Maesybont	Carmarthenshire	51.82°N 04.09°W	SN5616
Maesycoed	Rhondda, Cynon, Taff	51.59°N 03.35°W	ST0689
Maesycwmmer	Caerphilly	51.63°N 03.22°W	ST1594
Maes-y-dre	Flintshire	53.16°N 03.15°W	SJ2364
Maesygwartha	Monmouthshire	51.81°N 03.11°W	SO2314
Maesypandy	Powys	52.54°N 03.49°W	SN9995
Maesyrhandir	Powys	52.50°N 03.34°W	SO0990

=== Mag-Mai ===
Location	Locality	Coordinates (links to map & photo sources)	OS grid reference
Magdalen Laver	Essex	51.75°N 00.18°E	TL5108
Maggieknockater	Moray	57.49°N 03.15°W	NJ3145
Maggots End	Essex	51.92°N 00.15°E	TL4827
Magham Down	East Sussex	50.87°N 00.27°E	TQ6011
Maghull	Sefton	53.51°N 02.95°W	SD3702
Magor	Monmouthshire	51.57°N 02.83°W	ST4287
Magpie Green	Suffolk	52.36°N 01.03°E	TM0778
Maida Vale	City of Westminster	51.52°N 00.19°W	TQ2582
Maidenbower	West Sussex	51.09°N 00.15°W	TQ2935
Maiden Bradley	Wiltshire	51.14°N 02.28°W	ST8038
Maidencombe	Devon	50.50°N 03.52°W	SX9268
Maidenhall	Suffolk	52.03°N 01.13°E	TM1542
Maidenhayne	Devon	50.75°N 03.03°W	SY2795
Maidenhead	Berkshire	51.52°N 00.74°W	SU8781
Maiden Head	North Somerset	51.39°N 02.63°W	ST5666
Maidenhead Court	Berkshire	51.53°N 00.70°W	SU9083
Maiden Law	Durham	54.83°N 01.73°W	NZ1749
Maiden Newton	Dorset	50.77°N 02.58°W	SY5997
Maidenpark	Falkirk	56.00°N 03.62°W	NS9980
Maidens	South Ayrshire	55.32°N 04.82°W	NS2107
Maidensgrave	Suffolk	52.08°N 01.29°E	TM2648
Maiden's Green	Berkshire	51.44°N 00.72°W	SU8972
Maidensgrove	Oxfordshire	51.58°N 00.96°W	SU7288
Maiden's Hall	Northumberland	55.27°N 01.63°W	NZ2398
Maidenwell	Lincolnshire	53.29°N 00.02°W	TF3279
Maiden Wells	Pembrokeshire	51.65°N 04.93°W	SR9799
Maidford	Northamptonshire	52.16°N 01.12°W	SP6052
Maids Moreton	Buckinghamshire	52.00°N 00.98°W	SP7035
Maidstone	Kent	51.26°N 00.53°E	TQ7655
Maidwell	Northamptonshire	52.37°N 00.91°W	SP7476
Mail	Shetland Islands	60.03°N 01.24°W	HU4228
Mailand	Shetland Islands	60.68°N 00.90°W	HP6001
Mailingsland	Scottish Borders	55.67°N 03.21°W	NT2443
Maindee	City of Newport	51.58°N 02.98°W	ST3288
Maindy	Cardiff	51.49°N 03.19°W	ST1778
Mainholm	South Ayrshire	55.45°N 04.57°W	NS3721
Mainland	Orkney Islands	58.98°N 03.07°W	HY385117
Mainland	Shetland Islands	60.27°N 01.30°W	HU387541
Mains	Cumbria	54.60°N 03.44°W	NY0724
Mainsforth	Durham	54.67°N 01.52°W	NZ3131
Mains of Ardestie	Angus	56.49°N 02.81°W	NO5034
Mains of Balgavies	Angus	56.64°N 02.76°W	NO5351
Mains of Grandhome	City of Aberdeen	57.19°N 02.18°W	NJ8912
Mains of Gray	City of Dundee	56.47°N 03.08°W	NO3332
Mains of Melgund	Angus	56.69°N 02.75°W	NO5456
Mains of Orchil	Perth and Kinross	56.75°N 03.80°W	NN9064
Mains of Usan	Angus	56.68°N 02.45°W	NO7255
Mainsriddle	Dumfries and Galloway	54.88°N 03.65°W	NX9456
Mainstone	Shropshire	52.47°N 03.07°W	SO2787
Maisemore	Gloucestershire	51.88°N 02.27°W	SO8121
Maitland Park	Camden	51.54°N 00.15°W	TQ2884

=== Maj-Mam ===
Location	Locality	Coordinates (links to map & photo sources)	OS grid reference
Major's Green	Worcestershire	52.39°N 01.85°W	SP1077
Makeney	Derbyshire	52.99°N 01.47°W	SK3544
Malacleit	Western Isles	57.64°N 07.38°W	NF7974
Malborough	Devon	50.23°N 03.82°W	SX7039
Malcoff	Derbyshire	53.33°N 01.89°W	SK0782
Malcolms Head	Shetland Islands	59.51°N 01.65°W	HZ197703
Malcolm's Point	Argyll and Bute	56.29°N 06.05°W	NM492186
Malden Rushett	Kingston upon Thames	51.33°N 00.32°W	TQ1761
Maldon	Essex	51.73°N 00.66°E	TL8407
Malehurst	Shropshire	52.64°N 02.91°W	SJ3806
Malham	North Yorkshire	54.05°N 02.15°W	SD9062
Maligar	Highland	57.59°N 06.21°W	NG4864
Malin Bridge	Sheffield	53.39°N 01.52°W	SK3289
Malinslee	Shropshire	52.66°N 02.45°W	SJ6908
Malkin's Bank	Cheshire	53.12°N 02.36°W	SJ7659
Mallaig	Highland	56.99°N 05.83°W	NM6796
Mallaigmore	Highland	57.00°N 05.80°W	NM6997
Malleny Mills	City of Edinburgh	55.87°N 03.34°W	NT1665
Mallows Green	Essex	51.91°N 00.13°E	TL4726
Malltraeth	Isle of Anglesey	53.18°N 04.39°W	SH4068
Mallwyd	Gwynedd	52.69°N 03.68°W	SH8612
Malmesbury	Wiltshire	51.58°N 02.10°W	ST9387
Malmsmead	Devon	51.20°N 03.73°W	SS7947
Malpas	Berkshire	51.44°N 01.09°W	SU6372
Malpas	Cheshire	53.01°N 02.77°W	SJ4847
Malpas	Cornwall	50.23°N 05.03°W	SW8442
Malpas	City of Newport	51.60°N 03.01°W	ST3090
Malswick	Gloucestershire	51.92°N 02.37°W	SO7425
Maltby	Lincolnshire	53.33°N 00.03°W	TF3184
Maltby	Rotherham	53.42°N 01.21°W	SK5292
Maltby	Stockton-on-Tees	54.51°N 01.29°W	NZ4613
Maltby le Marsh	Lincolnshire	53.30°N 00.18°E	TF4681
Malting End	Suffolk	52.15°N 00.54°E	TL7454
Maltman's Hill	Kent	51.15°N 00.71°E	TQ9043
Malton	North Yorkshire	54.12°N 00.80°W	SE7871
Malvern Common	Worcestershire	52.09°N 02.32°W	SO7844
Malvern Link	Worcestershire	52.12°N 02.32°W	SO7847
Malvern Wells	Worcestershire	52.07°N 02.33°W	SO7742
Mambeg	Argyll and Bute	56.06°N 04.84°W	NS2389
Mamble	Worcestershire	52.33°N 02.47°W	SO6871
Mamhilad	Monmouthshire	51.72°N 03.01°W	SO3003

=== Man-Maq ===
Location	Locality	Coordinates (links to map & photo sources)	OS grid reference
Manaccan	Cornwall	50.08°N 05.13°W	SW7625
Manacle Point	Cornwall	50.05°N 05.06°W	SW810214
Manadon	Devon	50.40°N 04.15°W	SX4758
Manafon	Powys	52.60°N 03.31°W	SJ1102
Mànais or Manish	Western Isles	57.79°N 06.88°W	NG1089
Manaton	Devon	50.61°N 03.76°W	SX7581
Manby	Lincolnshire	53.35°N 00.08°E	TF3986
Mancetter	Warwickshire	52.56°N 01.54°W	SP3196
Manchester	Greater Manchester	53.47°N 02.25°W	SJ8398
Mancot Royal	Flintshire	53.18°N 03.01°W	SJ3266
Manea	Cambridgeshire	52.47°N 00.17°E	TL4889
Maney	Birmingham	52.55°N 01.82°W	SP1295
Manfield	North Yorkshire	54.51°N 01.66°W	NZ2213
Mangaster	Shetland Islands	60.41°N 01.42°W	HU3270
Mangersta	Western Isles	58.16°N 07.10°W	NB0031
Mangerton	Dorset	50.75°N 02.73°W	SY4895
Mangotsfield	South Gloucestershire	51.48°N 02.50°W	ST6576
Mangrove Green	Hertfordshire	51.89°N 00.37°W	TL1223
Manhay	Cornwall	50.12°N 05.23°W	SW6930
Manian-fawr	Ceredigion	52.09°N 04.70°W	SN1547
Mankinholes	Calderdale	53.70°N 02.06°W	SD9623
Manley	Cheshire	53.23°N 02.75°W	SJ5071
Manley	Devon	50.88°N 03.45°W	SS9811
Manley Common	Cheshire	53.24°N 02.72°W	SJ5272
Manmoel	Caerphilly	51.71°N 03.20°W	SO1703
Mannal	Argyll and Bute	56.45°N 06.90°W	NL9840
Mannamead	Devon	50.38°N 04.13°W	SX4856
Mannerston	West Lothian	55.98°N 03.54°W	NT0478
Manningford Abbots	Wiltshire	51.32°N 01.80°W	SU1458
Manningford Bohune	Wiltshire	51.31°N 01.81°W	SU1357
Manningford Bruce	Wiltshire	51.32°N 01.81°W	SU1358
Manningham	Bradford	53.80°N 01.77°W	SE1534
Mannings Heath (Dorset)	Dorset		
Mannings Heath (West Sussex)	West Sussex	51.03°N 00.28°W	TQ2028
Mannington	Dorset	50.84°N 01.91°W	SU0605
Manningtree	Essex	51.93°N 01.05°E	TM1031
Mannofield	City of Aberdeen	57.12°N 02.15°W	NJ9104
Manorbier	Pembrokeshire	51.63°N 04.80°W	SS0697
Manorbier Newton	Pembrokeshire	51.65°N 04.83°W	SS0499
Manor Bourne	Devon	50.32°N 04.12°W	SX4949
Manordeilo	Carmarthenshire	51.91°N 03.94°W	SN6626
Manor Estate	Sheffield	53.36°N 01.43°W	SK3885
Manorhill	Scottish Borders	55.58°N 02.54°W	NT6632
Manor Hill Corner	Lincolnshire	52.73°N 00.07°E	TF4017
Manor House	Coventry	52.43°N 01.47°W	SP3682
Manorowen	Pembrokeshire	51.98°N 05.01°W	SM9336
Manor Park	Berkshire	51.51°N 00.61°W	SU9681
Manor Park	Bradford	53.91°N 01.77°W	SE1547
Manor Park	Buckinghamshire	51.81°N 00.81°W	SP8214
Manor Park	Cheshire	53.18°N 02.46°W	SJ6965
Manor Park	East Sussex	50.96°N 00.09°E	TQ4721
Manor Park	Newham	51.54°N 00.04°E	TQ4285
Manor Park	Nottinghamshire	52.89°N 01.15°W	SK5733
Manor Park	Sheffield	53.36°N 01.44°W	SK3786
Manor Parsley	Cornwall	50.26°N 05.22°W	SW7046
Manor Royal	West Sussex	51.12°N 00.20°W	TQ2638
Man's Cross	Essex	52.01°N 00.54°E	TL7538
Mansegate	Dumfries and Galloway	55.12°N 03.77°W	NX8783
Manselfield	Swansea	51.57°N 04.03°W	SS5988
Mansell Gamage	Herefordshire	52.09°N 02.89°W	SO3944
Mansel Lacy	Herefordshire	52.10°N 02.84°W	SO4245
Manselton	Swansea	51.63°N 03.95°W	SS6595
Mansergh	Cumbria	54.23°N 02.61°W	SD6082
Mansewood	City of Glasgow	55.81°N 04.29°W	NS5660
Mansfield	East Ayrshire	55.40°N 04.18°W	NS6214
Mansfield	Nottinghamshire	53.14°N 01.20°W	SK5361
Mansfield Woodhouse	Nottinghamshire	53.16°N 01.19°W	SK5463
Manson Green	Norfolk	52.58°N 00.98°E	TG0203
Mansriggs	Cumbria	54.21°N 03.09°W	SD2980
Manston	Dorset	50.93°N 02.27°W	ST8115
Manston	Kent	51.34°N 01.35°E	TR3466
Manston	Leeds	53.80°N 01.45°W	SE3634
Manswood	Dorset	50.87°N 02.04°W	ST9708
Manthorpe (Grantham)	Lincolnshire	52.92°N 00.64°W	SK9137
Manthorpe (Bourne)	Lincolnshire	52.72°N 00.41°W	TF0715
Mantles Green	Buckinghamshire	51.66°N 00.62°W	SU9597
Manton	North Lincolnshire	53.50°N 00.59°W	SE9302
Manton	Nottinghamshire	53.29°N 01.11°W	SK5978
Manton	Rutland	52.62°N 00.70°W	SK8804
Manton	Wiltshire	51.41°N 01.75°W	SU1768
Manton Warren	North Lincolnshire	53.53°N 00.59°W	SE9305
Manuden	Essex	51.91°N 00.16°E	TL4926
Manwood Green	Essex	51.78°N 00.23°E	TL5412
Manywells Height	Bradford	53.81°N 01.91°W	SE0635
Maperton	Somerset	51.03°N 02.47°W	ST6726
Maplebeck	Nottinghamshire	53.13°N 00.94°W	SK7160
Maple Cross	Hertfordshire	51.61°N 00.51°W	TQ0392
Mapledurham	Oxfordshire	51.47°N 01.03°W	SU6776
Mapledurwell	Hampshire	51.25°N 01.02°W	SU6851
Maple End	Essex	52.00°N 00.31°E	TL5937
Maplehurst	West Sussex	51.00°N 00.30°W	TQ1924
Mapleton	Derbyshire	53.02°N 01.76°W	SK1647
Mapperley	Derbyshire	52.98°N 01.36°W	SK4343
Mapperley	Nottinghamshire	52.98°N 01.13°W	SK5843
Mapperley Park	Nottinghamshire	52.97°N 01.15°W	SK5742
Mapperton (West Dorset)	Dorset	50.78°N 02.71°W	SY5099
Mapperton (East Dorset)	Dorset	50.78°N 02.14°W	SY9098
Mappleborough Green	Warwickshire	52.28°N 01.88°W	SP0865
Mappleton	East Riding of Yorkshire	53.87°N 00.14°W	TA2244
Mapplewell	Barnsley	53.57°N 01.51°W	SE3209
Mappowder	Dorset	50.85°N 02.38°W	ST7306
