= RAF Aird Uig =

Former RAF base in Scotland

RAF Aird Uig
- Isle of Lewis; Near Stornoway in Scotland
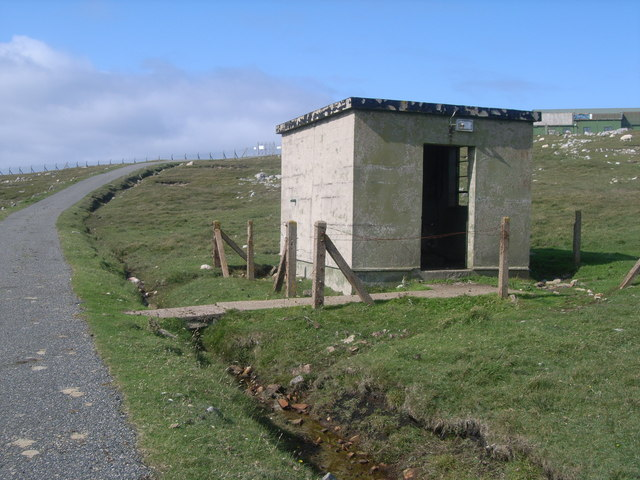
- Old guard house approaching RAF Aird Uig

Site information
- Type: ROTOR and communications station
- Code: WIU
- Owner: Ministry of Defence
- Operator: Royal Air Force; NATO
- Controlled by: RAF Signals Command; No. 71 Signals Unit RAF; No. 81 Signals Unit RAF
- Radar types: Type 13; Type 80 Mk 2

Location
- Location of RAF Aird Uig on Lewis RAF Aird Uig (Outer Hebrides)
- Coordinates: 58°14′16.7″N 7°01′57.9″W
- Grid reference: NB047388
- Area: 84 acres (34 ha)
- Height: 618 ft (188 m)

Site history
- Built: 1954
- In use: 1954-2003 (RAF); 2003-2010 (NATO)
- Fate: Closed

Royal Air Force Aird Uig was a Royal Air Force radar station located on the western edge of the Isle of Lewis in the Outer Hebrides, Scotland. The main masts and operations room were located north of the village of Aird Uig on Gallan Head, with a separate domestic site nearer to the village, five-eighths mile (one kilometre) further south.

The station was originally constructed as part of the ROTOR programme and it was operated by the communications ground trades of the RAF between 1954 and 1974. After ROTOR, the site continued in RAF use as a communications station and radar site until 2000, when the responsibilities of the base were moved to RAF Buchan, near Peterhead in Aberdeenshire. The site was then taken over by NATO as a communications hub before being vacated completely by the military in 2010. In its later years, No. 112 Signals Unit at RAF Stornoway provided the staffing for the day-to-day operation of the site. The Guard House, which is at the entrance to the site, is asbestos contaminated, as are other various buildings on the site.

There are plans to recondition the site and open it to the public as a tourist attraction, observatory and whale listening post.

== History ==
The site at Aird Uig is believed to have a been a look-out point going as far back as the time of the Viking invasions. During the First World War, a hut was placed on the site so that locals who were enlisted in the Auxiliary Coastguard Service could keep watch for enemy ships.

The site was first identified by the Royal Air Force (RAF) in 1950 and construction started soon afterwards as part of the ROTOR 3 programme. The station was one of three in the ROTOR 3 programme that covered the north west of Scotland and were to be the first detection modules for the threat of low flying aircraft attacking from that direction. The other two in the system were located at Faraid Head in Sutherland and Saxa Vord in Shetland. All three sites had a control building (known as an R10) sited above ground, whereas, in previous ROTOR programmes, the control building was normally a bunker.

The station operated, initially, between 1954 and 1974 being worked by elements of the RAF with a working population of 170 service personnel. After 1974, the site fulfilled a need for NATO maritime communications in the North Atlantic by using a Low Frequency (LF) transmitter. Various RAF Signals Units (SU) operated at the station, with No. 71 SU being present between 1957 and 1960 and in later years after the radar equipment had been removed, No. 81 SU, specialising in high frequency (HF) communications, which routinely only needed a minimum of two staff to man the site.

In 1998 the site was temporarily shut down due to corrosion of the communications mast. It was also subject to complaints from the local population over fears from non-ionising radiation. The RAF stated there was no threat but agreed to test equipment when the station restarted operations in 1999.

After the RAF left in 2000, the 618-foot (188-metre) mast was dismantled and the buildings abandoned. NATO used the site as a communications station for their maritime traffic from 2003 onwards. NATO installed 14 new masts at the site to enable a Ship-Shore-Ship Buffer (SSSB) to operate from the station. (Note: AN SSSB is a multi-operator communications platform that was rolled out to NATO members in 1998 and 1999. It was unclear whether Aird Uig was just a relay to Buchan/Boulmer or if NATO allocated staff to the site over and above a skeleton crew for essential maintenance.) This was controlled remotely from RAF Buchan, but when Buchan was downgraded to a remote radar head in September 2004, this was then operated from RAF Boulmer in Northumberland. Whilst some new building took place, the site was abandoned for a second time in 2010.

== Facilities ==
There was a 16-acre (5-hectare) domestic site that was sandwiched between the operation site at Gallan Head and the village of Aird Uig to the south. It had accommodation, the NAAFI, a cinema and small medical facilities, though any serious issues would have to be dealt with at RAF Stornoway on the eastern side of the island.

== Post-military use ==
In 2015, it was announced that the local community had received £200,000 worth of funding from the Scottish Land Fund (SLF) to buy the site and turn it into a visitor centre. The funding would be used by the Gallan Head Community Trust to convert the 84-acre (34-hectare) site and build a visitor centre, gallery and observatory. It is also planned to install underwater microphones to allow the public to listen in to whales and other sea mammals. This work will most likely start in late 2017, if not mid-2018.

Applications were being made by the community for Ministry of Defence funding to allow renovation of the site as, apart from the masts and some ancillary equipment, most of the buildings were left standing and abandoned. The headland itself has also been opened up to the public, with some areas adjacent to the coastline being accessible for the first time in over 60 years.
