= Mailand =

Mailand may refer to:

- Mailand, Shetland, a hamlet on Unst, one of the Shetland Islands
- Mailand, the German name for Milan, Italy
- Mailand Upper Secondary School, a school in Lørenskog, Norway
- Ingeborg Suhr Mailand (1871–1969), Danish educator

== See also ==
- Mayländer, a surname
