= Aird Uig =

Coordinates: 58.231°N 7.029°W

Aird Uig: Scottish Gaelic: Àird Ùig
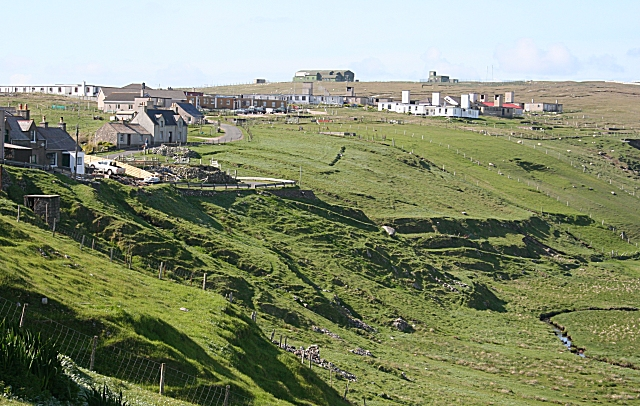
- Buildings at Aird Uig

- Location within the Outer Hebrides
- Language: Scottish Gaelic; English
- OS grid reference: NB048379
- Civil parish: Uig
- Council area: Na h-Eileanan Siar
- Lieutenancy area: Western Isles
- Country: Scotland
- Sovereign state: United Kingdom
- Post town: ISLE OF LEWIS
- Postcode district: HS2
- Dialling code: 01851
- Police: Scotland
- Fire: Scottish
- Ambulance: Scottish
- UK Parliament: Na h-Eileanan an Iar
- Scottish Parliament: Na h-Eileanan an Iar

Aird Uig (Scottish Gaelic: Àird Ùig) is a village on the Isle of Lewis, in the Outer Hebrides, Scotland. Aird Uig is within the parish of Uig, and is situated on the C40 minor road which joins to the B8011 at Timsgarry. The township includes 700 hectares (1,700 acres) of common grazings to the east and west of the village.

Aird Uig is a village of two distinctive characters. The south end is composed of a traditional crofting community whilst the north end is a composite of army barracks and buildings many of which have been converted into homes. The Headquarters and NAAFI shop building are now the Gallan Head Hotel & Restaurant.

== History ==
Aird Uig was first settled in 1825 by crofters evicted from a nearby township of Carnish. Aird was chosen because of its remoteness and it was very difficult land to work, therefore of no interest to landowners.

Between 1954 and 2010, the Royal Air Force (and latterly, NATO), operated a RADAR site at Gallan Head called RAF Aird Uig. The community is now trying to open the former base to the public as an observatory, gallery and whale listening post.

== Landmarks ==
=== Taigh a’ Bheannaich ===
Taigh a’ Bheannaich (House of Blessings, or Blessing House) are the ruins of a church situated on a small headland at Druim Bheannaich to the west of Loch a’ Bheannaich.

=== RAF Aird Uig ===
Royal Air Force Aird Uig was a Royal Air Force radar station. The station was originally constructed as part of the ROTOR programme and it was operated by the communications ground trades of the RAF between 1954 and 1974. After ROTOR, the site continued in RAF use as a communications station and radar site until 2000, when the responsibilities of the base were moved to RAF Buchan, near Peterhead in Aberdeenshire. The site was then taken over by NATO as a communications hub before being vacated completely by the military in 2010.
