= Scarinish =

Village on the Isle of Tiree, Scotland

Coordinates: 56.5012°N 6.8072°W

Scarinish: Scottish Gaelic: Sgairinis
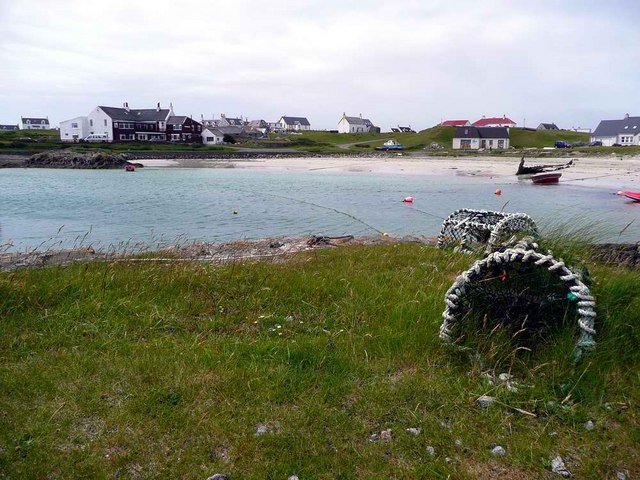
- Scarinish harbour

- Location within Argyll and Bute
- OS grid reference: NM043449
  - Edinburgh: 144 mi (232 km)
  - London: 439 mi (707 km)
- Council area: Argyll and Bute
- Lieutenancy area: Argyll and Bute
- Country: Scotland
- Sovereign state: United Kingdom
- Post town: ISLE OF TIREE
- Postcode district: PA77
- Dialling code: 01879
- Police: Scotland
- Fire: Scottish
- Ambulance: Scottish
- UK Parliament: Argyll, Bute and South Lochaber
- Scottish Parliament: Argyll and Bute

Scarinish (Scottish Gaelic: Sgairinis [ˈs̪kaɾʲɪnɪʃ]) is the main village on the island of Tiree, in the Inner Hebrides of Scotland. It is located on the south coast of the island, between Hynish Bay to the southwest and Gott Bay to the northeast. The harbour was built in 1771. In 1961 it had a population of 103.

The village has the only bank on the island (a branch of the Royal Bank of Scotland), a Co-op grocery store, a Post Office and a small row of shops including a coffee shop.

The Tiree ferry terminal is located there, with a ferry service that runs to Oban on the Scottish mainland. A ferry shelter, called 'An Turas', completed in March 2003 won the RIAS Andrew Doolan Best Building in Scotland Award that year.
