= Tiree Wave Classic =

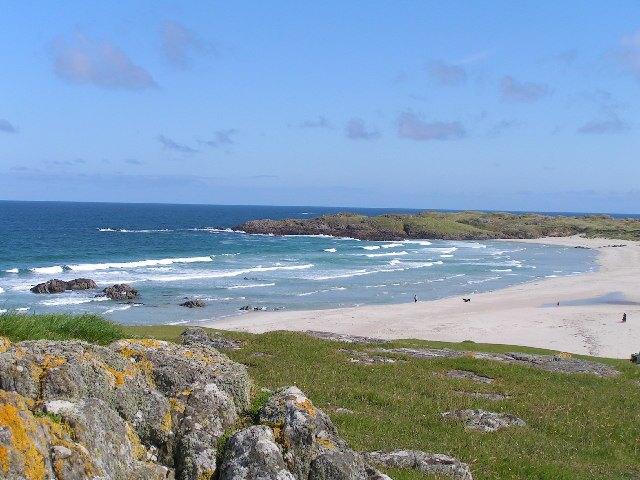
Tràigh Baile a' Mhuilinn on the north west coast of Tiree

The Tiree Wave Classic is the UK's premier windsurfing competition. Originally run by Glasgow-based events company Dialogue Marketing headed up by Andy Groom. It has in more recent years been run by Tiree based Windsurfing school Wild Diamond headed by Tiree local Windsurfer William Angus Maclean. It takes place each October on the island of Tiree on the west coast of Scotland.

Tiree Wave Classic was set up in 1986 and was part of the PWA Professional Windsurfing World Tour in 2007. In recent years the event has reverted to national level, and is now part of the British Wavesailing Association UK Tour. The event has dedicated worldwide TV coverage and attracts hundreds of visitors to the island each year, making the Classic a significant annual economic driver for the island.

At the six-day event, competitors in four categories (Professionals, Amateurs, Masters and Ladies) take part in wave sailing competition.
