= Maen-y-groes =

Village in Ceredigion, Wales

Coordinates: 52.202248°N 4.365246°W

- Location within Ceredigion
- OS grid reference: SN 3846 5864
  - Cardiff: 71 mi (114 km)
  - London: 187 mi (301 km)
- Community: Llanllwchaiarn
- Principal area: Ceredigion
- Country: Wales
- Sovereign state: United Kingdom
- Post town: Ceinewydd
- Postcode district: SA45
- Police: Dyfed-Powys
- Fire: Mid and West Wales
- Ambulance: Welsh
- UK Parliament: Ceredigion Preseli
- Senedd Cymru – Welsh Parliament: Ceredigion

Maen-y-groes is a hamlet in the community of Llanllwchaiarn, Ceredigion, Wales, which is 71 miles (114.3 km) from Cardiff and 187 miles (300.9 km) from London. Maen-y-groes is represented in the Senedd by Elin Jones (Plaid Cymru) and is part of the Ceredigion Preseli constituency in the House of Commons.

== Etymology ==
The name derives from the Welsh language: "the stone of the Cross".

== See also ==
- List of localities in Wales by population
