= No. 518 Squadron RAF =

Defunct flying squadron of the Royal Air Force

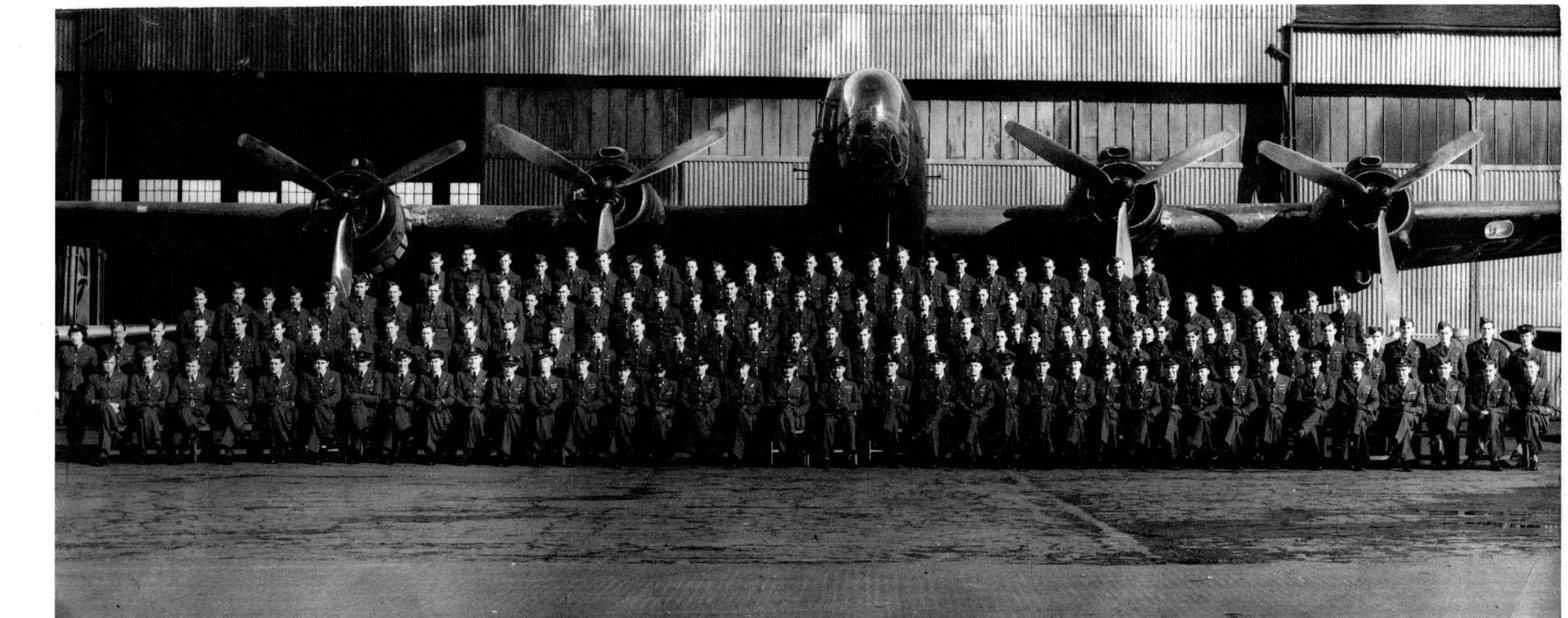
- RAF squadron 518 in Tiree.
- Active: 6 July 1943 – 1 October 1946
- Country: United Kingdom
- Branch: Royal Air Force
- Type: Flying squadron
- Role: Meteorological reconnaissance
- Part of: No. 15 Group RAF, Coastal Command
- Mottos: Gaelic: Tha An Iuchair Againn-Ne (Translation: "We hold the key")

Insignia
- Squadron Badge heraldry: A hand couped at the wrist holding a key, the ward uppermost
- Squadron Codes: Y3 (Jun 1944 – Oct 1946)

No. 518 Squadron RAF was a meteorological squadron of the Royal Air Force during the Second World War. The weather observations they collected helped inform Group Captain James Martin Stagg's recommendation to General Dwight D. Eisenhower to delay the launching of the D-Day invasion of Normandy from 5 June to 6 June 1944.

== History ==
No. 518 Squadron formed on 6 July 1943 at RAF Stornoway, situated on the Isle of Lewis, in the Western Isles of Scotland. It was equipped with the Handley Page Halifax, a British four-engined heavy bomber. After moving to RAF Tiree on 25 September 1943, and absorbing No. 1402 Flight, it became operational with daily sorties out into the North Atlantic to collect meteorological data. It also undertook reconnaissance for Kriegsmarine U-boat activity.

Ten hour flights were normal.The flights collected information on barometric pressure, temperature and humidity plus weather, cloud and wind velocity data. The detailed information was sent back by wireless every half hour in meteorological code and wartime cypher. The flights were codenamed "Bismuth" and "Mercer". It was crucial that the pilot fly at exactly the right height and follow the other instructions given by the met observer and the navigator. The navigation had to be spot-on so that the readings taken by the met observer were correct. The flights had to be made, no matter what. During 1944, 518 squadron flew every single day but two. On one of these days the trip was aborted because snow on the runway had hardened to ice and the plane slipped off.

In the run-up to D-Day, during the late spring of 1944, the squadron, operating modified Halifax bomber aircraft out of RAF Tiree, located in the inner Hebrides, and often under dangerous weather conditions, collected weather observations from hundreds of miles into the Atlantic; these reports were used by Group Captain James Martin Stagg in his recommendation to General Dwight D. Eisenhower that the D-Day invasion of Normandy be postponed from 5 to 6 June 1944.

Flights often returned with only three engines running. Sometimes two. During the squadron's time at Tiree, there were 12 crashes or losses of aircraft.

There is a memorial in Tiree to the two Halifax aircrew who lost their lives when their aircraft collided over the airfield on Wednesday 16 August 1944. This memorial was unveiled by Kenneth Organ on 16 August 2014. Attending the ceremony was Antonín Hradilek, Deputy Ambassador of the Embassy of the Czech Republic. Amongst those killed was Leonard Revilliod, grandson of Tomáš Masaryk, the first President of the newly formed Republic of Czechoslovakia in 1918

After the end of the Second World War the squadron moved to RAF Aldergrove in Northern Ireland, where it absorbed No. 1402 (Meteorological) Flight RAF, which had been operating Supermarine Spitfire, and Hawker Hurricane, two types of British single-seat fighter aircraft. With these aircraft added to the squadron inventory, the main equipment was also changed from the Handley Page Halifax Mk.V to the Mk.VI variants. No. 518 squadron was the last of the wartime meteorological squadrons when it was re-numbered to 202 Squadron on 1 October 1946.

Page from logbook of Met Observer Robert Shepherd of 518 squadron. Includes incident where all four engines stopped due to ice

== Aircraft operated ==
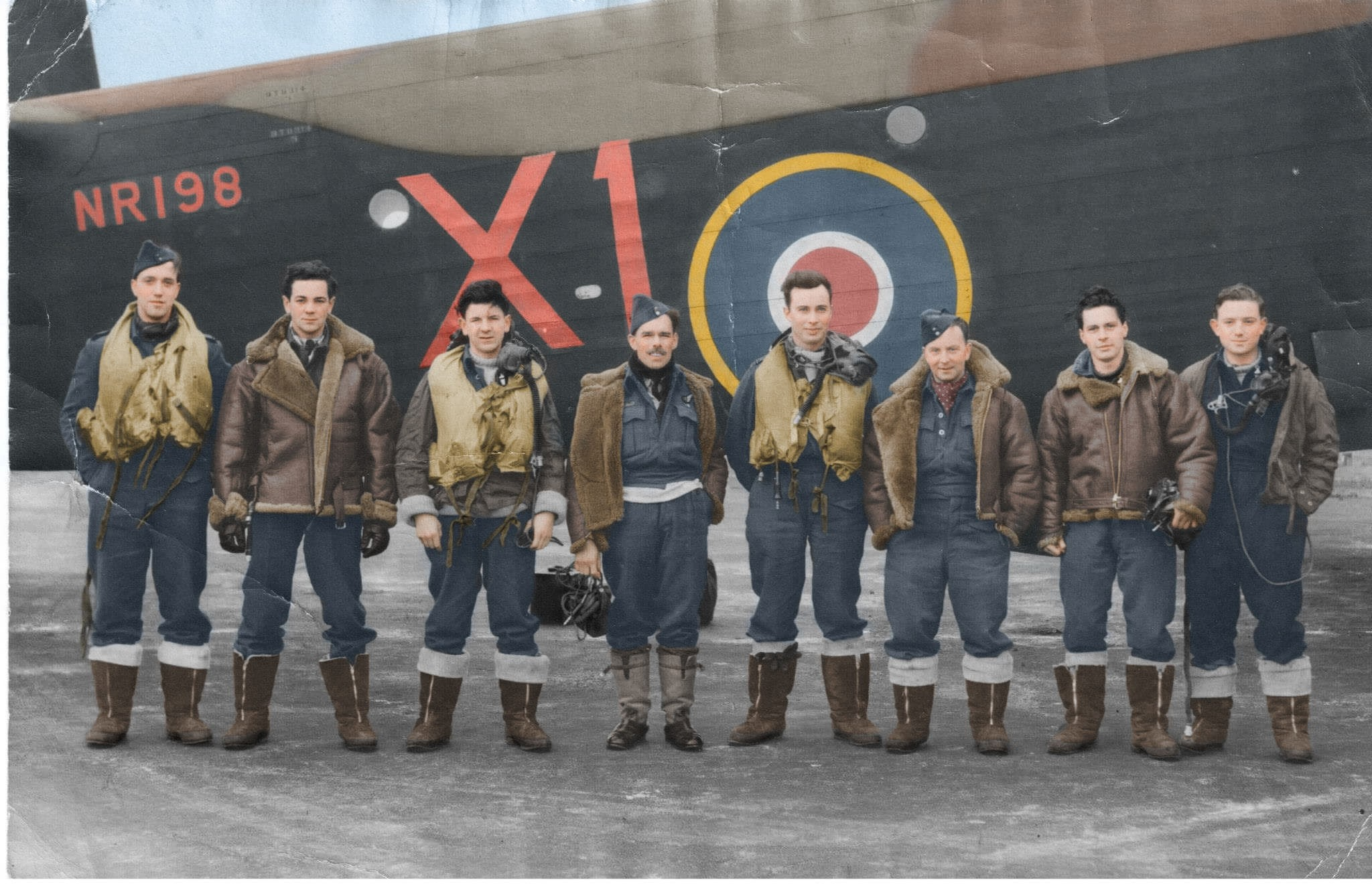
Halifax 518 squadron artificially coloured.

Aircraft operated by no. 518 Squadron RAF, data from
From	To	Aircraft	Version
July 1943	June 1945	Handley Page Halifax	Mk.V
March 1945	October 1946	Handley Page Halifax	Mk.III
September 1945	October 1946	Supermarine Spitfire	Mks.VII & IX
September 1945	October 1946	Hawker Hurricane	Mk.IIc
March 1946	October 1946	Handley Page Halifax	Mk.VI

== Squadron bases ==
Bases and airfields used by no. 518 Squadron RAF, data from
From	To	Base	Remark
9 July 1943	25 September 1943	RAF Stornoway, Western Isles, Scotland	
25 September 1943	18 September 1945	RAF Tiree, Hebrides, Scotland	Spitfire detachment at RAF Tain, Ross and Cromarty, Scotland
18 September 1945	1 October 1946	RAF Aldergrove, County Antrim, Northern Ireland	

== See also ==
- List of Royal Air Force aircraft squadrons
