= Tiree =

Most westerly island in the Inner Hebrides of Scotland

Tiriodh (Gaelic)
- Sun of Barley flag adopted in 2018

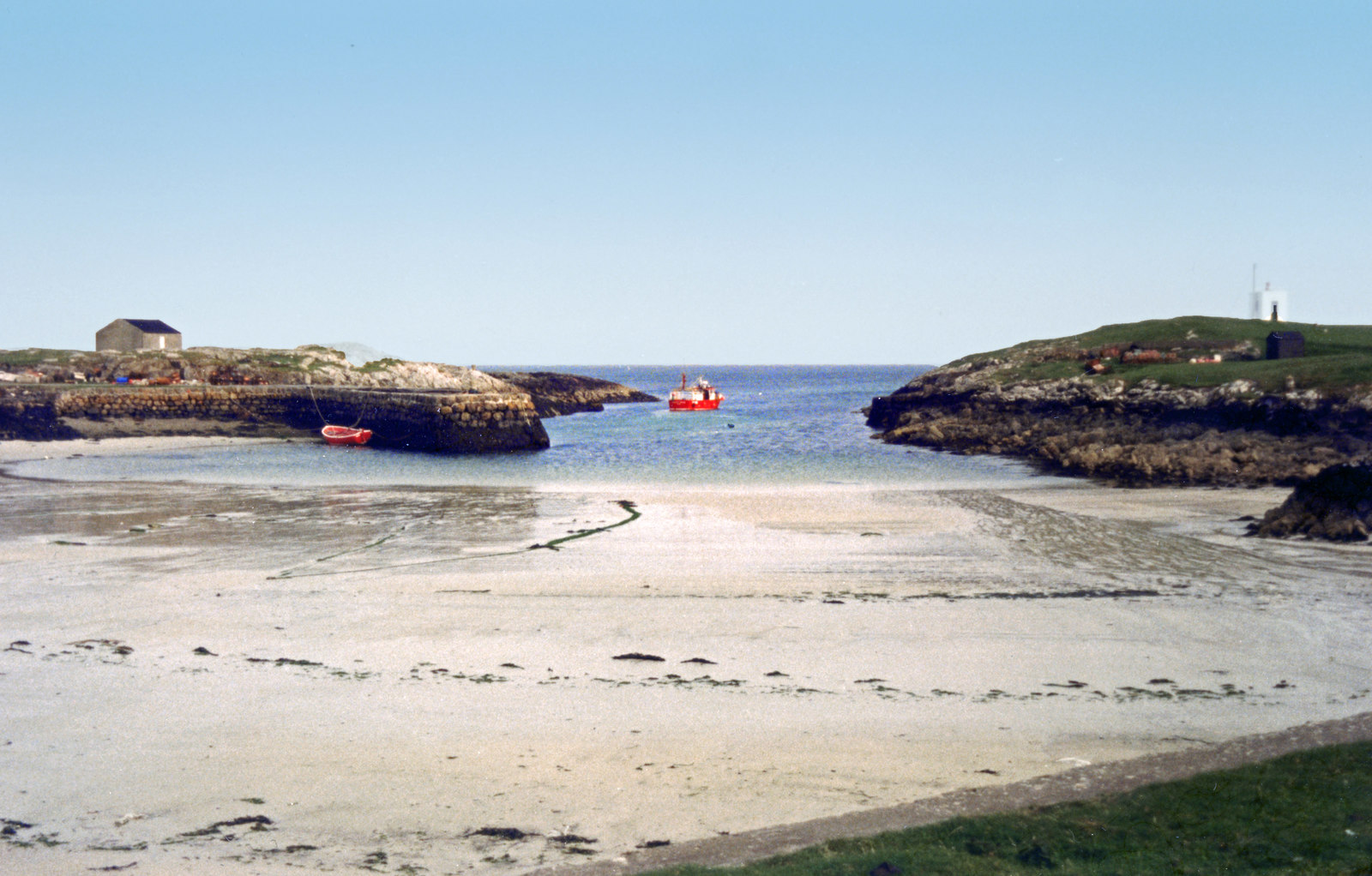
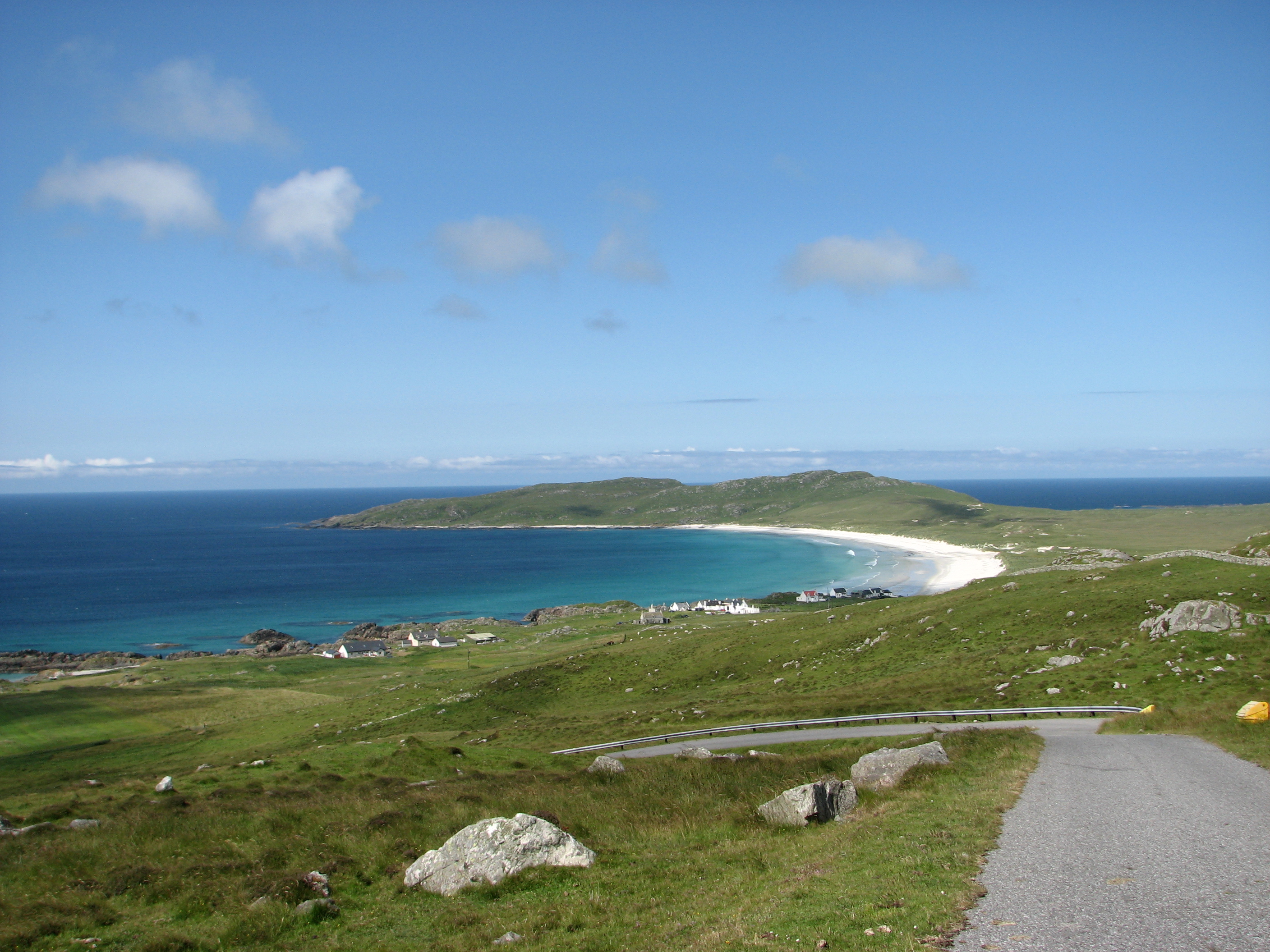
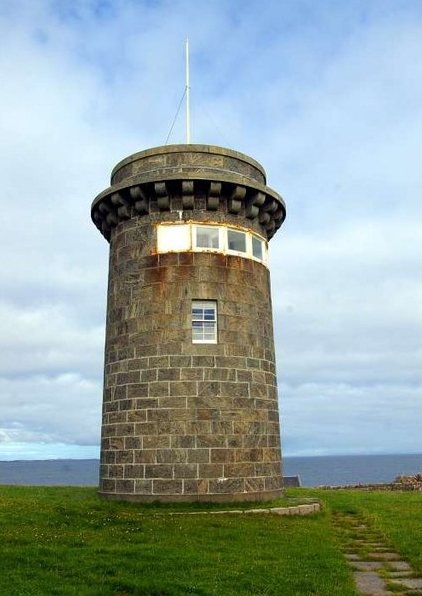
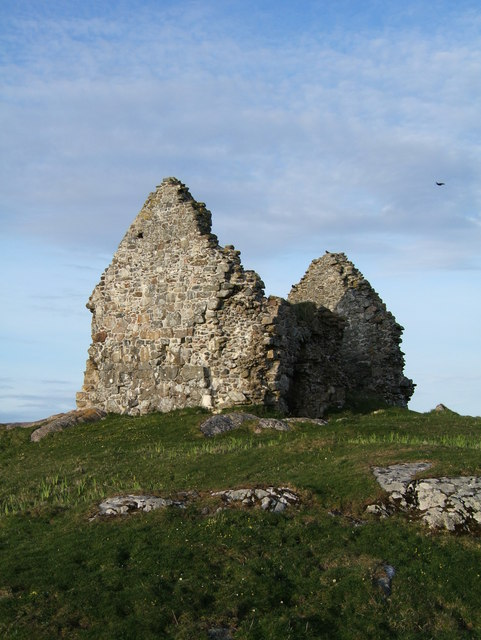
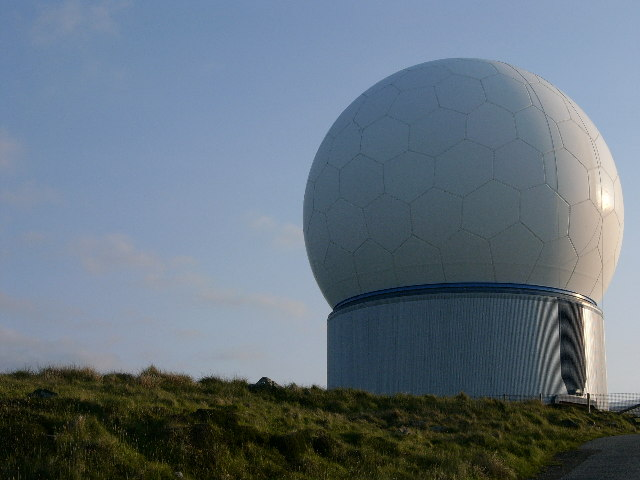
- Scarinish harbour Balephuil Bay Hynish signal Kirkapol chapel The 'Golf Ball'

Location
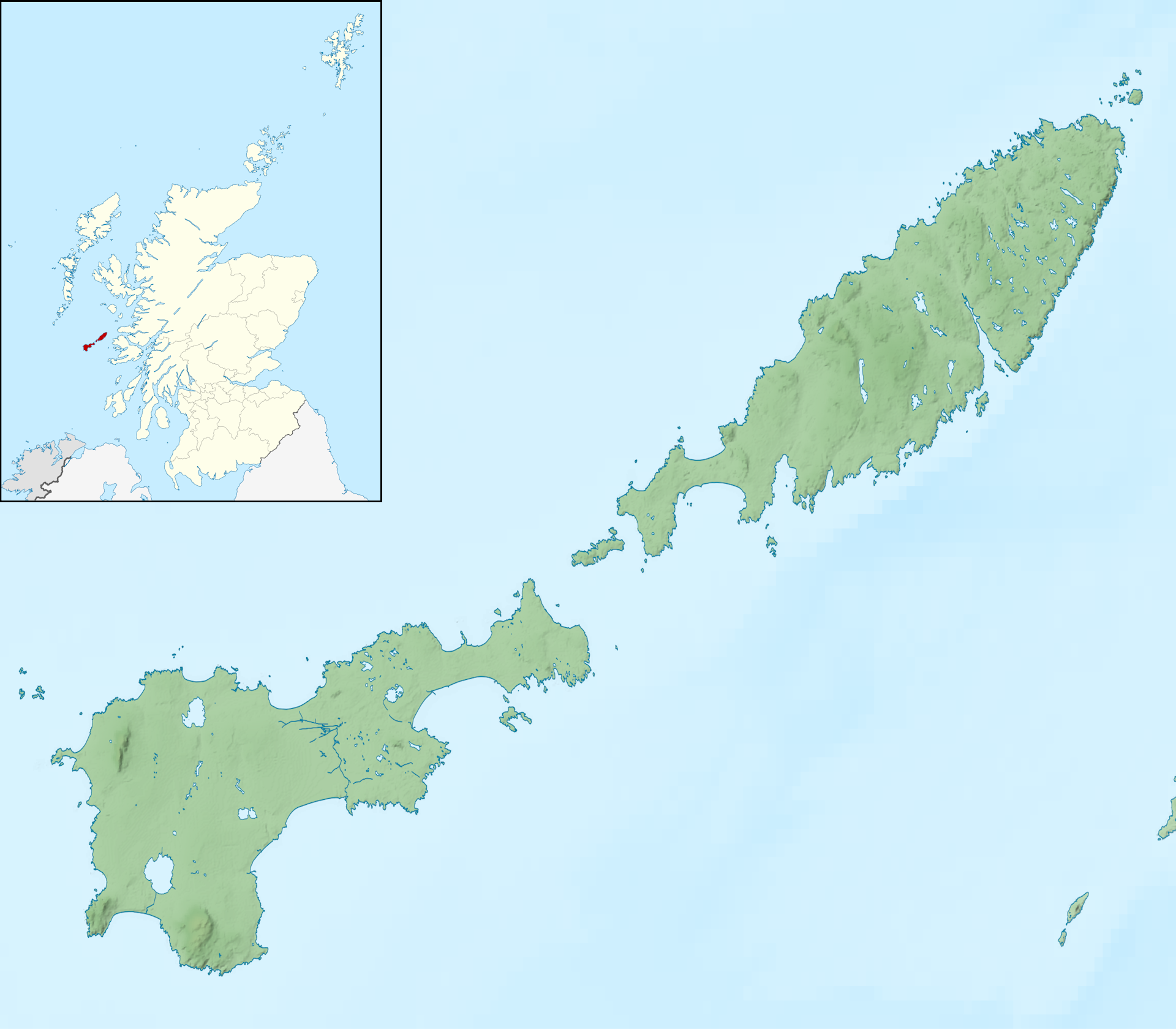
- Tiree shown next to Coll Tiree within Argyll and Bute Tiree within Scotland
- OS grid reference: NL999458
- Coordinates: 56.5°N 6.88°W

Name
- Gaelic pronunciation: [ˈtʲʰiɾʲəɣ]
- Name meaning: Gaelic for 'land of corn'
- Old Norse name: Tyrvist

Physical geography
- Area: 7,834 ha (30 1/4 sq mi)
- Area rank: 17
- Highest elevation: Ben Hynish 141 m (463 ft)

Administration
- Council area: Argyll and Bute
- Country: Scotland
- Sovereign state: United Kingdom

Demographics
- Population: 700
- Population rank: 18
- Population density: 8.9/km^{2} (23/sq mi)
- Largest settlement: Scarinish

Tiree (Note: /taɪˈriː/; Scottish Gaelic: Tiriodh, pronounced [ˈtʲʰiɾʲəɣ]) is the most westerly island in the Inner Hebrides of Scotland. The low-lying island, southwest of Coll, has an area of 7,834 hectares (30 1/4 square miles) and a population of around 700.

The land is highly fertile, and crofting, alongside tourism, and fishing are the main sources of employment for the islanders. Tiree, along with Colonsay, enjoys a relatively high number of total hours of sunshine during the late spring and early summer compared to the average for the United Kingdom. Tiree is a popular windsurfing venue; it is sometimes referred to as the "Hawaii of the north". Over the years, the Tiree Wave Classic wind surfing event is held here. People native to the island are known as Tirisdich.

== History ==
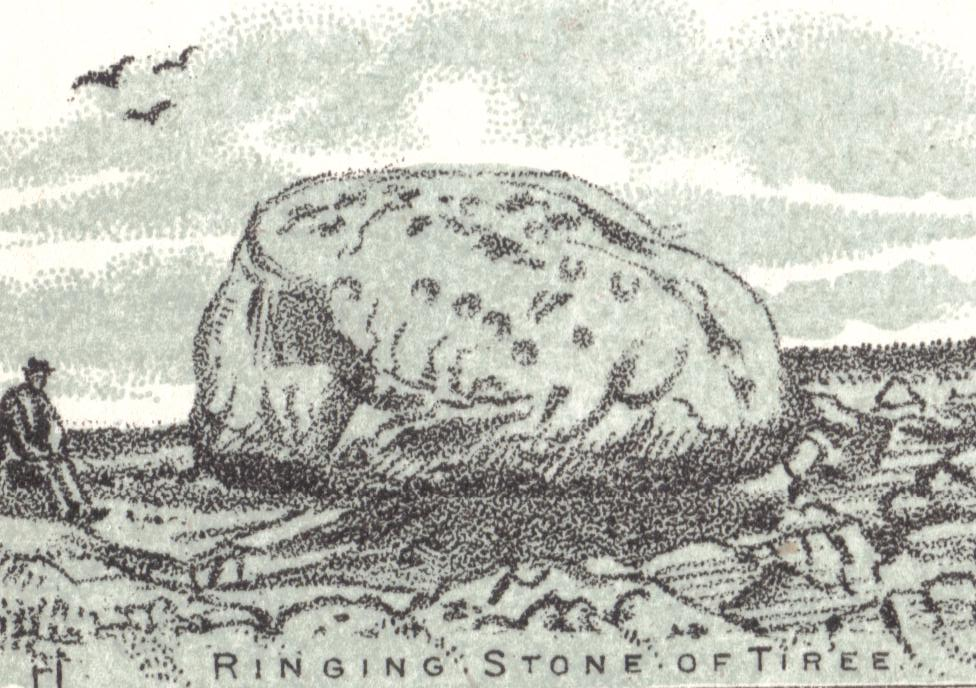
The Ringing Stone – a Cup and ring mark stone in 1892.

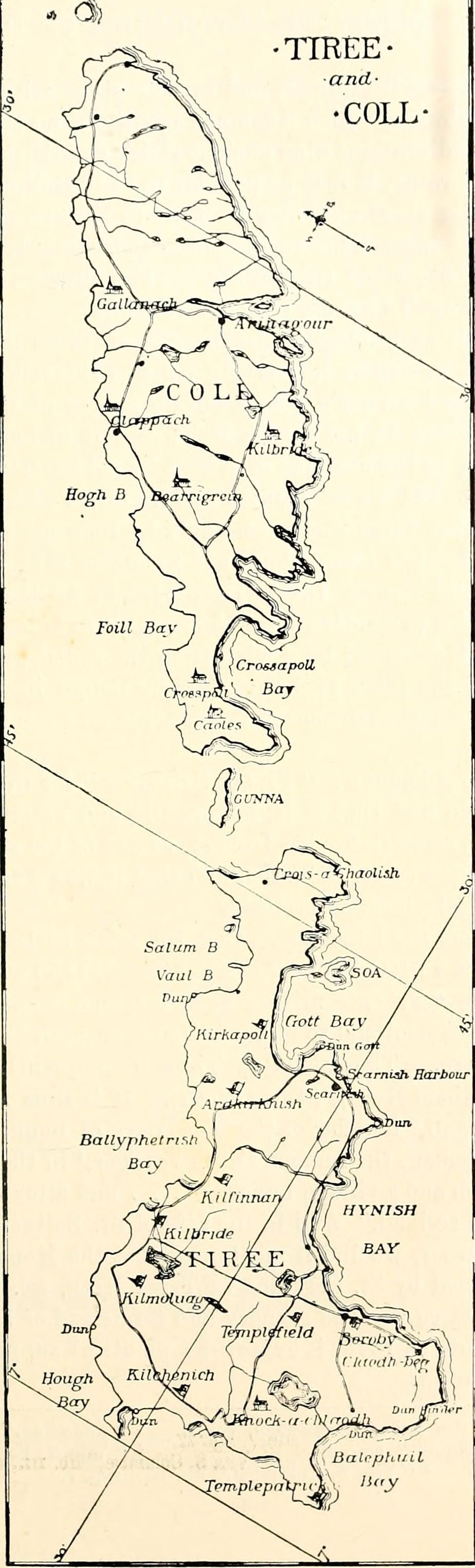
Map of Tiree (bottom, southwest) and Coll (top, northeast), 1899.

Upper Palaeolithic stone tools of the Ahrensburgian culture have been found on the island, suggesting the island has been inhabited since the end of the Last Ice Age.

Tiree is known for the 1st-century-AD Dùn Mòr broch, for the prehistoric carved Ringing Stone and for the birds of the Ceann a' Mhara headland.

Adomnán, abbot of Iona Abbey 679–704, recorded several stories relating to St Columba and the island of Tiree.

In one story, Columba warned a monk called Berach not to sail directly from Iona to Tiree, and instead to take a different route, and the monk went against his advice and sailed directly, but along the way, a huge whale came out of the sea and almost destroyed their boat. Columba gave the same warning to Baithéne mac Brénaind who replied that both he and the whale were in God's hands, and Columba told him to go because his faith would save him. And Baithene set off for Tiree, and when the whale appeared, he raised his hands and blessed it and it went back down into the ocean.

In another story, Adomnán claimed there to be a monastery on the island of Tiree that was called Artchain.

In another story, Adomnán claimed that Baithéne mac Brénaind asked Columba to pray for a good wind to get him to Tiree, and it was given to him, and he crossed the sea from Iona to Tiree with full sail. In another story, Columba instructed a particular monk to go to the monastery on Tiree and do penance for seven years. In another story, Columba banished some demons from Iona who then went to the island of Tiree to afflict the monks there instead. Adomnán also records there being more than one monastery on Tiree in that time period, and that Baithéne mac Brénaind had been abbot of one of these monasteries.

Writing in 1549, Donald Munro, High Dean of the Isles wrote of "Thiridh" that it was: "ane mane laich fertile fruitful cuntrie... All inhabite and manurit with twa paroche kirkis in it, ane fresh water loch with an auld castell. Na cuntrie may be mair fertile of corn and very gude for wild fowls and for fishe, with ane gude heavin for heiland galayis". (Note: English translation from Lowland Scots: "a low-lying fertile fruitful country... Its entirety is inhabited and manured and there are two parish churches and a freshwater lake with an old castle. Nowhere is more fertile for corn and it is good for wild fowl and fish, with a good harbour for Highland galleys.")

In 1770, half of the island was held by fourteen farmers who had drained land for hay and pasture. Instead of exporting live cattle (which were often exhausted by the long journey to market and so fetched low prices), they began to export salt beef in barrels to get better prices. The rest of the island was let to 45 groups of tenants on co-operative joint farms: agricultural organisations probably dating from clan times. Field strips were allocated by annual ballot. Sowing and harvesting dates were decided communally. It is reported that in 1774, Tiresians were 'well-clothed and well-fed, having an abundance of corn and cattle'.

Its name derives from Tìr Iodh, 'land of the corn', from the days of the 6th century Celtic missionary and abbot St Columba (d. 597). Tiree provided the monastic community on the island of Iona, southeast of the island, with grain. A number of early monasteries once existed on Tiree itself, and several sites have stone cross-slabs from this period, such as St Patrick's Chapel, Ceann a' Mhara (NL 938 401) and Soroby (NL 984 416).

Skerryvore lighthouse, 12 miles (19 kilometres) south west of Tiree, was built with some difficulty between 1838 and 1844 by Alan Stevenson.

The annual reports of the Fishery Board for Scotland provide an insight into the decline of fishing from Tiree in the years before the First World War. The report for 1895 states that the fish were: "mostly landed by visting crews from the East Coast".

Fishery Statistics

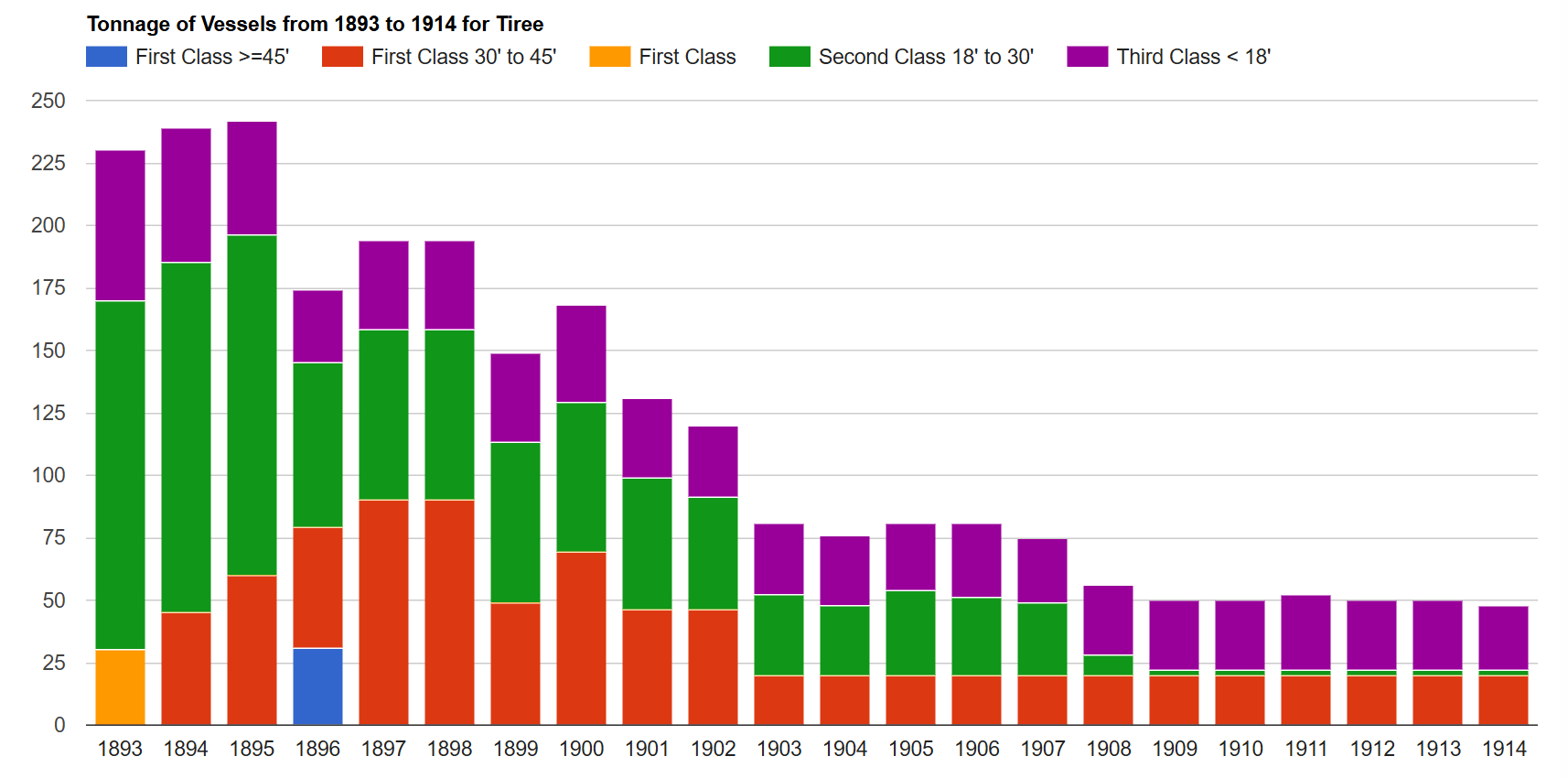
Tonnage of vessels

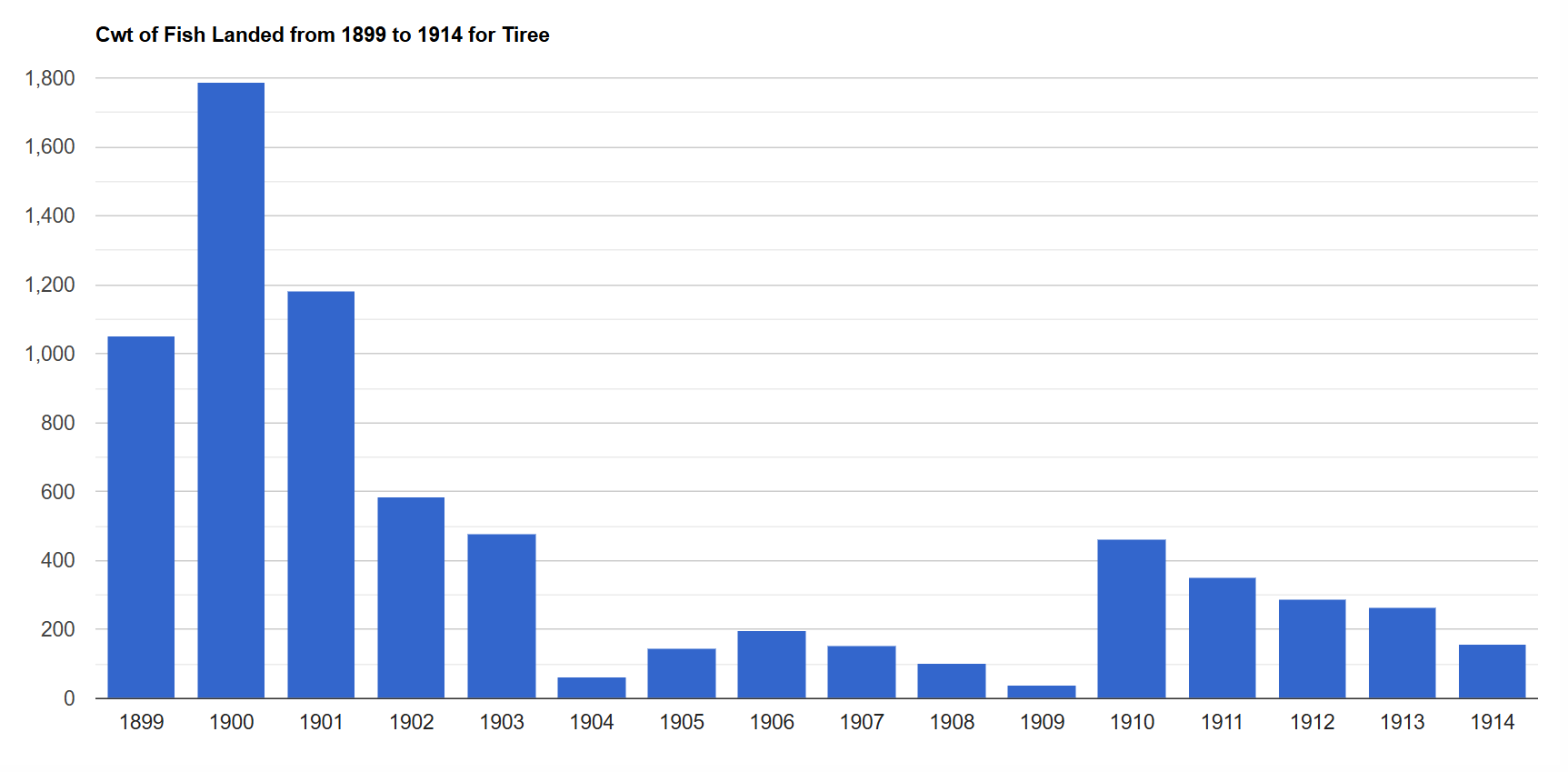
Cwt of fish landed

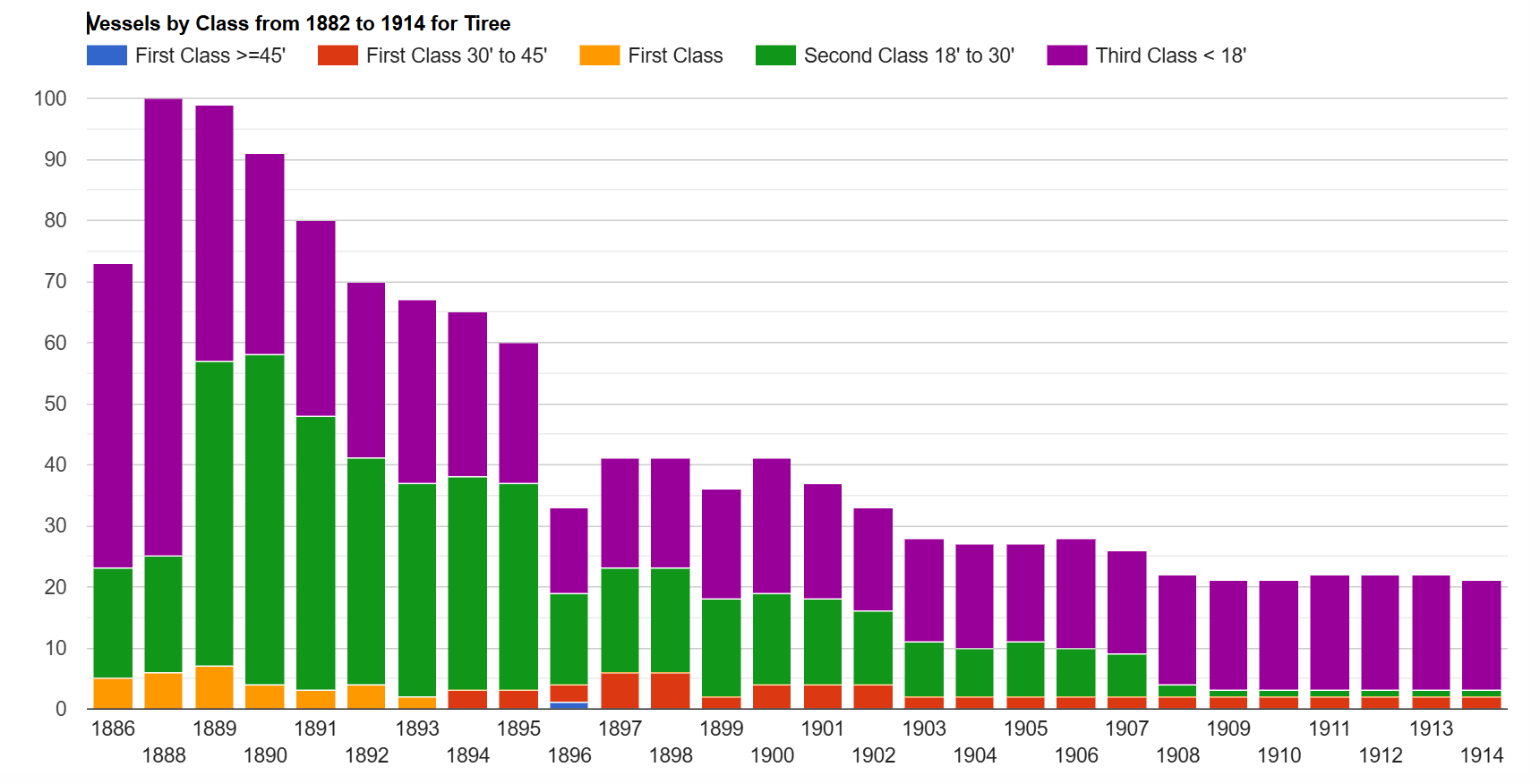
Vessels by class

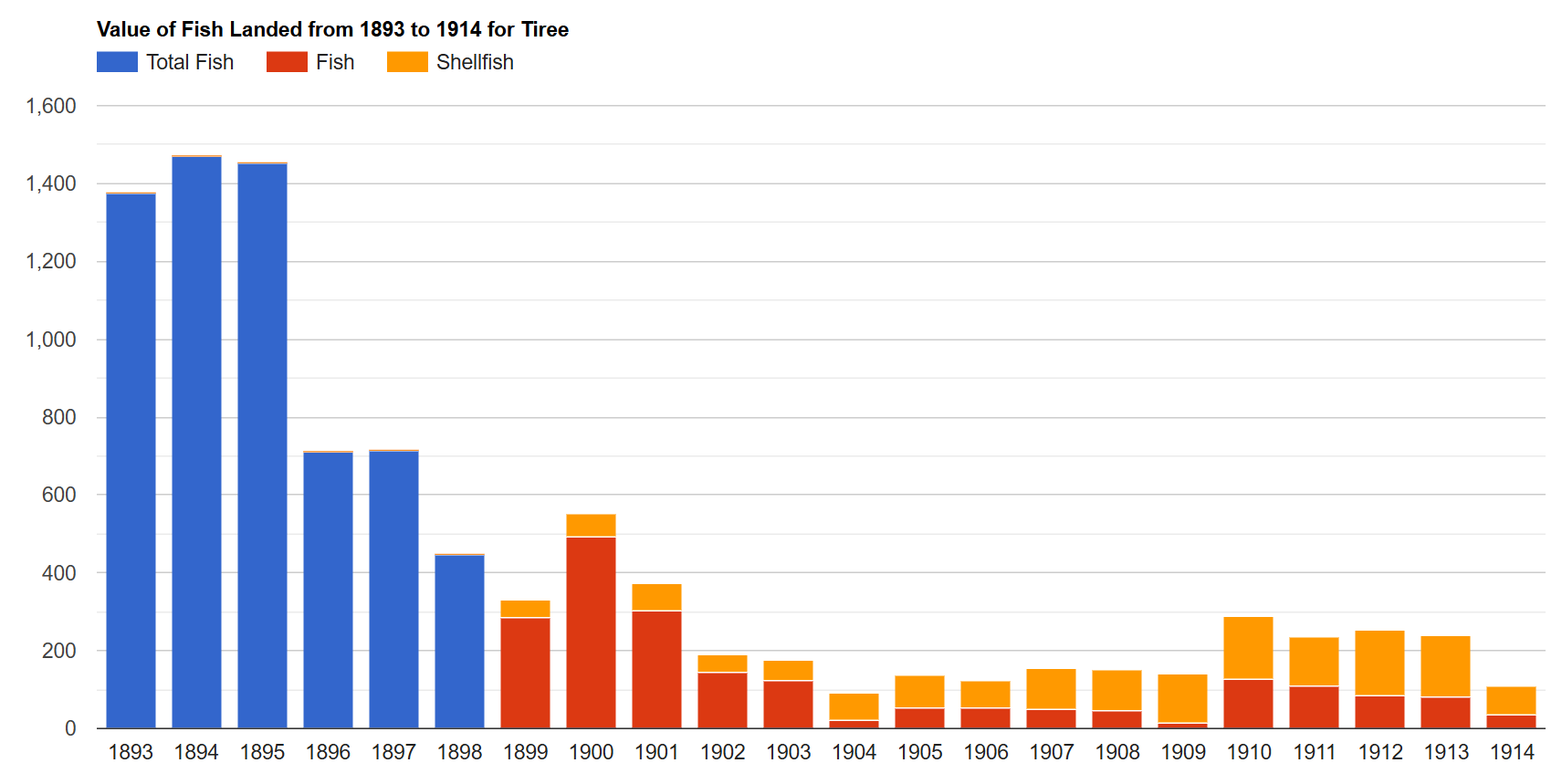
Value (£) of fish landed

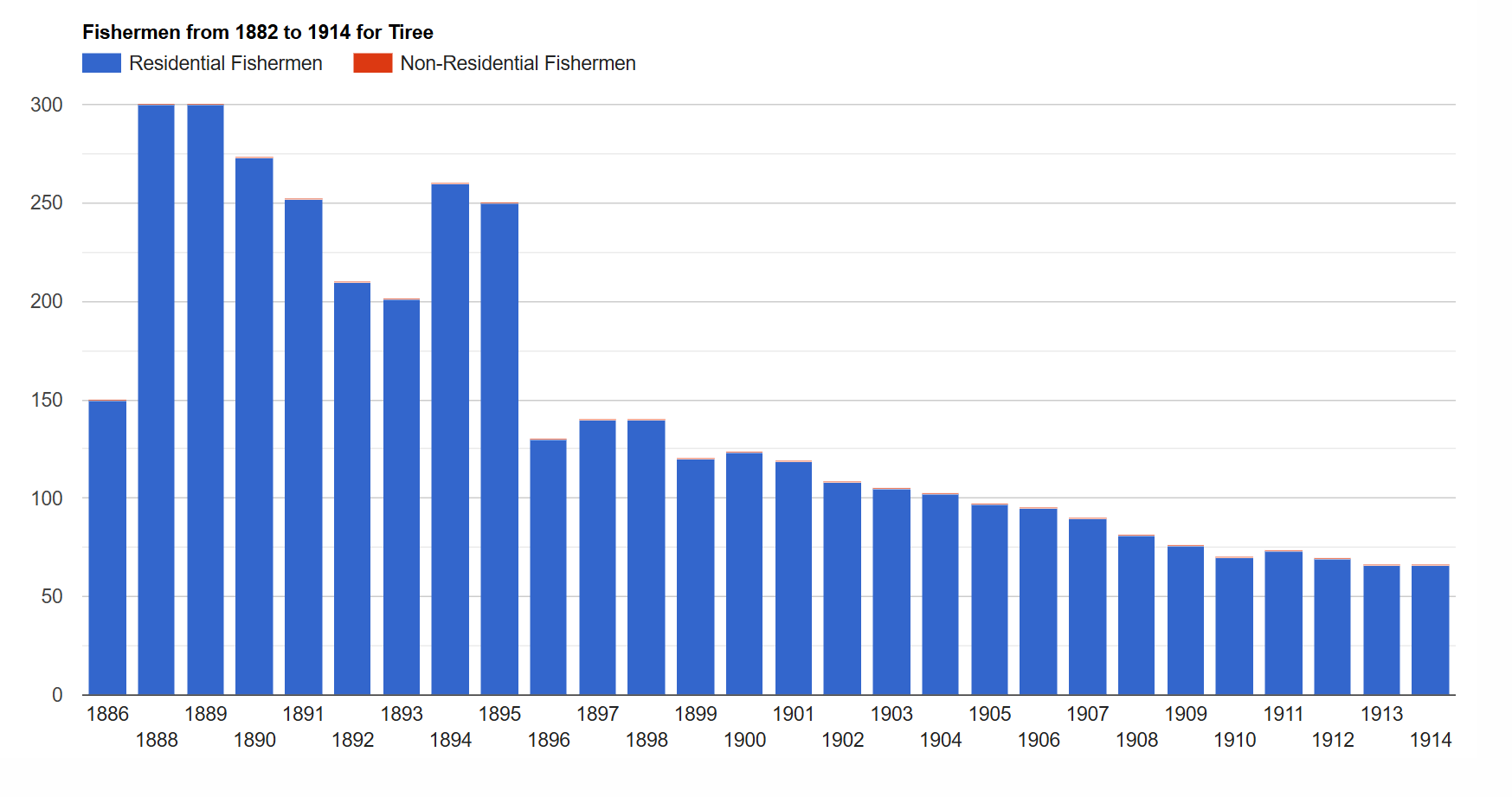
Fishermen

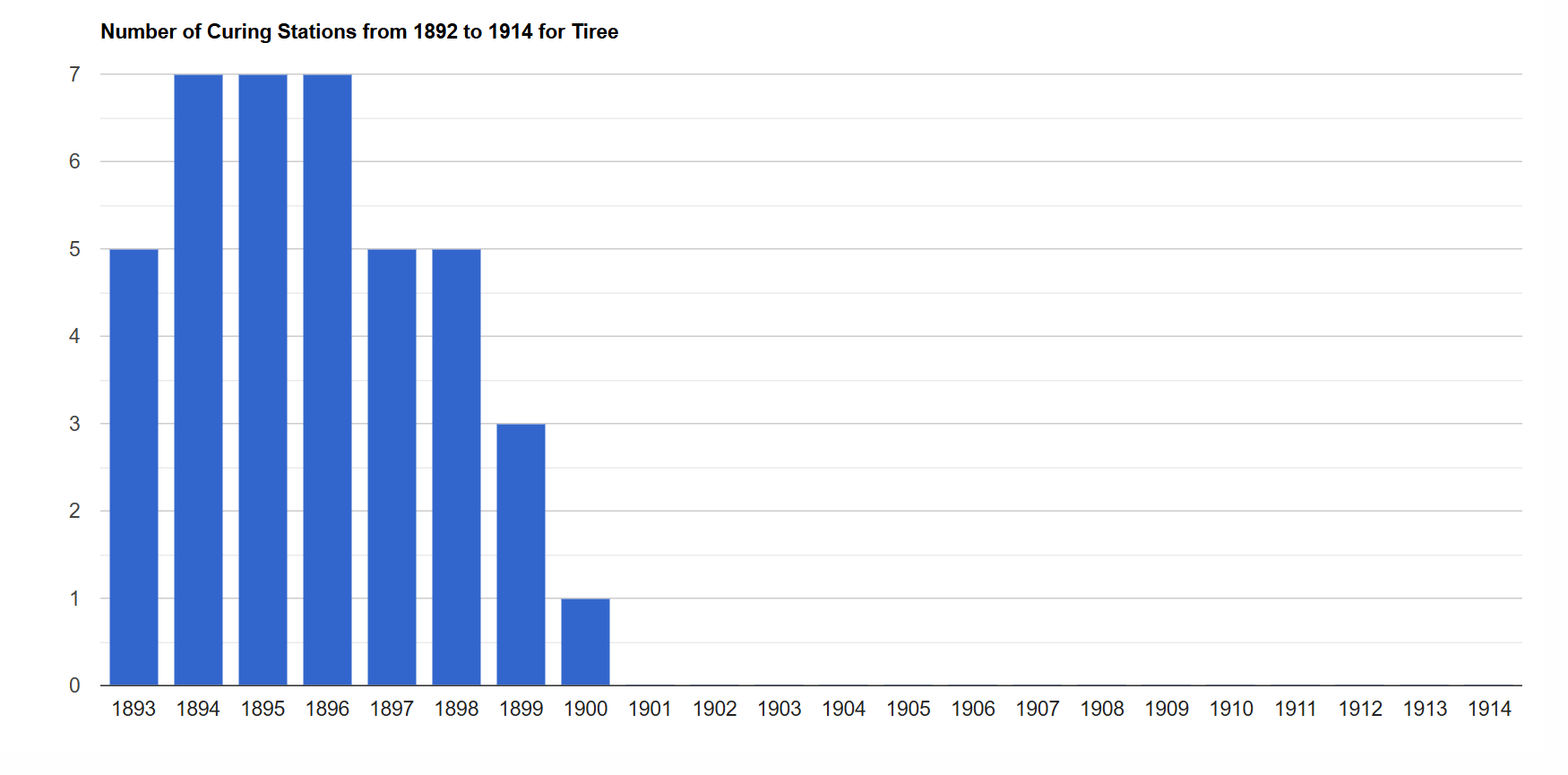
Number of curing stations

A large Royal Air Force station was built on Tiree during World War II. The weather observations from squadron 518 collected helped inform Group Captain James Martin Stagg's recommendation to General Dwight D. Eisenhower to delay the launching of the D-Day invasion of Normandy from 5 June to 6 June 1944. The airfield became Tiree Airport in 1947. There was also an RAF Chain Home radar station at Kilkenneth and an RAF Chain Home Low radar station at Beinn Hough. These were preceded by a temporary RAF Advanced Chain Home radar station at Port Mor and an RAF Chain Home Beam radar station at Barrapol. Post-war there was RAF Scarinish ROTOR radar station at Beinn Ghott.

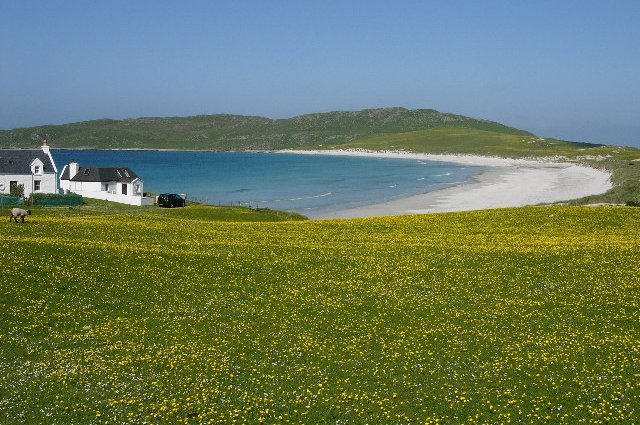
Looking west to Balephuil Bay, across the famous Hebridean Machair

== Geology ==
Tiree is formed largely from gneiss forming the Lewisian complex, a suite of metamorphic rocks of Archaean to early Proterozoic age. Granite of Archaean age is found locally. Igneous intrusions of dolerite, felsite, lamprophyre and diorite of Palaeozoic age are encountered in places. The eastern part of the island is traversed by numerous normal faults most of which run broadly northwest–southeast. Quaternary sediments include raised beach deposits which are extensive across the island and incorporate areas of alluvium locally. There are considerable areas of blown sand in the west and behind the major bays elsewhere.

== Geography ==
The main village on Tiree is Scarinish. Mannal is a coastal hamlet in the south west.

The highest point on Tiree is Ben Hynish, to the south of the island, which rises to 141 metres (463 feet).

== Transport ==
Caledonian MacBrayne operate a ferry to Scarinish. The daily crossing from Oban on the mainland takes four hours. A call is made at Arinagour on Coll and once a week the ferry crosses to Castlebay on Barra. More limited services operate in Winter.

Tiree Airport is located at Crossapol. Loganair provide daily flights to Glasgow International and Hebridean Air Services fly to Coll and Oban.

Roads on Tiree, in common with many other small islands, are nearly all single-track roads. There are passing places, locally called 'pockets' or 'passing places', where cars must wait to enable oncoming traffic to pass or overtake.

Preceding station	Ferry	Following station
Coll	Caledonian MacBrayne; Ferry	Oban
Coll	Caledonian MacBrayne; Ferry (limited service, summer only)	Castlebay

== Climate ==
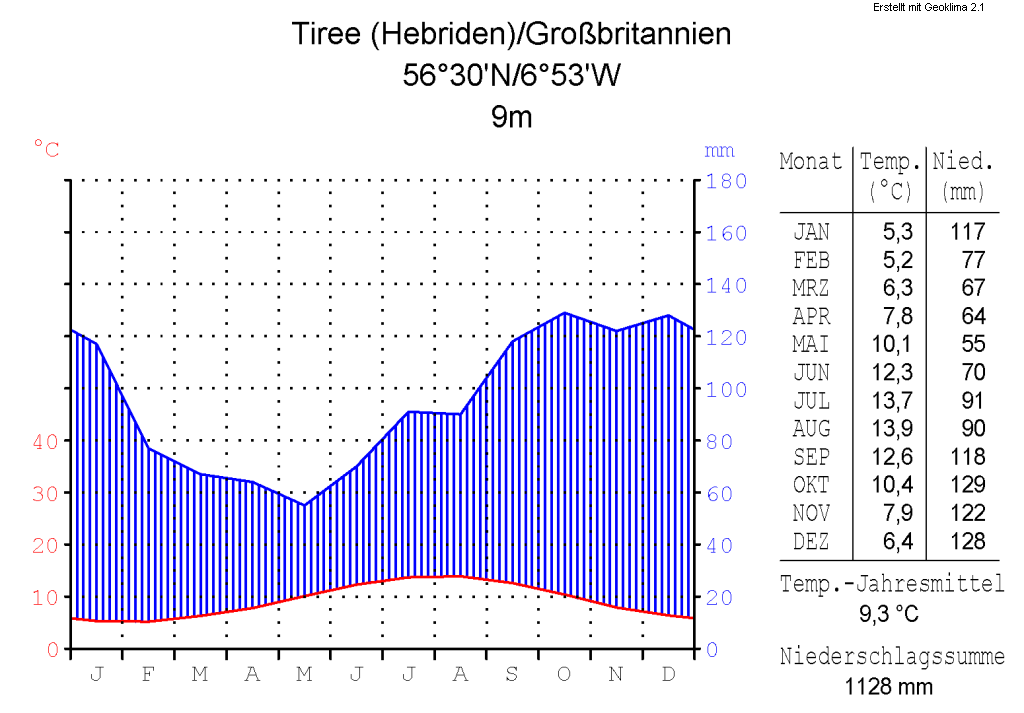
Climate diagram of Tiree

As with the rest of western Scotland, Tiree experiences a maritime climate (Cfb) with cool summers and mild winters. Despite its being on the same latitude as Labrador on the opposite side of the Atlantic Ocean, snow and frost are rare, and short-lived when they occur. Weather data is collected at the island's airport. The lowest temperature to occur in recent years was −5.8 °C (21.6 °F) during the cold spell of December 2010. The extreme maritime moderation contributes to summer temperatures that are far below even coastal locations in continental Europe on similar latitudes. Winter temperatures are similar to those of coastal southern England.

Tiree holds the record for the most hours of sunshine ever recorded in a single month in Scotland, with 329.1 hours in May 1975.

Climate data for Tiree, 9m asl, 1991–2020, Extremes 1951–
Month	Jan	Feb	Mar	Apr	May	Jun	Jul	Aug	Sep	Oct	Nov	Dec	Year
Record high °C (°F)	12.3 (54.1)	12.9 (55.2)	15.2 (59.4)	19.8 (67.6)	23.4 (74.1)	25.0 (77.0)	26.1 (79.0)	25.0 (77.0)	21.2 (70.2)	19.1 (66.4)	14.6 (58.3)	13.2 (55.8)	26.1 (79.0)
Mean daily maximum °C (°F)	8.0 (46.4)	7.9 (46.2)	8.9 (48.0)	10.7 (51.3)	13.1 (55.6)	14.9 (58.8)	16.3 (61.3)	16.6 (61.9)	15.2 (59.4)	12.7 (54.9)	10.2 (50.4)	8.5 (47.3)	11.9 (53.4)
Daily mean °C (°F)	5.9 (42.6)	5.7 (42.3)	6.5 (43.7)	8.0 (46.4)	10.2 (50.4)	12.3 (54.1)	13.8 (56.8)	14.0 (57.2)	12.8 (55.0)	10.4 (50.7)	8.1 (46.6)	6.3 (43.3)	9.5 (49.1)
Mean daily minimum °C (°F)	3.8 (38.8)	3.5 (38.3)	4.2 (39.6)	5.4 (41.7)	7.3 (45.1)	9.7 (49.5)	11.3 (52.3)	11.5 (52.7)	10.3 (50.5)	8.1 (46.6)	5.9 (42.6)	4.2 (39.6)	7.1 (44.8)
Record low °C (°F)	−6.4 (20.5)	−6.1 (21.0)	−4.8 (23.4)	−4.4 (24.1)	−0.3 (31.5)	2.3 (36.1)	5.4 (41.7)	4.9 (40.8)	1.4 (34.5)	−0.3 (31.5)	−3.9 (25.0)	−7 (19)	−7 (19)
Average precipitation mm (inches)	137.2 (5.40)	111.9 (4.41)	92.6 (3.65)	72.4 (2.85)	66.4 (2.61)	68.4 (2.69)	88.4 (3.48)	103.1 (4.06)	104.0 (4.09)	144.2 (5.68)	140.1 (5.52)	146.5 (5.77)	1,275.1 (50.20)
Average precipitation days (≥ 1.0 mm)	20.9	17.1	17.1	12.4	12.8	12.1	14.3	15.4	15.2	19.2	20.6	21.0	198.3
Mean monthly sunshine hours	37.3	71.8	121.8	187.4	240.2	205.3	182.6	171.2	131.9	91.2	48.6	34.8	1,524.2
Source 1: Met Office
Source 2: Royal Dutch Meteorological Institute/KNMI

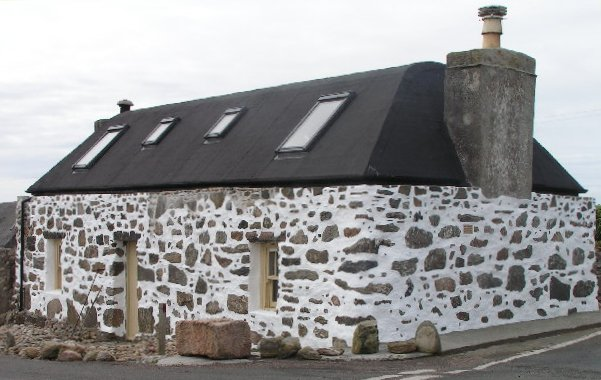
A restored 'spotted house'.

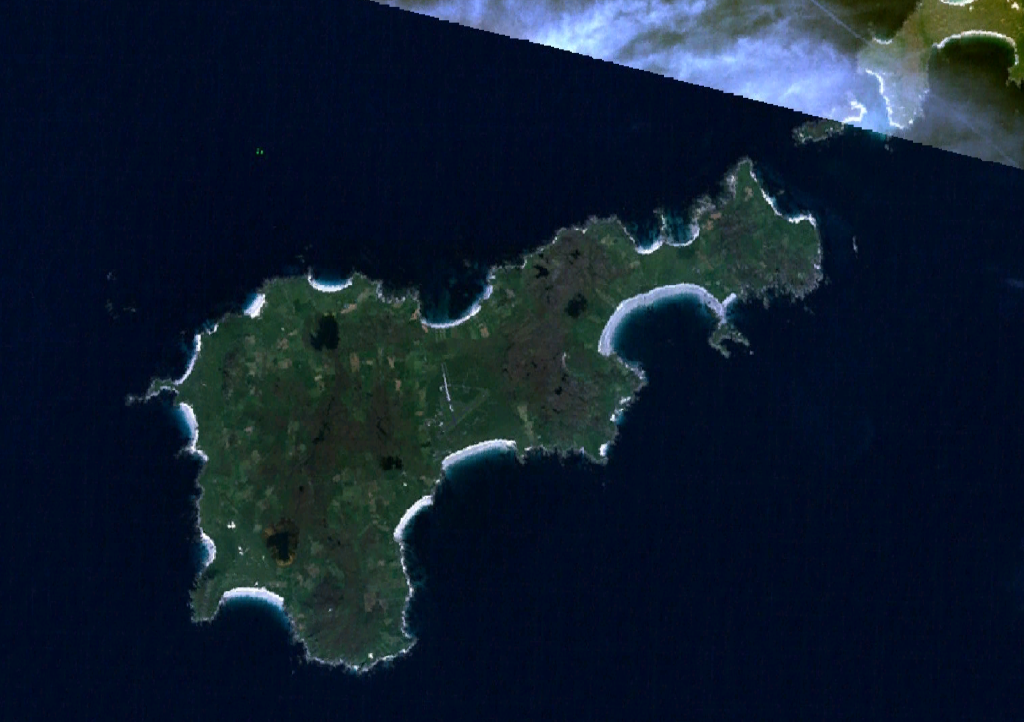
Satellite image of Tiree.

== Economy ==
The Southern Hebrides agency states that "while farming and, to a lesser extent, fishing, continue to provide most of the income of Tiree, tourism plays an increasing part in the island’s economy". The fertile machair lands of the island provide for good quality farming and crofting.

Tiree Community Development Trust owns and operates a 950 kW community-owned wind turbine project known as Tilley. This was the fourth such large-scale project in Scotland. The first three projects were on Gigha and Westray and at Findhorn Ecovillage. The Argyll Array, an offshore wind farm development was proposed for development around Skerryvore but was subsequently abandoned.

The island is a popular destination for family holidays. Tourists are attracted by the beaches, its many crofts, "traditional blackhouses and white houses, many retaining their charming thatched roofs, as well as unique ‘pudding houses’ where white mortar contrasts with dark stone". A full dozen blackhouses, thatched with local marram grass, can still be found on Tiree.

Tiree is popular for windsurfing. The island regularly hosts the Tiree Wave Classic and was the venue for the Corona Extra PWA World Cup Finals in 2007. It is visited regularly by surfing clubs, including Edinburgh, Aberdeen and Glasgow university clubs. There is a radar station which tracks civil aircraft.

The island's population was 653 as recorded by the 2011 census a drop of over 15% since 2001, when there were 770 usual residents. During the same period Scottish island populations as a whole grew by 4% to 103,702. However, in the 2022 census the resident numbers had increased again to 700.

Tiree has a rich distilling history and is home to a distillery, which was set up to re-establish the island's whisky heritage and, as of 2019, is producing Tyree Gin. An April 2020 article about the Tiree Whisky Company, producers of Tyree Gin, stated that it began making gin on the island again in 2019 but did not mention a plan to make whisky on the island. In 2023 it was announced that the distillery had begun production of a Tiree whisky. The first release of single malt whisky was made available for purchase in January 2025. The company is said to be the first legal distillery on the island in over 200 years; distilling had been banned in 1802. In 2020, the company was marketing a Speyside whisky, The Cairnsmuir, but not made on Tiree.

== Culture and media ==
The island is known for its vernacular architecture, including a 'blackhouse' and 'white houses', many retaining their traditional thatched roofs, and for its unique 'pudding houses' or 'spotted houses' where only the mortar is painted white.

Tiree has a declining but still considerable percentage of Gaelic speakers. In 2001, 368 residents (47.8%) spoke Gaelic. By 2011 the figure had decreased to 240 (38.3%), still the highest percentage of speakers in the Inner Hebrides.

Since 2010, the island has hosted the annual Tiree Music Festival, held in Crossapol in the fields beside the community hall 'An Talla'. In 2012, when Tiree appeared in the BBC Programme Coast for a second time, the actions of RAF weather forecasters, flying hazardous missions far out into the storms of the Atlantic during World War II, were discussed.

Tiree is mentioned in the traditional Scottish song titled "Dark Island", which tells a tale of a ship leaving Oban and passing the "isle of my childhood", Tiree. Tiree is mentioned in Enya's 1988 single "Orinoco Flow". Tiree is also referenced in the song "Western Ocean" by Skipinnish, a traditional Scottish band co-founded by local Tirisdeach (Tiresian) Angus MacPhail. Tiree is also mentioned in the song “Calls to Tiree” by Hamish Hawk.

The Tiree Songbook is an album of songs from Na Bàird Thirisdeach, a 20th-century book collecting songs from Tiree, and new compositions about the island. The album won the Community Project of the Year award at the Scots Trad Music Awards in 2017.

== People connected to Tiree ==
- Iain mac Ailein, or John MacLean, (1787-1848), was a Tiree bard and highly important figure in both Scottish Gaelic literature and that of Canadian Gaelic. According to Robert Dunbar, the Gaels of Tiree have a very long history of producing highly gifted songwriters and poets, but "MacLean is ...considered by some to be the greatest of the Tiree bards."
- Leonard Revilliod, grandson of the first Czechoslovak president Tomáš Garrigue Masaryk. He was a pilot in No. 518 Squadron RAF during WW2, engaged in gathering meteorological data vital for military planning, who died in a collision between two aircraft on the island on 16 August 1944 at the age of 22.

== See also ==
- List of islands of Scotland
- List of Sites of Special Scientific Interest in Mull, Coll and Tiree
