= Mansfield, East Ayrshire =

Coordinates: 55.40324°N 4.17616°W

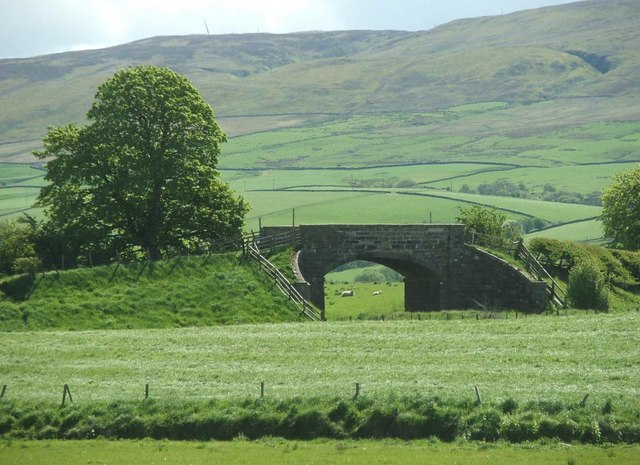
Looking east down Nithsdale from Mansfield

Mansfield is a village in East Ayrshire in Scotland.

It is north of New Cumnock from which it is separated by the River Nith and the adjacent village of Pathhead.
