= Manwood Green =

Hamlet in Essex, England

Coordinates: 51.7887°N 0.2412°E

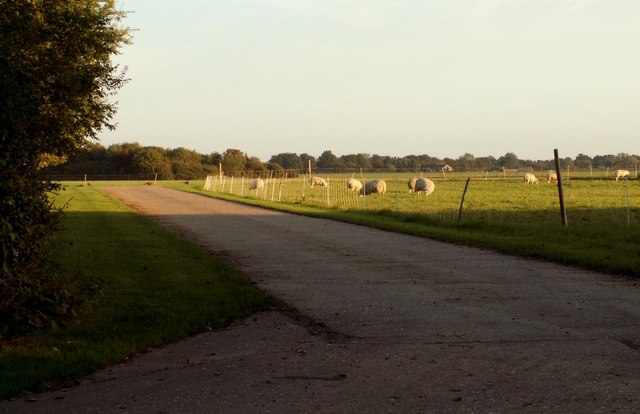
- Little Manwood Farm

- Location within Essex
- Civil parish: Hatfield Heath
- District: Uttlesford
- Shire county: Essex
- Region: East
- Country: England
- Sovereign state: United Kingdom
- Post town: Chelmsford
- Police: Essex
- Fire: Essex
- Ambulance: East of England

Manwood Green is a hamlet in the civil parish of Hatfield Heath, in the Uttlesford district, in the county of Essex, England. Manwood Green was Man(e)wode(s)grene in 1272.

It is on Sparrows Lane (a minor road), approximately 2 km from the A1060 road. The nearest local amenities are situated in the villages of Hatfield Heath, Matching Green and White Roding. Its post town is Chelmsford.
