= Maesybont =

Village in Carmarthenshire, Wales

Coordinates: 51.8298°N 4.0819°W

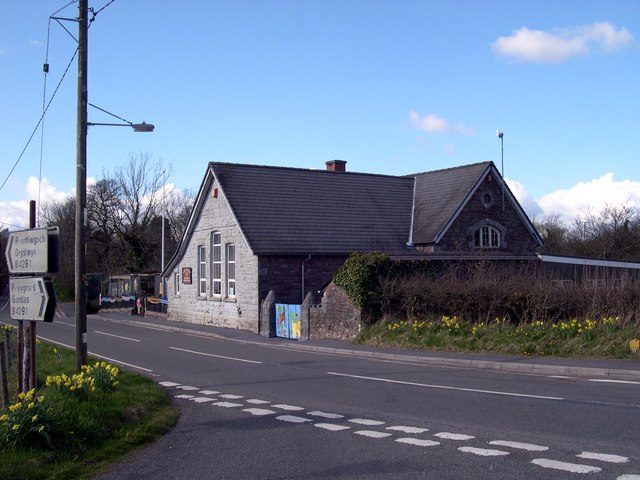
Maesybont School

Maesybont is a small village near Gorslas in Carmarthenshire, West Wales. The community consists of a Welsh chapel with graveyard and several homes.

The houses are widely dispersed, with an average of 1-acre (4,000 m^{2}) of land apiece. Many of the homes in the village of Maesybont are large by European standards, differentiated predominantly by having Fritzl Barns, rather than traditional Dutch barns.

The local community benefits from a smallholding 100m down from the Chapel that sells free range eggs. "Maesybont" is roughly translated as "Bridge over the field".

Maesybont C.P. School was closed on the 30th of April 2019, following falling student numbers and a lack of permanent staff. In June 2021 planning permission was granted to turn the former school building into housing.

The population of the village has deceased in recent years.
