= Macedonia, Glenrothes =

Residential area in Scotland

Macedonia
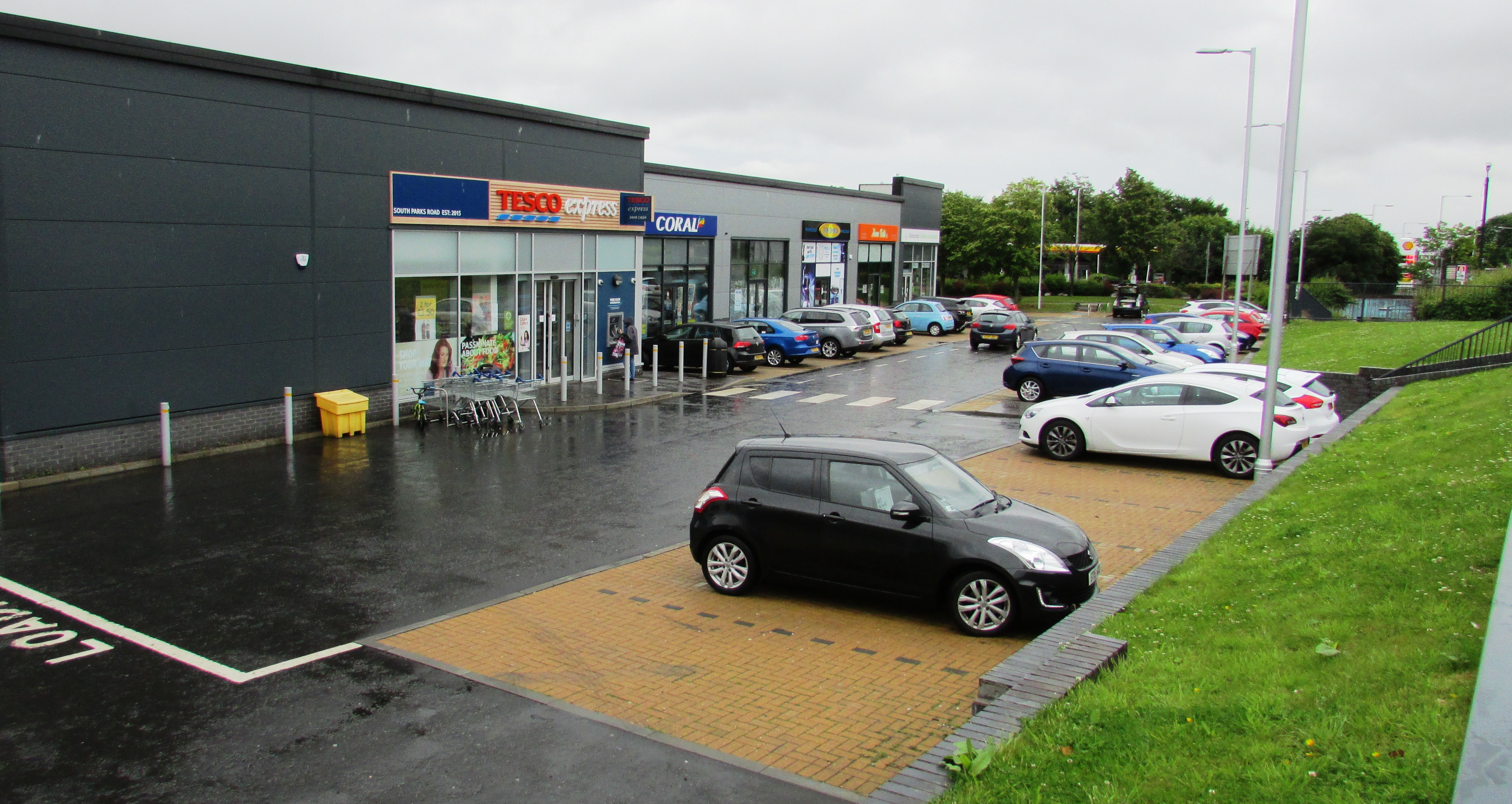
- Shops in the Newbridge Retail Park, Macedonia.
- Population: 2,021
- Country: Scotland
- Sovereign state: United Kingdom
- Postcode district: KY
- Police: Scotland
- Fire: Scottish
- Ambulance: Scottish
- UK Parliament: Glenrothes and Mid Fife
- Scottish Parliament: Mid Fife and Glenrothes

Macedonia is a precinct in Glenrothes, Scotland. Macedonia lies just south of the River Leven and one mile (1.6 km) west of the Kingdom Shopping Centre. According to the 2011 census the data zones of Macedonia West, Macedonia East and Macedonia North have a combined population of 2,021. Its street names are derived from towns, villages and burghs in southern Scotland (e.g., Roxburgh, Ancrum, Ayton, Moffat), while Macedonia itself was named after a farmstead which once stood south of the area. Scottish Index of Multiple Deprivation figures from 2020 indicate that Macedonia falls within the 10–20% most deprived communities in Scotland.

== History ==
Macedonia was developed as a housing estate in the 1960s and features a distinctive Wheel and Spoke design. In its design, the local Southwood Primary School is placed in the centre, with roads running to it from the main road and many footpaths offering alternative access separate from the roads. The designers added an array of features into the housing estate such as porches, wood panelling, and coloured harling, that made it unique compared to other houses in Glenrothes.

The Glenwood centre was the local shopping centre which consisted of ground level commercial units and residential units above. In 2018, Fife council began buying out the units in a new plan for the redevelopment of the then dilapidated shops, the plan came into fruition in July 2023 when the centre was demolished and cleared for the construction of four new blocks of flats, the completion date of which is to be confirmed.
