= Mayländer =

Mayländer is a surname. Notable people with the surname include:

- Bernd Mayländer (born 1971), German racing driver
- Karl Mayländer (1872–early 1940s), Austrian Jewish businessman and art collector murdered in the Holocaust
