= Llanllwchaiarn, Ceredigion =

Community in Ceredigion, Wales

Coordinates: 52°11′35″N 4°21′11″W

Llanllwchaiarn
- Community
- Principal area: Ceredigion
- Country: Wales
- Sovereign state: United Kingdom
- Police: Dyfed-Powys
- Fire: Mid and West Wales
- Ambulance: Welsh
- List of places UK Wales Ceredigion Community map: Map of the community

Llanllwchaiarn (Welsh: Llanllwchaearn) is a community in Ceredigion, Wales, surrounding New Quay and had a population of 848 at the 2011 UK census.

The community council uses the spelling of Llanllwchaearn, which differs from Llanllwchaiarn shown on Ordnance Survey Explorer map 198.

== History ==
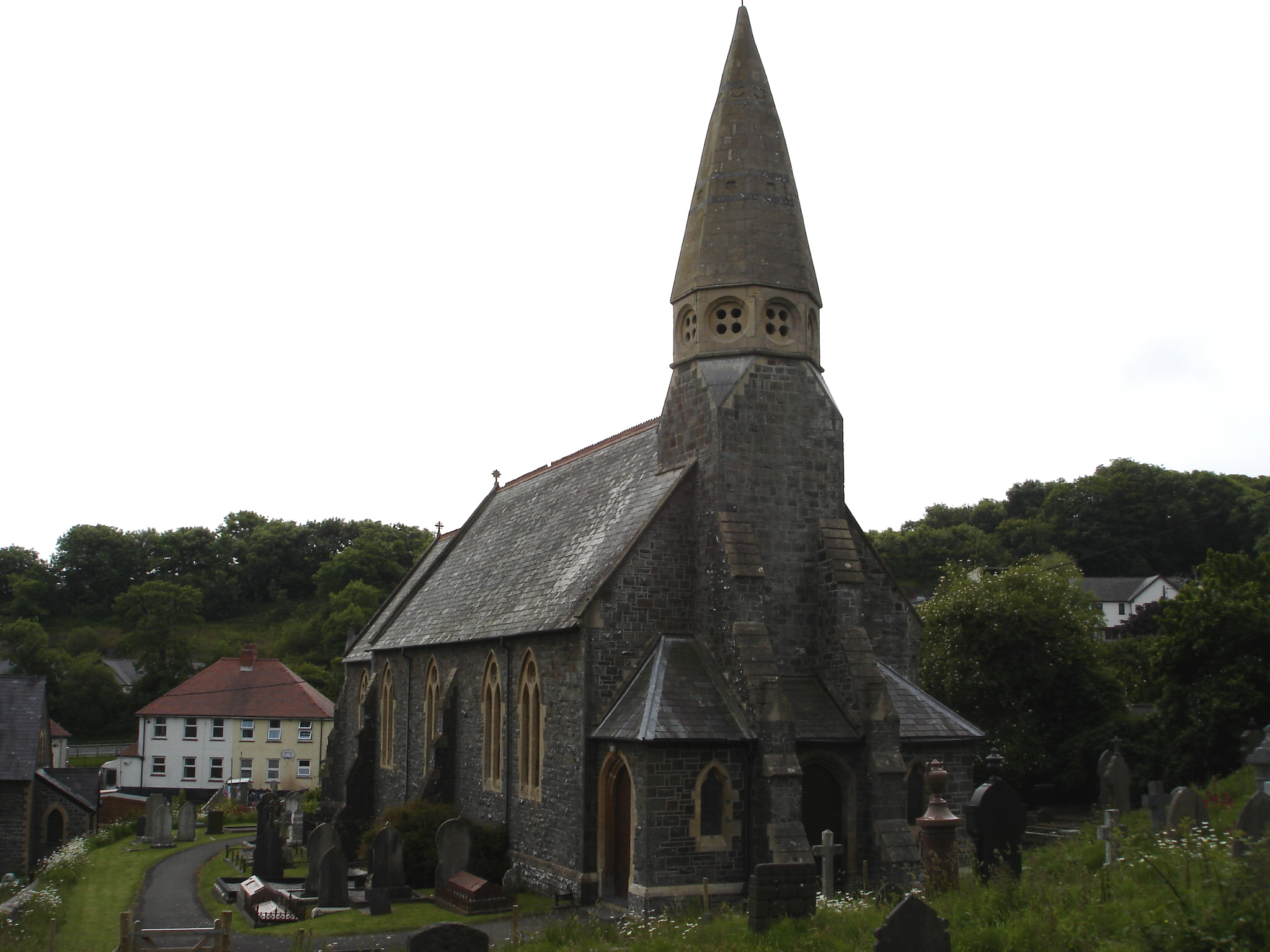
St Llwchaiarn's Church, the parish church, now in the community of New Quay

Llanllwchaiarn was an ancient parish. The parish included the area where the new town of New Quay was developed from the 1830s onwards. A New Quay local government district was created in 1869, covering New Quay plus the old village of Llanllwchaiarn around the parish church, but excluding the more rural parts of the parish. Such local government districts were converted into urban districts under the Local Government Act 1894. The 1894 Act also directed that parishes could no longer straddle district boundaries, and so a new civil parish of New Quay was created matching the urban district, and the parish of Llanllwchaiarn was reduced to just cover the parts outside the urban district, despite Llanllwchaiarn village itself being within the New Quay urban district and parish.

As part of wider local government reforms in 1974, rural parishes in Wales were redesignated as communities, and so the pre-1974 Llanllwchaiarn parish (i.e. as had been reduced in 1894 to exclude the parts in New Quay urban district) became a community.
