= Mannal =

Hamlet on the Isle of Tiree, Scotland

Coordinates: 56.4599°N 6.8928°W

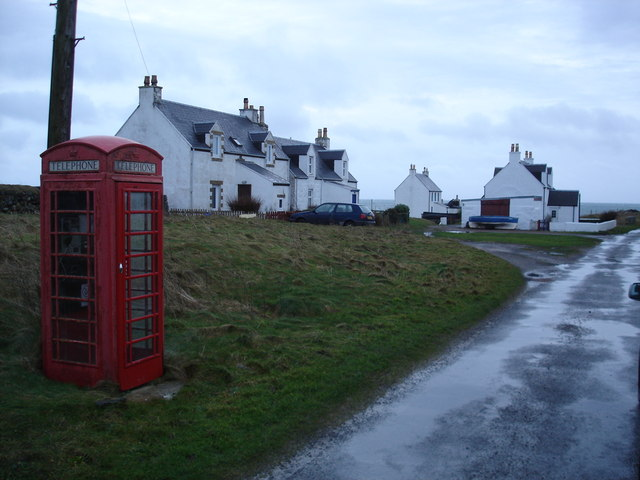
- Houses in Mannal, adjacent to the coast

- Location within Argyll and Bute
- OS grid reference: NL9840
- Council area: Argyll and Bute
- Lieutenancy area: Argyll and Bute
- Country: Scotland
- Sovereign state: United Kingdom
- Post town: ISLE OF TIREE
- Postcode district: PA77
- Police: Scotland
- Fire: Scottish
- Ambulance: Scottish
- UK Parliament: Argyll, Bute and South Lochaber
- Scottish Parliament: Argyll and Bute

Mannal is a coastal hamlet on the west side of Hynish Bay, on the island of Tiree, Scotland. The township of Mannal lies on the southwest corner of Tiree at the southern end of Hynish Bay between Hynish and Balemartine. Tiree is the most westerly island in the Inner Hebrides which lie off the west coast of Scotland.
