= Manor Parsley =

Coordinates: 50.272°N 5.218°W

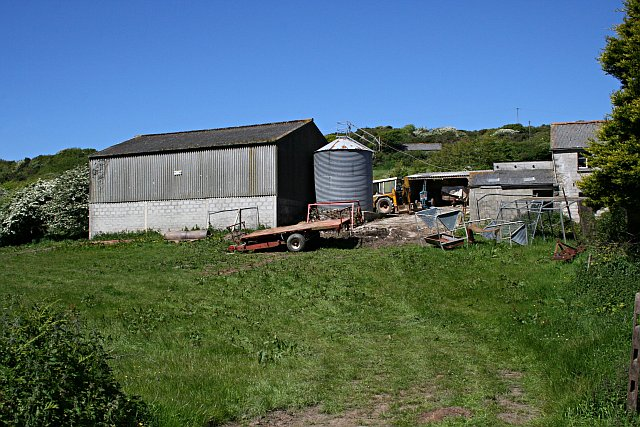
- Farm buildings near Manor Parsley

- Location within Cornwall
- OS grid reference: SW708463
- Civil parish: St Agnes
- Unitary authority: Cornwall
- Ceremonial county: Cornwall
- Region: South West
- Country: England
- Sovereign state: United Kingdom

Manor Parsley is a hamlet near Mount Hawke in Cornwall, England, UK. Manor Parsley is approximately 2 miles (3.2 km) north of Redruth.
