= Manhay, Cornwall =

Coordinates: 50.127°N 5.231°W

Manhay
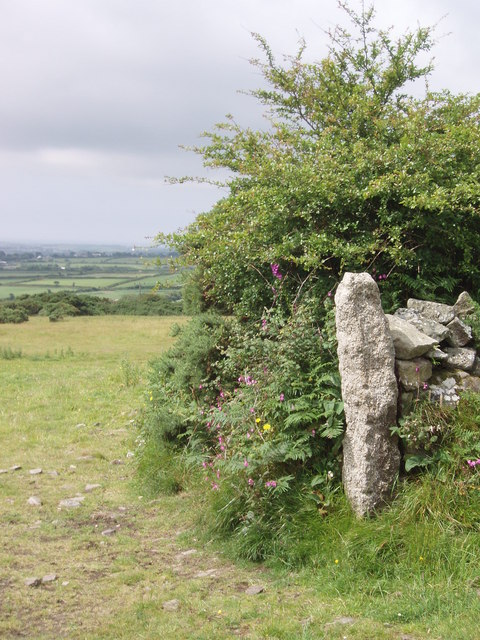
- View from Manhay Beacon

- Location within Cornwall
- OS grid reference: SW692302
- Civil parish: Wendron
- Unitary authority: Cornwall
- Ceremonial county: Cornwall
- Region: South West
- Country: England
- Sovereign state: United Kingdom
- Post town: Helston
- Postcode district: TR13 0

Manhay is a hamlet in the parish of Wendron (where the population at the 2011 census was included.) in south Cornwall, England, UK. Manhay is approximately 12 miles (19 km) east of Penzance.
