= RAF Stornoway =

British airbase in Scotland (1941–1945; 1982–1998)

Royal Air Force Station Stornoway
- Stornoway, Isle of Lewis, Outer Hebrides in Scotland, United Kingdom
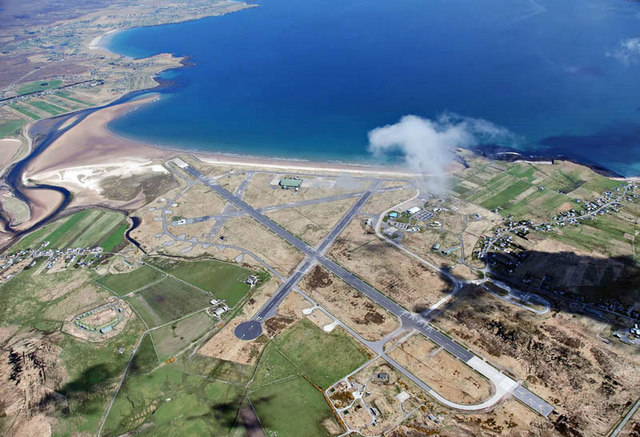
- Aerial view of the former RAF Stornoway airfield, April 2008

Site information
- Type: Royal Air Force flying station (former)
- Code: USAAF Station 573
- Owner: Ministry of Defence
- Operator: Royal Air Force
- Condition: closed

Location
- Location in Outer Hebrides RAF Stornoway (the United Kingdom)
- Coordinates: 58°13′07″N 006°19′53″W

Site history
- Built: 1940; 86 years ago
- In use: 1 April 1940 – 1945; 1982 – 31 March 1998
- Fate: transferred to Highlands and Islands Council for civilian use, became Stornoway Airport
- Battles/wars: European theatre of World War II; Cold War

Airfield information
- Identifiers: IATA: SYY, ICAO: EGPO, WMO: 03026
- Elevation: 26 feet (8 m) AMSL
Runways
Direction	Length and surface
18/36	2,315 metres (7,595 ft) asphalt
06/24	1,000 metres (3,281 ft) asphalt
~~??/??~~	?,??? metres ~~asphalt~~
~~??/??~~	??? metres ~~asphalt~~

Royal Air Force Station Stornoway, more commonly known as RAF Stornoway is a former Royal Air Force station and aerodrome near the town of Stornoway, on the Isle of Lewis, in the Western Isles of Scotland, operating from 1940 to 1945, and subsequently from 1982 to 1998. Its motto was 'Lead and Guide'. The airfield remains in use by the civilian Stornoway Airport.

== History ==
=== Beginnings ===
Prior to the modern military facility, the airfield was originally developed during the 1930s; consisting of grass runways on the site of Melbost Golf Links, cited to have been the first grass runways in Britain. Limited civilian flights started May 1940 on the Glasgow to Hebrides by Scottish Airways using a de Havilland Rapide, though with the start of Second World War, the Air Ministry acquired the site. RAF Stornoway started development by laying four new paved runways in an 'unusual layout' for RAF Coastal Command, completed by 1941. It was home to various Coastal Command squadrons patrolling the North Atlantic for U-boats. In late 1940, a detachment of Avro Anson aircraft arrived from No. 612 (County of Aberdeen) Squadron RAF, Royal Auxiliary Air Force (RAuxF). The Ansons operated from the site of RAF Stornoway whilst it was still under construction. By November 1940, the aircraft from 612 Squadron had been posted to RAF Wick in north-east Scotland, and were gradually replaced by Ansons from No. 48 Squadron RAF, then based at RAF Hooton Park.

In March 1940, 827 Naval Air Squadron of the Fleet Air Arm operated Fairey Albacore aircraft from Stornoway in conjunction with the Ansons of 48 Squadron RAF on maritime patrols across the Atlantic Ocean. This continued until the station was completed, at which point they moved away. RAF Stornoway was officially constituted on 1 April 1941; 85 years ago, as part of No. 15 (Reconnaissance) Group RAF, and then No. 18 (Reconnaissance) Group, both of RAF Coastal Command, but was finally closed at the end of the Second World War when it was transferred to the Ministry of Civil Aviation on 1 July 1946, reverting to Stornoway Airport. No. 66 Air-Sea Rescue (ASR) Marine Craft Unit was also based at Stornoway Harbour during 1943 and 1944.

=== Post War ===
In 1952, biological agents were brought in to the airport for the controversial Operation Cauldron. They were testing the dangerous agents on caged monkeys and guinea pigs who were situated on a navy pontoon nearby at the isthmus (Am Bràighe in Gaelic) connecting the Eye Peninsula. The tests were carried out by scientists from the Chemical and Biological Defence Establishment (CBDE) from Porton Down. When a trawler inadvertently passed through one of the clouds of plague bacteria, the ship and crew were temporarily put under covert surveillance during their return from Iceland to Blackpool and onshore.

=== Cold War ===
During the height of the Cold War years, Stornoway Airport was home to No. 112 Signals Unit RAF that was established in 1960 as an electronic countermeasures (ECM) measurement and evaluation unit by RAF Bomber Command Headquarters (HQBC), based at RAF High Wycombe. The unit measured the signal strength, frequency bandwidths, and aerial performance of the operational Handley Page Victor and Avro Vulcan V bombers, as they flew a course towards, over or away from the unit varying from straight-lines to polar patterns. Results were passed back to the Operations Research Branch, (HQBC), Bomber Command Development Unit (BCDU) at RAF Finningley, and each aircraft's base for the electronics engineers and technicians to review for performance improvement of each piece of equipment that was measured. The combined success of 112 S.U., BCDU at RAF Finningley, and each of the aircraft's bases, along with the Operations Research Branch at (HQBC) and technical support from RRE Malvern (later to become RSRE Malvern) was demonstrated by the V-force during the Operation Skyshield exercises and readiness through the Cuban Missile Crisis in the early sixties, and subsequent exercises until the time the unit was closed in 1983.

In the early 1980s, part of the airport was upgraded in a £40 million programme consisting of extensions of the main runway and taxiways, along with new hangars, designed to accept RAF Panavia Tornado aircraft. By 1 April 1982, this work was completed, the buildings commissioned, and RAF Stornoway was established once again in order to become a forward operations base (FOB). After sixteen years in this role, and also the end of the Cold War, the RAF station was finally closed on 31 March 1998. The Ministry of Defence sold the site to the Western Isles Council, and the aerodrome reverted to civilian use, again becoming Stornoway Airport.

Following this, some of the technical and administrative buildings were further sold, one becoming a Christian school, whilst others including the Nissen hut accommodation blocks were demolished. The runway remains in use as part of Stornoway Airport, and other parts of the site are used as a ground for holding stunt shows and vehicle exhibitions.

Stornoway Airport is still used by the MoD (UK) and NATO for military exercises.

== Units ==
RAF Stornoway units
squadron	aircraft operated	date from	date to	moved to	notes
No. 48 Squadron RAF	Avro Anson I Bristol Beaufort I Lockheed Hudson V/III	16 Jul 1940	3 Aug 1941	RAF Stornoway	as a detachment from RAF Hooton Park
No. 48 Squadron RAF	Avro Anson I Bristol Beaufort I Lockheed Hudson V/III	3 Aug 1941	20 Oct 1941	RAF Skitten	detachments at RAF Aldergrove and RAF Limavady
No. 58 Squadron RAF	Armstrong Whitworth Whitley V/VII	30 Aug 1942	2 Dec 1942	RAF Holmsley South	
No. 58 Squadron RAF	Handley Page Halifax II/III	1 Sep 1944	25 May 1945	disbanded	
No. 206 Squadron RAF					
No. 224 Squadron RAF	Lockheed Hudson III/V	19 Feb 1942	16 Apr 1942	RAF Tiree	as a detachment from RAF Limavady
No. 500 Squadron RAF	Lockheed Hudson V	22 Mar 1942	30 Aug 1942	RAF St Eval	
No. 502 Squadron RAF	Handley Page Halifax II/III	14 Sep 1944	25 May 1945	disbanded	
No. 518 Squadron RAF	Handley Page Halifax V	6 Jul 1943	25 Sep 1943	RAF Tiree	
No. 612 Squadron RAF	Avro Anson I	Jun 1939	Nov 1940	RAF Wick	as a detachment from RAF Dyce
825 Naval Air Squadron					
827 Naval Air Squadron					
842 Naval Air Squadron					
1840 Naval Air Squadron					

The following units were also here at some point:

- No. 303 Ferry Training Unit RAF (December 1942 - March 1943)
- Detachment of No. 1693 (General Reconnaissance) Flight RAF (August 1944 - ????)

== RAF Stornoway in fiction ==
RAF Stornoway is featured in the Tom Clancy novel, Red Storm Rising, as a base for RAF operations over the North Atlantic and against Soviet-held Iceland. Later the displaced carrier air wing from USS Nimitz is based there after the carrier sustains battle damage. It also mentioned in passing in Katherine Kurtz's Death of an Adept.

== See also ==
- Electronic warfare
