= Mailand, Shetland =

Coordinates: 60.69483°N 0.89569°W

Mailand is a hamlet in the Shetland Islands.

It is on the island of Unst, the northernmost of the inhabited British Isles, near its southern coast.
