= List of Royal Air Force ground trades =

This is a list of Royal Air Force ground trades. All Royal Air Force (RAF) enlisted airmen of each ground trade in the RAF are currently assigned into a numbered Trade Group (TG), under which it operates for administrative command and control.

Originally, ground trades in the RAF were organised by specialisms into groups numbering I, II, III, IV, and V, along with M for any medical associated trades. They were subsequently changed into numerical Trade Groups (TG), one of the earliest mentions was the creation of Trade Group 9 for the trade of Firefighter on 31 December 1943 as part of the newly created RAF Fire Service. By 1951, the Royal Air Force had established twenty-two official Trade Groups, as shown below. The total number of Trade Groups have since undergone amalgamation into nineteen groups in 1964, and down to eighteen TGs by the early 2000s. With further subsequent amalgamations, only seventeen of the original Trade Groups existed until 2022, when branch and trade was discontinued as an identifier, with personnel being allocated to professions instead.

It is important to distinguish that all enlisted personnel (also known as 'Other Ranks') in the RAF were assigned to a Trade Group; whereas commissioned officers in the RAF belonged to an RAF Branch (not to be confused with a service branch).

== RAF Trade Groups and trades ==
Royal Air Force (RAF) Trade Groups (TG) and their allocated ground trades up to 2022
Trade Group	trade(s), official abbreviation(s)	notes, reference(s)
TG1	Aircraft Maintenance Mechanic (Avionics) (AMM (Av) CQ, AMM (Av) UQ), Aircraft Maintenance Mechanic (Mechanical) (AMM (M) CQ, AMM (M) UQ), Weapon Technician (CQ, UQ)	Specifically for aircraft technicians (and aircraft engineering technicians), the original TG1 trade was known as 'Airframe fitter', and subsequently expanded to include: Aircraft Engineering Technician (Airframe) (Eng Tech A), Aircraft Engineering Technician (Propulsion) (Eng Tech P), Aircraft Engineering Technician (Weapons) (Eng Tech W), Aircraft Technician (Mechanics) (A Tech (M)), and Aircraft Technician (Avionics) (A Tech (AV)). It was further subsequently rationalised to Aircraft Maintenance Mechanics (Avionics) (Civilian Qualified or Unqualified), Aircraft Maintenance Mechanics (Mechanical) (Civilian Qualified or Unqualified), and Weapon Technicians (Civilian Qualified or Unqualified).
TG2	no longer assigned	Originally for aircraft electrical engineering technicians, included Eng Tech AV and Eng Tech AE. Following a decision on 1 April 2003, TG2 was amalgamated into TG1, making one combined Aircraft Engineering Trade Group completed by 31 March 2009.
TG3	no longer assigned	Electronic Tech Air defence) was in TG3. In the mid 90s LTech TC, AF & AD amalgamated into a single trade - Eng Tech El.TG3 was amalgamated with TG11 to form the new Communications Trade Group 4
TG4	Information and Communication Technician Aerial Erector, Information and Communication Technology Technician (CQ, UQ)	TG4 formerly encompassed Telecommunications, and Communications and Information Systems (CIS) trades, specifically, TCC/TCO, and CIS AL Erect
TG5	General Technician (Mechanical) (CQ, UQ), General Technician (Electrical) (CQ, UQ), General Technician Workshops (CQ, UQ)	Originally for all non-aircraft engineering, TG5 formerly included General Technician Electronics (Gen Tech E), General Technician Ground Support Equipment (Gen Tech GSE), General Technician Workshops (Gen Tech WS), and General Technician (Mechanical) (Gen Tech (M)); dependent on size, these trades formed the station General Engineering Flight (GEF) or General Engineering Section (GES). They were subsequently rationalised to their current trades.
TG6	Logistics Driver	TG6 was originally known as the Mechanical Transport (MT) group with Mechanical Transport Driver (MTD), located on station at Mechanical Transport Flight (or Mechanical Transport Section); it also formerly included Mechanical Transport Mechanic (MT Mech), Mechanical Transport Technician (MT Tech) (at Mechanical Transport Servicing Flight or Mechanical Transport Servicing Section) before amalgamation with TG5 of General Engineering Flight (GEF).
TG7	Air and Space Operations Specialist / Non-Commissioned Controller (NCC)	The administrative merge of TGs 9 and 12. With effect from 1 April 2019, TG9 becomes Air and Space Operations Specialist (Flight Operations), and TG12, Air and Space Operations Specialist (Aerospace Systems). TG7 NCC was formed from the transfer of TG9 and TG12 NCO controllers with effect from 1 April 2018.
TG8	Firefighter, Gunner, (Note: Since inception in 1942, the Royal Air Force Regiment was not open to women (male only). This has now changed by Prime Ministerial decision as of July 2016. Females were scheduled to be combat service ready by 2018.); RAF Police	TG8 is the Force Protection group. Firefighters and RAF Regiment Gunners were transferred to TG8 from TG22 in 1976. In the same year, RAF Firefighters were separated from the Regiment Command Structure and became a separate trade.
TG9	Flight Operations Assistant	From the start of 1944, TG9 was originally for Firefighters, but on 7 October 1959 it was reassigned to Air Traffic Control when Firefighters were moved to TG22 to become RAF Regiment Firefighters. Now regrouped to TG7: Air and Space Operations Specialist (Flight Operations).
TG10	Physical Training Instructor (PTI)	
TG11	Intelligence Analyst, Intelligence Analyst (Voice)	Originally: Telecommunications Operator (TCO), subsequently INT AN(C) and INT AN(V), it merged into TG4.
TG12	Aerospace Systems Operator (ASOp)	Originally ASMOP/SNCO FC. Now TG7: Air and Space Operations Specialist (Aerospace Systems).
TG13	Survival Equipment Technician	Trade name changed from Survival Equipment Fitter (SE Fitt) in 2019, TG13 also formerly included Painter and Finisher (PTR/FNR).
TG14	Air Photography Operator (APOp), Air Camera Fitter (ACFitt), Photographic Processing Analyst (PPA), Plotter Air Photographer (PAP), Air Cartographer (Air Cart), Photographer (PhotoG)	TG14 also formerly included INT AN(I).
TG15	Biomedical Scientist, Environmental Health Technician, Operating Department Practitioner, Pharmacy Technician, Radiographer, RAF Medic, Registered Nurse (Adult), Registered Nurse (Mental Health), Student Nurse (Adult)	Medical trade group traditionally located in the Station Medical Centre, TG15 trade titles formerly included: Staff Nurse (RMN), PH Tech, EH Tech, OT Tech, Radiog, Lab Tech, Med Admin, Med Asst, and Staff Nurse (RGN).
TG16	Dental Hygienist, Dental Nurse, Dental Technician	Dental trade group.
TG17	Personnel Support	Originally known as Personnel and Administration Clerk (P&A Clerk) and subsequently Personnel Administration (Pers Admin), located on station at Personnel and Support Flight (PSF) or Personnel and Support Section (PSS) typically within Station Headquarters (SHQ). TG17 previously also included Data / Statistics Analyst (Data/Stat An).
TG18	Logistics Mover, Logistics Supplier	Logistics Supplier was originally known as 'supplier' and was subsequently retitled 'Logistics (Support)', and Logistics Mover was originally known as Movs Cont/Op.
TG19	Logistics Caterer (CQ, UQ), Logistics Chef (CQ, UQ)	Traditionally forming Catering Flight, trade names originally included: Chef, Cook, Catering Accountant (Cat Acct), Mess Manager, and Steward.
TG20	no longer assigned	
TG21	Musician	
TG22	no longer assigned	TG22 was the original Royal Air Force Regiment group, and included RAF Regiment Gunner and RAF Regiment Firefighter; in 1976 these moved to TG8 (with Firefighter no longer part of RAF Regiment) along with the RAF Police.
