= Balfarg =

Neolithic henge monument in Scotland

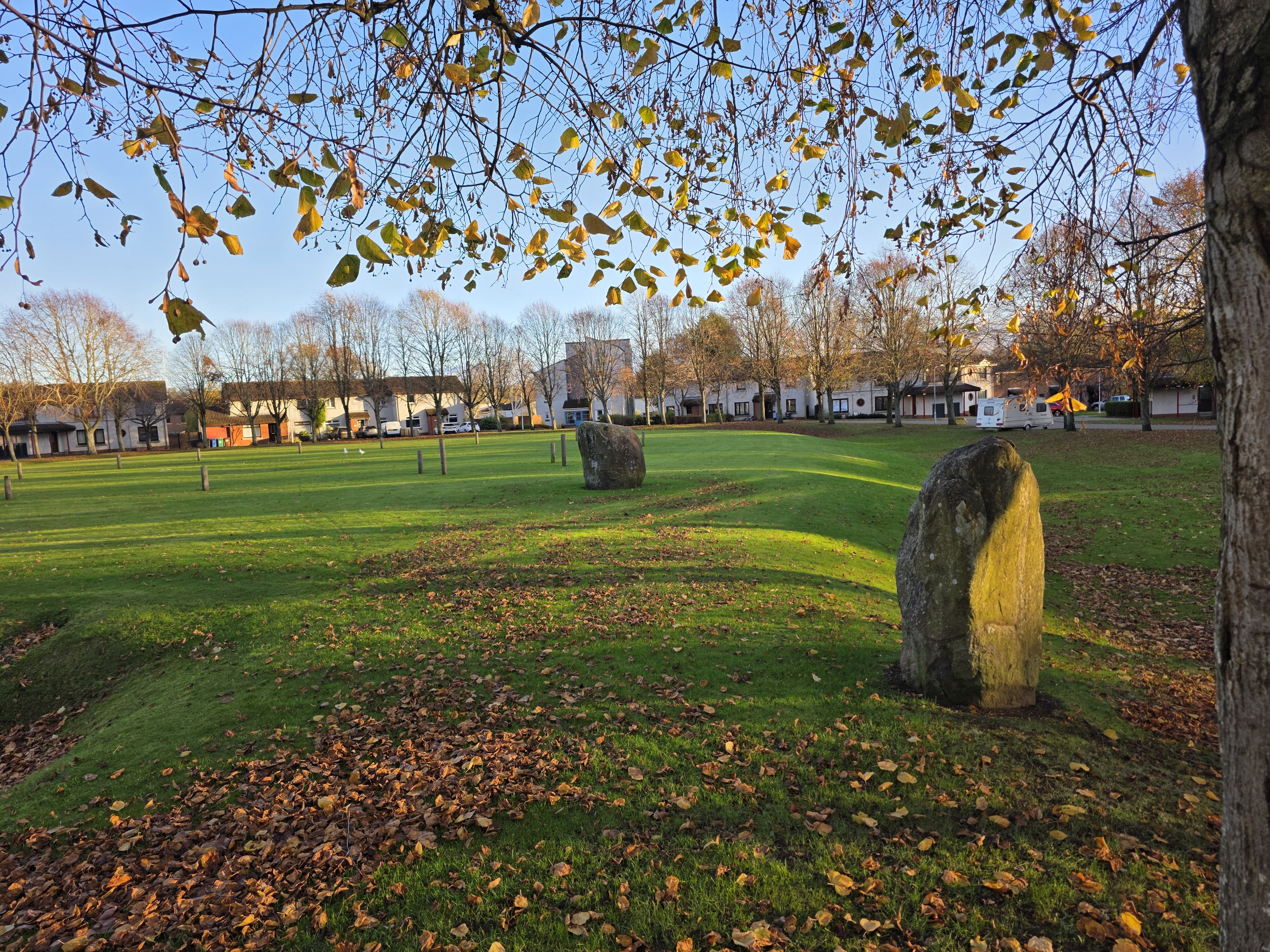
- The Henge, Balfarg
- Interactive map of Balfarg
- 56.21527°N 3.15926°W
- Location: Glenrothes, Fife, Scotland
- OS grid reference: NO 28200 03126

Site notes
- Public access: Yes

Scheduled monument
- Official name: Balfarg Farmhouse, henge & standing stones 280m WSW of
- Designated: 21 December 1951
- Reference no.: SM2184

Balfarg is a prehistoric monument complex in Glenrothes, Fife, Scotland. It is protected as a scheduled monument. With the development of Glenrothes new town in the latter half of the 20th Century an adjacent residential area was developed around the complex carrying the same name.

== Balfarg Henge ==
The Balfarg henge, located at grid reference NO282031, is part of a larger prehistoric ceremonial complex. It contains the remnants of a stone circle which has been partly reconstructed.

The Balfarg henge was excavated between 1977 and 1978 by Roger Mercer prior to the development of a new housing estate, work which established that the two extant standing stones were part of a circle that stood within the henge. The two surviving specimens lined the north-west oriented entrance to the henge.

Within the 64.9 metres (213 ft) diameter henge were found broken Neolithic pottery, burnt wood and bone which had been dumped on the site prior to the erection of a 25 metres (82 ft) wide timber circle of 16 wooden posts. Two especially large portal timbers stood on the west side of the circle. It is likely that the henge was built after these phases of activity. Grooved ware pottery found in the postholes dates to around 2900 BC. Some of the vessels may have been used to hold black henbane (Hyoscyamus niger) which is a poison but also a powerful hallucinogen.

Five further concentric post rings had also been erected outside and inside the main wooden circle although these were made from narrower timbers and may have supported hurdling or a palisade.

Later during the site's use the timber circle was replaced by two concentric stone circles, again with an entrance to the west and some time after this the henge was constructed. Around 1900 BC a pit was dug in the centre of the stone circles and in it was placed the body of a young man along with a flint knife and a handled beaker.

Later excavation between 1983 and 1985 by Barclay and Russell-White demonstrated that there were scatters of earlier Neolithic pits round the Balfarg henge. These excavations also discovered a second henge, which surrounded a Neolithic timber mortuary enclosure. A second such timber structure lay just outside the henge, partly overlain by a complex of two burial cairns.

Nearby is the Balbirnie Stone Circle, which is also part of the complex.

== Balfarg housing estate ==
The Balfarg Henge now serves as a centre piece greenspace for the local area with modern housing developed in crescents around the monument. A modern residential area which was started in the late 1970s and was later expanded over subsequent decades now surrounding the henge. Former traditional steadings and farm buildings within the area have also since been converted into housing and now form part of the larger modern estate. The streets in the original parts of the estate developed by the former Glenrothes Development Corporation were named after lochs in Scotland, for instance Affric Road and Tummel Road.

The Gilvenbank Hotel, Bar and Restaurant (formerly Jaguars (1982 to 1988) and The Snooty Fox (1988 to 2006)) is also located in the area close to Gilvenbank Park. Located adjacent to the hotel is the Balfarg care home. In 1995 a tradition left Balfarg when the local fete moved from the henge to nearby Gilvenbank Park. The Coul burn flows southeast through Balfarg on to Balbirnie Park and then joins the River Leven further east near Windygates.

Buses run every twenty minutes to and from Balfarg and the Kingdom Shopping Centre in Glenrothes town centre. The area is in the catchment of Pitcoudie Primary and St Pauls Roman Catholic Primary schools. High Schools Glenwood and Glenrothes High and St Andrews RC in Kirkcaldy have students from the area.

== See also ==
- Pitcairn House
- Balbirnie House
- Scheduled monuments in Fife
