= 2003 Fife Council election =

← 1999	1 May 2003	2007 →

All 78 seats to Fife Council 40 seats needed for a majority
	First party	Second party	Third party
Leader	Anne McGovern
Party	Labour	Liberal Democrats	SNP
Leader's seat	The Lochs
Last election	43	21	9
Seats before	38	21	11
Seats won	36	23	11
Seat change	▼2	▲2	0
Popular vote	41,738	31,679	26,107
Percentage	33.2%	25.2%	20.8%
	Fourth party	Fifth party
Party	Independent	Conservative
Leader's seat		Inverkeithing and Dalgety Bay
Last election	4	1
Seats before	3	2
Seats won	6	2
Seat change	▲3	0
Popular vote	11,143	12,951
Percentage	8.9%	10.3%
- Results by ward.
Council Leader before election
Christine May
Labour
Council Leader after election
Anne McGovern
Labour

2003 Elections to Fife Council were held on 1 May 2003, the same day as the other Scottish local government elections and the Scottish Parliament election. The election was the last one to use plurality (first past the post) system of election to elect the 78 individual councillors.

== Party performance ==
Labour continued to control the council as a minority, having only 38 seats going into the election. Labour won 43 seats in 1999 elections but lost 5 seats in by-elections during the course of their term in office, but remained having the largest share of the vote and in numbers of councillors. SNP, Liberal Democrats and independents all increased their share of the vote and number of councillors.

2003 Fife Council election
← 1999	3 May 2003	2007 →

All 78 seats to Fife Council 40 seats needed for a majority
- Turnout: -->
	First party	Second party	Third party
Leader	Anne McGovern
Party	Labour	Liberal Democrats	SNP
Leader's seat	The Lochs
Last election	43	21	9
Seats before	38	21	11
Seats won	36	23	11
Seat change	▼2	▲2	0
Popular vote	41,738	31,679	26,107
Percentage	33.2%	25.2%	20.8%
	Fourth party	Fifth party
Party	Independent	Conservative
Leader's seat		Inverkeithing and Dalgety Bay
Last election	4	1
Seats before	3	2
Seats won	5	2
Seat change	▲2	0
Popular vote	11,143	12,951
Percentage	8.9%	10.3%
- Results by ward.
Council Leader before election
Christine May
Labour
Council Leader after election
Anne McGovern
Labour

== Election results ==
Fife local election result 2003
Party	Seats	Gains	Losses	Net gain/loss	Seats %	Votes %	Votes	+/−
Labour	36		7		46.2	33.3	41,698	
Liberal Democrats	23	2			29.5	25.2	31,609	
SNP	11	3			14.1	20.8	26,037	
Independent	6	4			6.4	8.9	11,143	
Conservative	2				2.6	10.3	12,951	
Scottish Socialist	0				0.0	1.5	1,936	
UKIP	0				0.0	0.0	23	

Turnout was 46.2%

== Ward results ==
In Order of the ward numbers:

=== Wards no1: Kincardine, Culross and Low Valleyfield ===
Kincardine, Culross and Low Valleyfield
Party	Candidate	Votes	%
Independent	William Ferguson	1,192	
Labour	Timothy J. Collins	266	
SNP	Ian M. Chisholm	185	
Liberal Democrats	Jane-Anne Shaw	58	

=== Blairhall, High Valleyfield and Torryburn ===
Blairhall, High Valleyfield and Torryburn
Party	Candidate	Votes	%
Labour	Annie R. McGovern	764	
Independent	Sandra Daly	733	
SNP	William Miller	208	
Liberal Democrats	Jane Utting	116	

=== Oakley, Saline and Steelend ===
Oakley, Saline and Steelend
Party	Candidate	Votes	%
Labour	Theresa Gunn	721	
SNP	Brian Clark	489	
Liberal Democrats	William M. Mackay	284	

=== Cairneyhill, Carnock and Milesmark ===
Cairneyhill, Carnock and Milesmark
Party	Candidate	Votes	%
Labour	Alan C. Kenney	761	
Liberal Democrats	Anne W. O'Brien	555	
SNP	Stephen R. Hossack	443	

=== Crossford and Dunfermline Central ===
Crossford and Dunfermline Central
Party	Candidate	Votes	%
Liberal Democrats	James P. Simpson	1,219	
Labour	Veronica T. Collins	253	
SNP	Andrew J. Lyst	214	

=== Baldridgeburn ===
Baldridgeburn
Party	Candidate	Votes	%
Labour	Andrew Brown	643	
Liberal Democrats	James Burke	558	
SNP	Grant W. Carradine	378	

=== Wellwood and Headwell ===
Wellwood and Headwell
Party	Candidate	Votes	%
Labour	Drew Edward	796	
SNP	Alastair I. Stewart	435	
Liberal Democrats	Sheila J. Mackay	356	

=== Townhill and Bellyeoman ===
Townhill and Bellyeoman
Party	Candidate	Votes	%
Independent Campaign for Local Hospital Services	George L Wood	745	
Labour	Helen S. Law	638	
SNP	James Norris	252	
Liberal Democrats	Wink Thompson	147	

=== Garvock and Carnegie ===
Garvock and Carnegie
Party	Candidate	Votes	%
Liberal Democrats	James Tolson	898	
Labour	Kevin Nunn	364	
SNP	Fiona Goodall	307	
Conservative	Robert C. Beattie	216	

=== Halbeath, Hill of Beath and Kingseat ===
Halbeath, Hill of Beath and Kingseat
Party	Candidate	Votes	%
Labour	Alexander Sawers	795	
SNP	Robert Sherry	407	
Liberal Democrats	David F. Hingston	266	

=== Woodmill ===
Woodmill
Party	Candidate	Votes	%
Labour	Robert E. Young	1,103	
SNP	Willie Hewat	296	
Liberal Democrats	Russel McPhate	174	

=== Linburn ===
Linburn
Party	Candidate	Votes	%
Labour	Robert M. Rumney	786	
SNP	Brian J. Goodall	460	
Liberal Democrats	Lesley Anne Burke	346	

=== Brucefield and Nethertown ===
Brucefield and Nethertown
Party	Candidate	Votes	%
Liberal Democrats	William J. Rosiejak	919	
Labour	Frederick L. Forrester	480	
Conservative	Sheila A. Emmerson	159	

=== Ward No. 14 Pitcorthie ===
Pitcorthie
Party	Candidate	Votes	%
Liberal Democrats	Antony Martin	1,231	
Labour	William Sullivan	358	
Conservative	Dennis Halligan	197	

=== Limekilns and Pitreavie ===
Limekilns and Pitreavie
Party	Candidate	Votes	%
Liberal Democrats	Gerald A. McMullan	752	
Labour	Robert W. Eadie	734	
SNP	James Jackson	374	
Scottish Socialist	Gerald McLean	95	

=== Rosyth West ===
Rosyth West
Party	Candidate	Votes	%
Labour	Patrick Callaghan	662	
SNP	Douglas Chapman	652	
Liberal Democrats	William G. O'Brien	198	

=== Rosyth East ===
Rosyth East
Party	Candidate	Votes	%
Labour	Gordon W. Duff	750	
SNP	William Dunn	413	
Liberal Democrats	John R. Urquhart	101	
Conservative	Iris Vaughan	99	
Scottish Socialist	Andrew D. Jackson	92	

=== Inverkeithing West and Rosyth South ===
Inverkeithing West and Rosyth South
Party	Candidate	Votes	%
SNP	Alice McGarry	754	
Labour	Zhivko Gulaboff	389	
Conservative	Valerie M. Finlay	145	
Liberal Democrats	Bruce L. Martin	120	

=== Inverkeithing East and North Queensferry ===
Inverkeithing East and North Queensferry
Party	Candidate	Votes	%
Labour	James Philp	553	
SNP	John G. Murphy	414	
Conservative	David R. Dempsey	261	
Liberal Democrats	Kate Legg	152	

=== Dalgety Bay West and Hillend ===
Dalgety Bay West and Hillend
Party	Candidate	Votes	%
Labour	David C. Arnott	801	
Conservative	Alan M. Trotter	522	
SNP	David Hannah	361	
Liberal Democrats	Mary E. Hipwell	302	

=== Dalgety Bay East ===
Dalgety Bay East
Party	Candidate	Votes	%
Conservative	Stuart R. Randall	843	
Labour	Margaret McLachlan	433	
SNP	John W. Nicol	273	
Liberal Democrats	Francis C. Tollick	228	

=== Ward no22: Crossgates and Moss-side ===
Crossgates and Moss-side
Party	Candidate	Votes	%
Labour	Thomas Dair	826	
Independent	Mary Maxwell	516	
Conservative	Alec Jordan	109	
Liberal Democrats	Keith W. Smith	93	

=== Cowdenbeath Central ===
Cowdenbeath Central
Party	Candidate	Votes	%
Independent	Alexander Maxwell	1,191	
Labour	Thomas G. Marshall	371	
Conservative	Elizabeth Randall	34	
Liberal Democrats	Sandra B. Maccabe	29	

=== Oakfield and Cowdenbeath North ===
Oakfield and Cowdenbeath North
Party	Candidate	Votes	%
Labour	John Simpson	889	
SNP	Ann Bain	348	
Scottish Socialist	Linda Graham	134	
Conservative	William G. Graham	108	
Liberal Democrats	Stephen W. Rottger	57	

=== Kelty ===
Kelty
Party	Candidate	Votes	%
Labour	James Brennan	770	
SNP	Alistair J. Bain	335	
Independent	James P. Ireland	177	
Scottish Socialist	John Penman	173	
Liberal Democrats	Florence J. Sanderson	57	
Conservative	Allan Vaughan	54	

=== Ward No26: Ballingry and Lochore ===
Ballingry and Lochore
Party	Candidate	Votes	%
Independent	William L. Clarke	1,478	
Liberal Democrats	Vicky Coull	57	
Conservative	David C. Hicks	20	

=== Crosshill and Lochgelly North ===
Crosshill and Lochgelly North
Party	Candidate	Votes	%
Labour	James Connelly	719	
SNP	Joseph Paterson	610	
Independent	Duncan McMahon	209	
Conservative	William A. Gardner	53	
Liberal Democrats	Charles S. Sanderson	40	

=== Lumphinnans and Lochgelly South ===
Lumphinnans and Lochgelly South
Party	Candidate	Votes	%
Labour	Grace C. Gray	634	
Independent	Ernest McPherson	562	
Scottish Socialist	Eileen B. Gilroy	104	
Conservative	John Wilson	38	
Liberal Democrats	Kathleen J. MacNaughton	35	

=== Aberdour and Burntisland West ===
Aberdour and Burntisland West
Party	Candidate	Votes	%
Labour	Ronald Edwards	536	
SNP	Carol Gorton	335	
Conservative	Alexander Spence	217	
Independent	Isabella Beveridge	208	
Liberal Democrats	David Forder	190	
Independent	Ian Quinney	178	
Majority		201	

=== Auchtertool and Burntisland East ===
Auchtertool and Burntisland East
Party	Candidate	Votes	%
Independent	William Leggatt	479	
Labour	Alan Smart	462	
SNP	George Kay	400	
Liberal Democrats	John Hipwell	269	
Majority		17	

=== Kinghorn and Invertiel ===
Kinghorn and Invertiel
Party	Candidate	Votes	%
Labour	Fraser Ballantyne	728	
SNP	Ernest Conner	487	
Conservative	Gerald Buxton	244	
Liberal Democrats	David Riches	214	
Majority		241	

=== Linktown and Kirkcaldy Central ===
Linktown and Kirkcaldy Central
Party	Candidate	Votes	%
Liberal Democrats	Alice Soper	642	
Labour	John Farmer	578	
SNP	David MacDonald	322	
Majority		64	

=== Raith and Longbraes ===
Raith and Longbraes
Party	Candidate	Votes	%
SNP	David Torrance	656	
Labour	Judith Hamilton	474	
Conservative	Maureen McLauchlan	269	
Liberal Democrats	David Muncey	251	
Majority		182	

=== Bennochy and Valley ===
Bennochy and Valley
Party	Candidate	Votes	%
Labour	George Allan	831	
SNP	Jacqueline Torrance	377	
Conservative	Douglas Robertson	159	
Liberal Democrats	Fiona Campbell	137	
Majority		454	

=== Templehall East ===
Templehall East
Party	Candidate	Votes	%
Labour	Alexander Thomson	679	
SNP	Richard Todd	343	
Scottish Socialist	Louise McLeary	104	
Liberal Democrats	Lucy Portchmouth	86	
Majority		336	

=== Templehall West ===
Templehall West
Party	Candidate	Votes	%
Labour	William Brand	752	
SNP	William Symington	304	
Scottish Socialist	Maureen Closs	102	
Liberal Democrats	Douglas Dredge	95	
Majority		443	

=== Cardenden, Cluny and Chapel ===
Cardenden, Cluny and Chapel
Party	Candidate	Votes	%
Labour	Margot Doig	911	
Independent	Lewis Gray	253	
Liberal Democrats	Margaret Dredge	247	
Majority		658	

=== Kinglassie, Bowhill and Dundonald ===
Kinglassie, Bowhill and Dundonald
Party	Candidate	Votes	%
Labour	William Aitken	1,230	
Independent	David Smart	222	
Liberal Democrats	Paul Northway	96	
Conservative	Keith Smith	78	
Majority		1,008	

=== Dunnikier ===
Dunnikier
Party	Candidate	Votes	%
Liberal Democrats	Ann Watters	881	
Labour	Audrey Steven	352	
SNP	Annamaria Conner	320	
Majority		529	

=== Hayfield and Balsusney ===
Hayfield and Balsusney
Party	Candidate	Votes	%
Labour	John Mackenzie	646	
SNP	Brian Smith	313	
Liberal Democrats	Gordon Pay	197	
Scottish Socialist	Steve West	142	
Majority		333	

=== Smeaton and Overton ===
Smeaton and Overton
Party	Candidate	Votes	%
SNP	George Leslie	716	
Labour	Charles Haffey	528	
Liberal Democrats	Katherine Horner	75	
Majority		188	

=== Glebe Park, Pathhead and Sinclairtown ===
Glebe Park, Pathhead and Sinclairtown
Party	Candidate	Votes	%
SNP	Albert Ritchie	616	
Labour	Michael Coyne	593	
Liberal Democrats	John Barnett	240	
Majority		23	

=== Dysart and Gallatown ===
Dysart and Gallatown
Party	Candidate	Votes	%
Labour	John Cameron	1,102	
Liberal Democrats	Karen Barnett	462	
Majority		640	

=== Wemyss and Muiredge ===
Wemyss and Muiredge
Party	Candidate	Votes	%
Independent	Andrew Rodger	1,431	
Labour	Thomas Adams	487	
Liberal Democrats	Lois Lothian	72	
Majority		944	

=== Buckhaven and Denbeath ===
Buckhaven and Denbeath
Party	Candidate	Votes	%
Labour	Andrew Paterson	857	
SNP	Tracy Cumming	383	
Liberal Democrats	Niall Dowds	124	
Majority		474	

=== Methilhill ===
Methilhill
Party	Candidate	Votes	%
Labour	Joyce Smith	1,013	
SNP	Peter McCulloch	378	
Liberal Democrats	Elaine Clunie	83	
Majority		635	

=== Methil ===
Methil
Party	Candidate	Votes	%
Labour	Irene Connelly	829	
SNP	Ronald Donaldson	415	
Liberal Democrats	Eric Evans	63	
Conservative	Gordon Michie	57	
Majority		414	

=== Leven East ===
Leven East
Party	Candidate	Votes	%
Labour	Andrew Keddie	849	
SNP	Steven Gillespie	435	
Conservative	James North	246	
Liberal Democrats	Peter Lindsay	164	
Majority		414	

=== Leven West and Kirkland ===
Leven West and Kirkland
Party	Candidate	Votes	%
Labour	Henry Blyth	1,087	
SNP	Alistair Suttie	420	
Conservative	Pauline Downing	91	
Liberal Democrats	John Watson	76	
Majority		667	

=== Ward No50: Kennoway ===
Kennoway
Party	Candidate	Votes	%
SNP	Bryan Thacker	743	
Labour	Vincent Heneghan	490	
Liberal Democrats	George Coull	73	
Conservative	Stewart Aitchison	64	
Majority		253	

=== Windygates, Star and Balgonie ===
Windygates, Star and Balgonie
Party	Candidate	Votes	%
SNP	David Alexander	964	
Labour	Marjory Groundwater	514	
Liberal Democrats	Brian Murray	126	
Conservative	Robert Heer	117	
Majority		450	

=== Markinch and Woodside East ===
Markinch and Woodside East
Party	Candidate	Votes	%
Labour	David Rougvie	1,074	
SNP	John Beare	545	
Conservative	Joan Chalmers	121	
Liberal Democrats	Harry Hutton	104	
Majority		529	

=== Auchmuty and Woodside West ===
Auchmuty and Woodside West
Party	Candidate	Votes	%
Labour	Fiona Purdon	673	
Independent	Robert Taylor	663	
Liberal Democrats	Colin Martin	141	
Majority		10	

=== Pitteuchar and Finglassie North ===
Pitteuchar and Finglassie North
Party	Candidate	Votes	%
SNP	Michael Woods	1,164	
Labour	Kenneth Selbie	325	
Liberal Democrats	Paula Martin	102	
Majority		839	

=== Thornton, Stenton and Finglassie South ===
Thornton, Stenton and Finglassie South
Party	Candidate	Votes	%
SNP	David Cunningham	745	
Labour	James Young	627	
Liberal Democrats	James Balfour	122	
Conservative	Theresa Reed	101	
Liberal Democrats	Jane Kerr	80	
Majority		118	

=== Caskieberran and Rimbleton ===
Caskieberran and Rimbleton
Party	Candidate	Votes	%
SNP	Peter Grant	833	
Labour	Elizabeth Campbell	712	
Liberal Democrats	Judith Fryer	166	
Majority		121	

=== Newcastle and Tanshall ===
Newcastle and Tanshall
Party	Candidate	Votes	%
Labour	Catherine Latto	598	
SNP	Marion Boyle	423	
Conservative	Valerie Brown	107	
Liberal Democrats	Sandra Reid	93	
Majority		175	

=== South Parks and Macedonia ===
South Parks and Macedonia
Party	Candidate	Votes	%
SNP	Alfred Patey	804	
Labour	Anthony Groundwater	488	
Conservative	Ian Brown	90	
Liberal Democrats	William Reid	85	
Majority		316	

=== Leslie and Whinnyknowe ===
Leslie and Whinnyknowe
Party	Candidate	Votes	%
SNP	Fiona Grant	1,186	
Labour	Agnes Mowbray	444	
Liberal Democrats	Philip Ross	117	
Majority		742	

=== Ward No60: Balgeddie and Collydean ===
Balgeddie and Collydean
Party	Candidate	Votes	%
Labour	William Kay	784	
SNP	James Slack	427	
Liberal Democrats	William Elder	154	
Conservative	Brian Mills	135	
Majority		357	

=== Cadham, Pitcoudie and Balfarg ===
Cadham, Pitcoudie and Balfarg
Party	Candidate	Votes	%
Labour	Kay Morrison	686	
SNP	Steven Marwick	466	
Conservative	Douglas Chalmers	147	
Liberal Democrats	David Cole-Hamilton	122	
Majority		220	

=== Falkland, Freuchie and Strathmiglo ===
Falkland, Freuchie and Strathmiglo
Party	Candidate	Votes	%
Liberal Democrats	Ewen W. Jardine	1,104	
Conservative	David P. Croll	327	
SNP	David MacDiarmid	270	
Labour	Margaret V. Murdoch	187	
Majority		777	

=== Auchtermuchty and Ladybank ===
Auchtermuchty and Ladybank
Party	Candidate	Votes	%
Liberal Democrats	Donald Lothian	1,122	
Conservative	Murdo Fraser	390	
Labour	Margaret W. McCulloch	166	
Scottish Socialist	Carlo Morelli	160	
Majority		732	

=== Kettle, Springfield and Ceres ===
Kettle, Springfield and Ceres
Party	Candidate	Votes	%
Liberal Democrats	Marilyn E. Whitehead	1,053	
Conservative	Donald Ellis	504	
Labour	Kate Findlay	156	
Majority		549	

=== Cupar North ===
Cupar North
Party	Candidate	Votes	%
Liberal Democrats	Susan A. Clark	879	
Conservative	William S. Bruce	403	
Labour	David Stoddart	180	
Scottish Socialist	Thomas McAviney	133	
Majority		476	

=== Cupar South ===
Cupar South
Party	Candidate	Votes	%
Liberal Democrats	Margaret C. Kennedy	1,201	
Conservative	Alison J. Murray	598	
Labour	Peter McTiernan	276	
Majority		603	

=== Newburgh and Tay Coast ===
Newburgh and Tay Coast
Party	Candidate	Votes	%
Liberal Democrats	Andrew D. Arbuckle	1,098	
Conservative	Patricia M. Dalrymple	409	
Independent	Robert Ross	309	
Labour	Janet W. Bishop	190	
Scottish Socialist	Colin S. Cameron	70	
UKIP	Alexandra L. Oon	23	
Majority		689	

=== Newport-on-Tay and Wormit ===
Newport-on-Tay and Wormit
Party	Candidate	Votes	%
Liberal Democrats	Timothy E. W. Brett	1,036	
Conservative	Ronald J. Caird	616	
SNP	James M. Finlayson	344	
Majority		420	

=== Tayport and Motray ===
Tayport and Motray
Party	Candidate	Votes	%
Liberal Democrats	Margaret F. Taylor	1,212	
SNP	Kris Murray Browne	299	
Conservative	Belinda Weir	250	
Scottish Socialist	Keith S. White	162	
Majority		913	

=== Ward No70: Leuchars, Balmullo and Guardbridge ===
Leuchars, Balmullo and Guardbridge
Party	Candidate	Votes	%
Liberal Democrats	Eleanor E. Gunstone	992	
Conservative	Norma Davis	350	
Majority		642	

=== Strathkinness and St Andrews West ===
Strathkinness and St Andrews West
Party	Candidate	Votes	%
Liberal Democrats	Frances M. Melville	884	
Conservative	Dorothea M. Morrison	452	
Majority		432	

=== St Andrews Central ===
St Andrews Central
Party	Candidate	Votes	%
Liberal Democrats	William Sangster	532	
Conservative	William Brooks	377	
SNP	Kevin J. Tierney	103	
Majority		155	

=== St Andrews South ===
St Andrews South
Party	Candidate	Votes	%
Liberal Democrats	Sheila R. Hill	996	
Conservative	David R. King	556	
SNP	John J. Docherty	260	
Majority		440	

=== St Andrews South East ===
St Andrews South East
Party	Candidate	Votes	%
Liberal Democrats	Jane A. Liston	646	
Conservative	Keith R. Neilson	426	
SNP	Penelope A. Smith	189	
Labour	Joseph A. Peterson	137	
Scottish Socialist	David W. Watt	72	
Majority		220	

=== Crail, Cameron and Kemback ===
Crail, Cameron and Kemback
Party	Candidate	Votes	%
Liberal Democrats	Peter C. Douglas	1,037	
Conservative	John B. Steven	748	
Labour	Margaret Russell	177	
Scottish Socialist	Lilian Rooney	118	
Majority		289	

=== Anstruther and East Neuk Landward ===
Anstruther and East Neuk Landward
Party	Candidate	Votes	%
Liberal Democrats	Elizabeth Riches	813	
Independent	Robert F. Harper	408	
Conservative	Keith A. Griffiths	179	
Independent	James Braid	166	
Labour	Simon D. Coote	79	
Scottish Socialist	Thomas E. Jones	50	
Majority		405	

=== Elie, St Monans and Pittenweem ===
Elie, St Monans and Pittenweem
Party	Candidate	Votes	%
Conservative	Mike Scott-Hayward	752	
Liberal Democrats	Donald F. Macgregor	721	
SNP	Kenneth Park	261	
Majority		31	

=== Largo ===
Largo
Party	Candidate	Votes	%
Liberal Democrats	John A. Bell	908	
Conservative	Michael B. Foote	513	
SNP	John D. Ovenstone	282	
Labour	Rhona White	102	
Majority		395	

== Subsequent by-elections ==
=== 2005 – Auchtertool and Burntisland East ===
2005 Auchtertool and Burntisland East by-election
Party	Candidate	Votes	%	±%
SNP	George Kay	609	46.7	+21.9
Labour		321	24.6	−4.1
Independent		249	19.1	−10.7
Liberal Democrats		71	5.4	−11.3
Conservative		54	4.1	+4.1
Majority		288		
Turnout			41.0	−10.8
SNP gain from Independent		Swing	+16.3	
