= Inverted bell (disambiguation) =

Inverted bell may refer to:

- Inverted bell, a shape
- Inverted bell curve, in statistics, a bimodal distribution
- Standing bell, musical instrument
