= Food vessel =

Food vessel usually refers to dishware, the vessels from which food is served and upon which it is eaten.

It may also refer to:

- cookware, the vessels in which food is cooked and prepared
- Food Vessel culture (c. 2100–1700 BC)
- Food Vessel, their distinctive pottery
