= Tambour (architecture) =

Architectural term with three meanings

In architecture, tambour has three meanings.

In classical architecture, a tambour (French for 'drum') is the inverted bell of the Corinthian capital, around which acanthus leaves are carved for decoration.

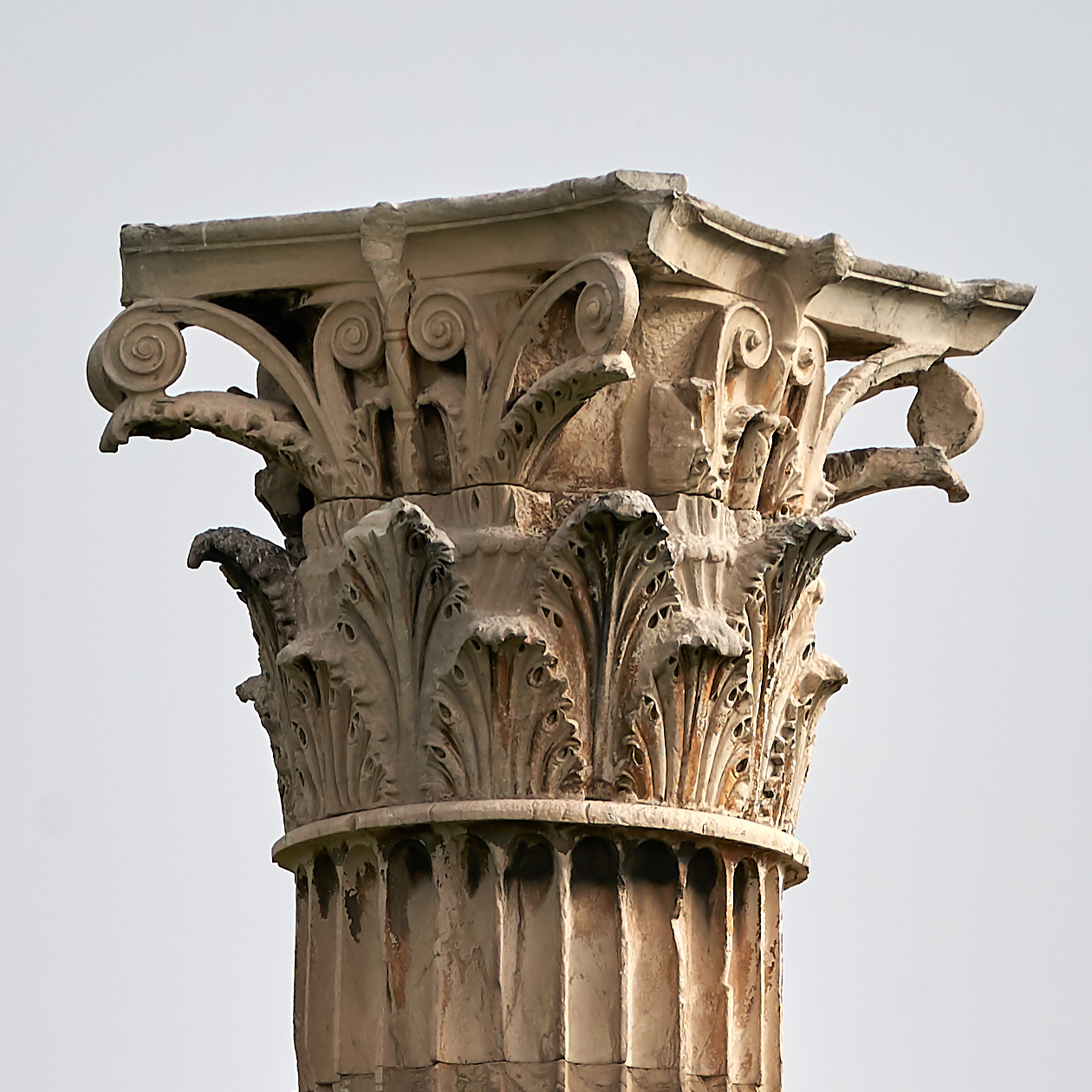
Corinthian capital of the Temple of Olympian Zeus, Athens

The term also applies to the circular or polygonal wall of a structure that supports a dome, cupola, or lantern, whether on the ground or raised aloft on pendentives; in this sense, it is also called a tholobate.

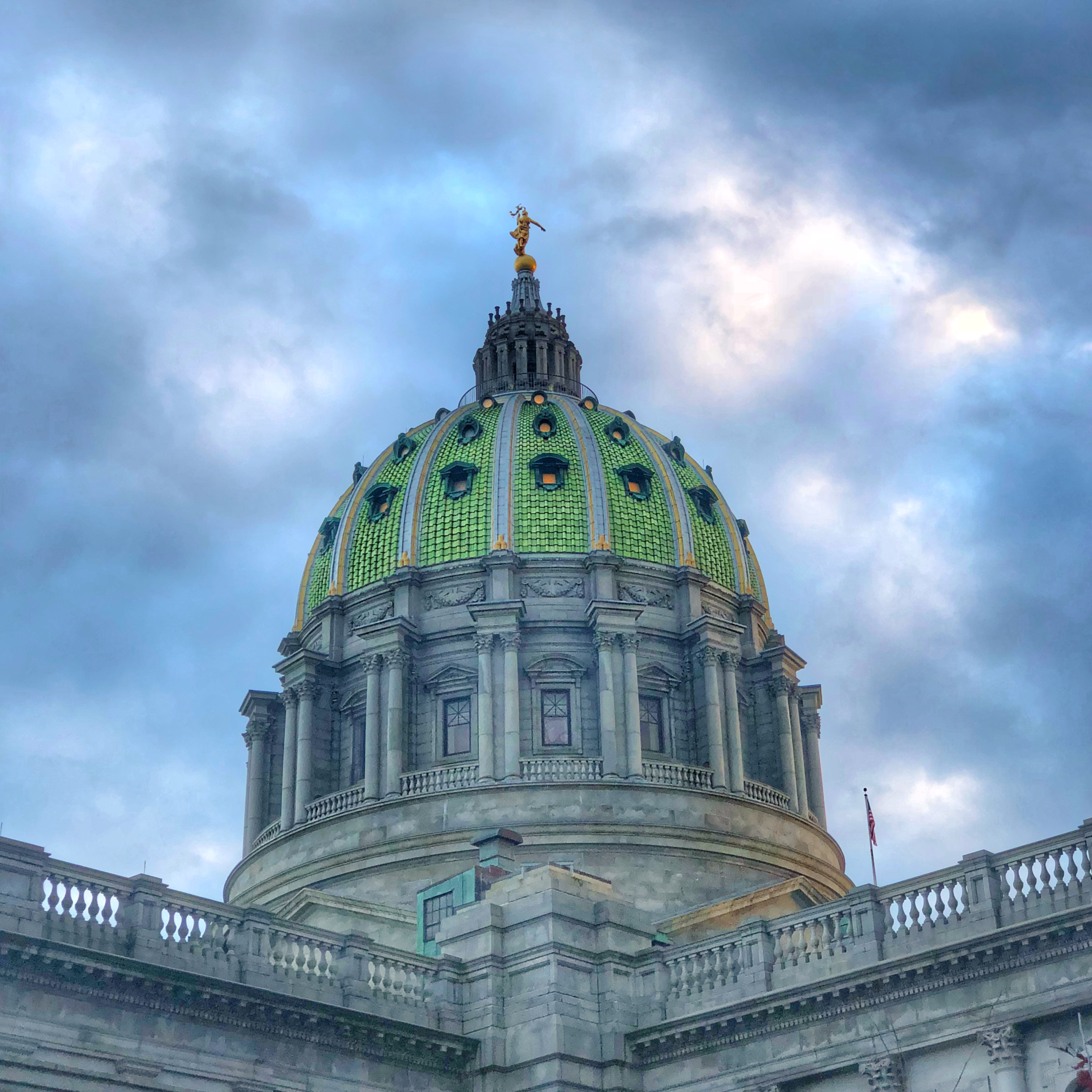
Dome upon tholobate of the Pennsylvania State Capitol, Harrisburg

Finally, tambour can refer to the cylindrical stone blocks, or drums, that make up a column built in several courses.

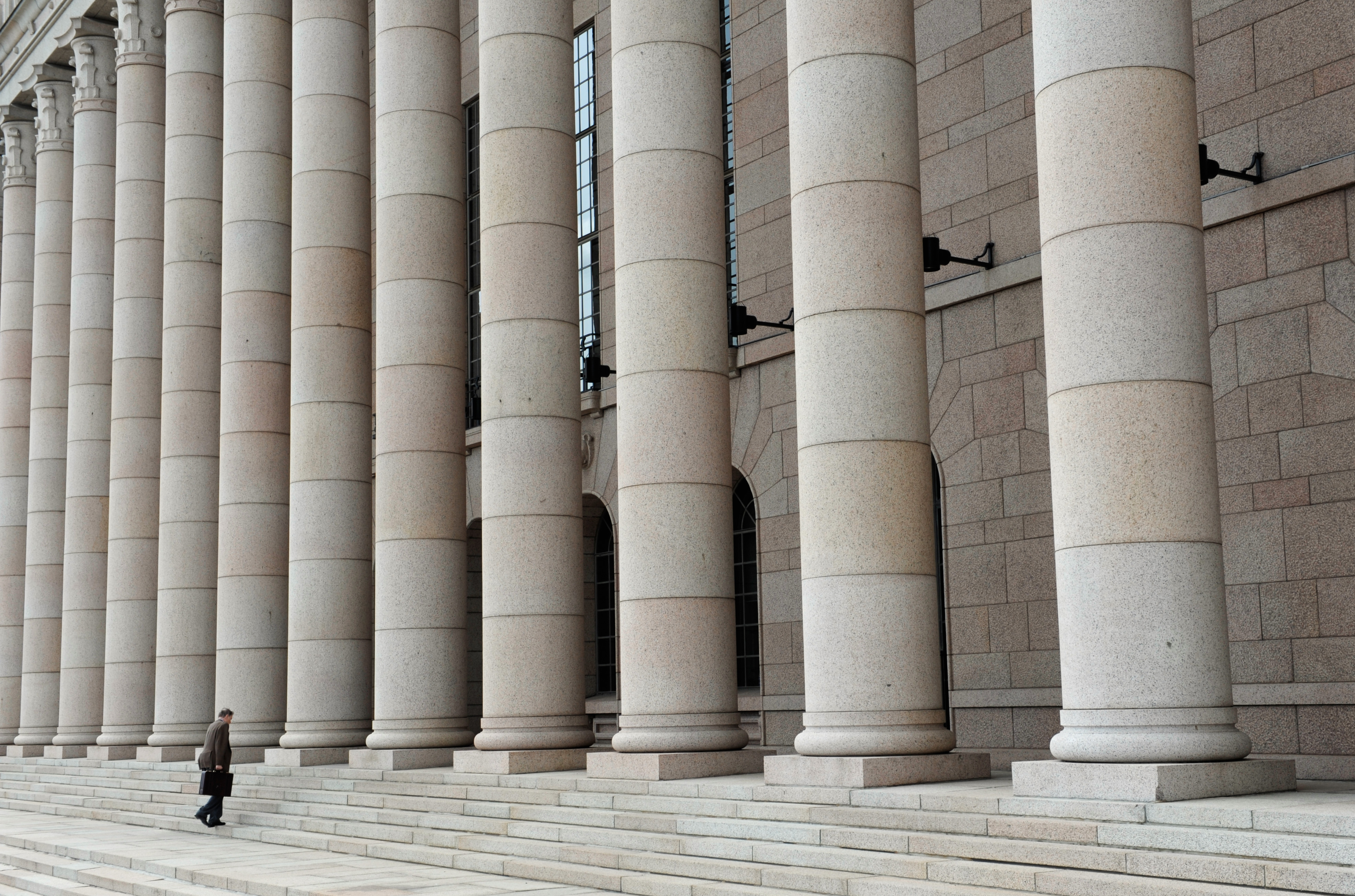
Columns of the Parliament House in Helsinki, Finland
