= Balbirnie Stone Circle =

Archaeological site in Fife, Scotland

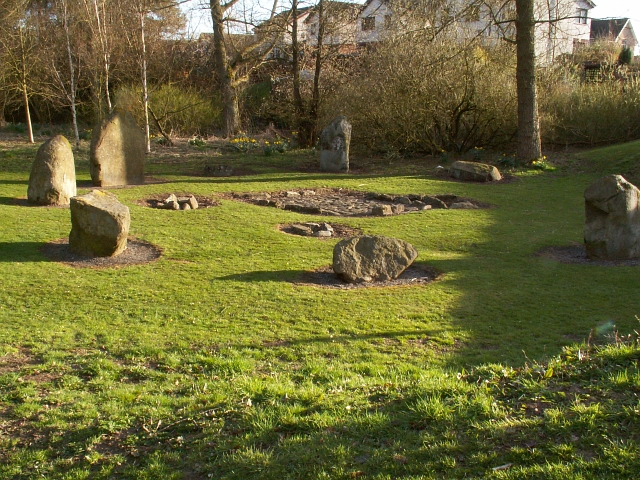
- The circle, transferred from its original location

- Location within Fife
- 56°12′49.82″N 3°9′10.55″W
- Type: Stone circle
- Periods: Late Neolithic to Bronze Age
- Location: Glenrothes, Scotland
- OS grid reference: NO 2859 0296

Site notes
- Excavation dates: 1970–1971
- Archaeologists: Graham Ritchie

Balbirnie Stone Circle is an archaeological site, a stone circle on the north-eastern edge of Glenrothes, in Fife, Scotland. The site was in use from the late Neolithic period to the late second millennium BC.

The prehistoric ceremonial complex of Balfarg is nearby; the scheduling for Balfarg states that "the Balfarg complex, together with the nearby stone circle at Balbirnie and other sites in their vicinity, form one of the most important groups of monuments of Neolithic and Bronze Age date in eastern Scotland."

== Description ==
The stone circle was originally at grid reference NO 2850 0304. The site was excavated in 1970–1971 by Graham Ritchie, before planned widening of the A92 road; the main features of the site were then re-erected nearby at grid reference NO 2859 0296.

=== Excavation ===
There were five stones visible before excavation; the stumps of four stones and the hole of one stone were discovered. The original ten stones stood in an ellipse measuring about 15 by 14 metres (49 by 46 ft), around a rectangular setting of slabs measuring 3.25 by 3.75 metres (10.7 by 12.3 ft).

Three phases of use were established by the excavation. The rectangle of slabs and the stone circle are from the earliest period. Cremated bone was found beneath four of the circle-stones.

At a later time, several cists were inserted within the circle. In two of these, two stones with cup and ring marks and cup marks had been re-used as a side-slab for the cist. Grave goods found included a Food Vessel and a flint knife. Radiocarbon dating of wood associated with a cist gave a date of about 1330 BC. The cists were, in the third phase, covered by a cairn of stones, filling the area within the standing stones up to a height of 0.5 metres (1 ft 8 in). Within the cairn, there were at least 16 cremation burials. Radiocarbon dating of the land surface that had accumulated within the circle gave a date of about 890 BC; it was concluded that the last phase was in the late second millennium BC.

== See also ==
- Stone circles in the British Isles and Brittany
