= Collydean =

Precinct in Glenrothes, Fife, Scotland

Coordinates: 56.213°N 3.186°W

Collydean is a precinct or neighbourhood in Glenrothes, Fife.

== History ==
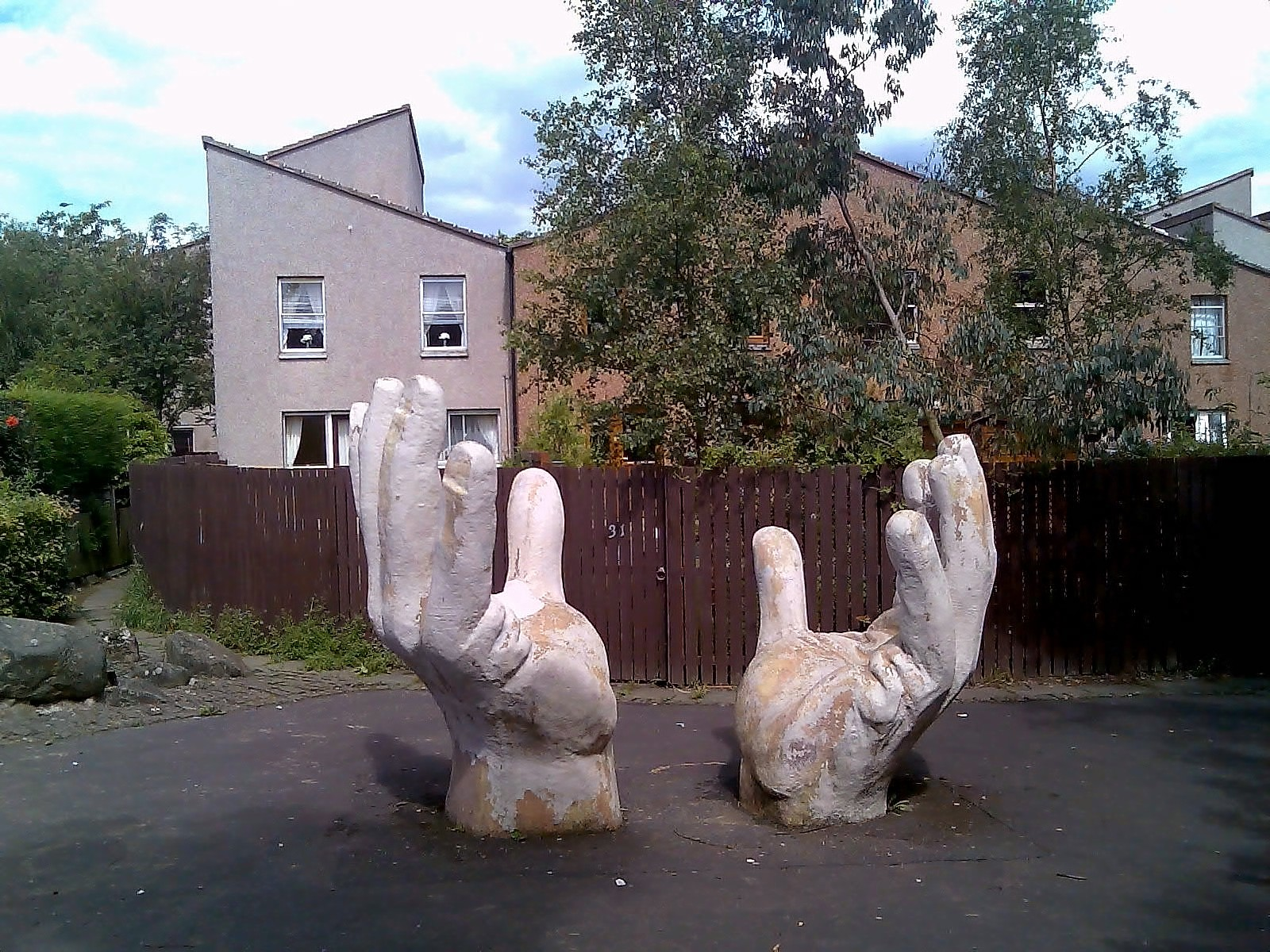
Giant hands sculpture, Collydean

The neighbourhood has been built up in multiple phases. Early housing has been built into staggered terraces with distinct mono pitched roofs. Collydean has been built with Radburn principles with its public footpaths separated from roads. Amenities in the area include playparks, Collydean Granary Baptist Church, a community centre and a Primary School. The ruins of the former Pitcairn House have been preserved and act as a landmark in the area. They are located at the south of the precinct. The community centre hosts a number of activities including after school club programmes and youth clubs. Like the rest of Glenrothes, Collydean used to boast a number of sculptures scattered among much of the housing in the area, these having now been relocated to roundabouts or road sides.
