= 1999 Fife Council election =

1999 Scottish local government election

← 1995	6 May 1999	2003 →

All 78 seats to Fife Council 40 seats needed for a majority
- Turnout: -->
	First party	Second party	Third party
Leader	Christine May
Party	Labour	Liberal Democrats	SNP
Leader's seat	The Lochs
Last election	52	24	9
Seats won	43	21	9
Seat change	▼9	▼3	0
Popular vote	60,891	35,074	42,110
Percentage	38.8%	22.3%	26.8%
	Fourth party	Fifth party	Sixth party
Party	Independent	Conservative	Communist (Scotland)
Leader's seat		Inverkeithing and Dalgety Bay
Last election	5	0	1
Seats won	4	1	1
Seat change	▼1	▲1	0
Popular vote	3,535	11,191	1,628
Percentage	2.3%	7.1%	1.0%
- Results by ward.
Council Leader before election
Alex Rowley
Labour
Council Leader after election
Christine May
Labour

1999 Elections to Fife Council were held on 6 May 1999, the same day as the other Scottish local government elections and the Scottish Parliament election. The elections were the first after the third boundary review which resulted in 78 individual councillors being elected.

== Election results ==
Fife local election result 1999
Party	Seats	Gains	Losses	Net gain/loss	Seats %	Votes %	Votes	+/−
Labour	43		9	▼9	55.1	38.8	60,891	
Liberal Democrats	21		3	▼3		22.3	35,074	
SNP	9			0		26.8	42,110	
Independent	4	1	2	▼1		2.2	3.489	
Conservative	1	1		▲1	1.3	7.1	11,191	
Communist (Scotland)	1			0		1.0	1,628	
Democratic Left	1					1.0	1,519	
Independent Labour	0				0.0	0.6	990	
Scottish Socialist	0				0.0	0.0	34	
Christian Independents	0				0.0	0.0	46	

Turnout was 56.1%

== Party performance ==
Labour performed very well continuing control of its majority on the Council.

== Changes since last election ==
Boundary Commission for Scotland had its Third review in to the ward area for Fife Area. The resulting changes lead to 14 fewer wards.
