= Kingdom Shopping Centre =

The Kingdom Shopping Centre
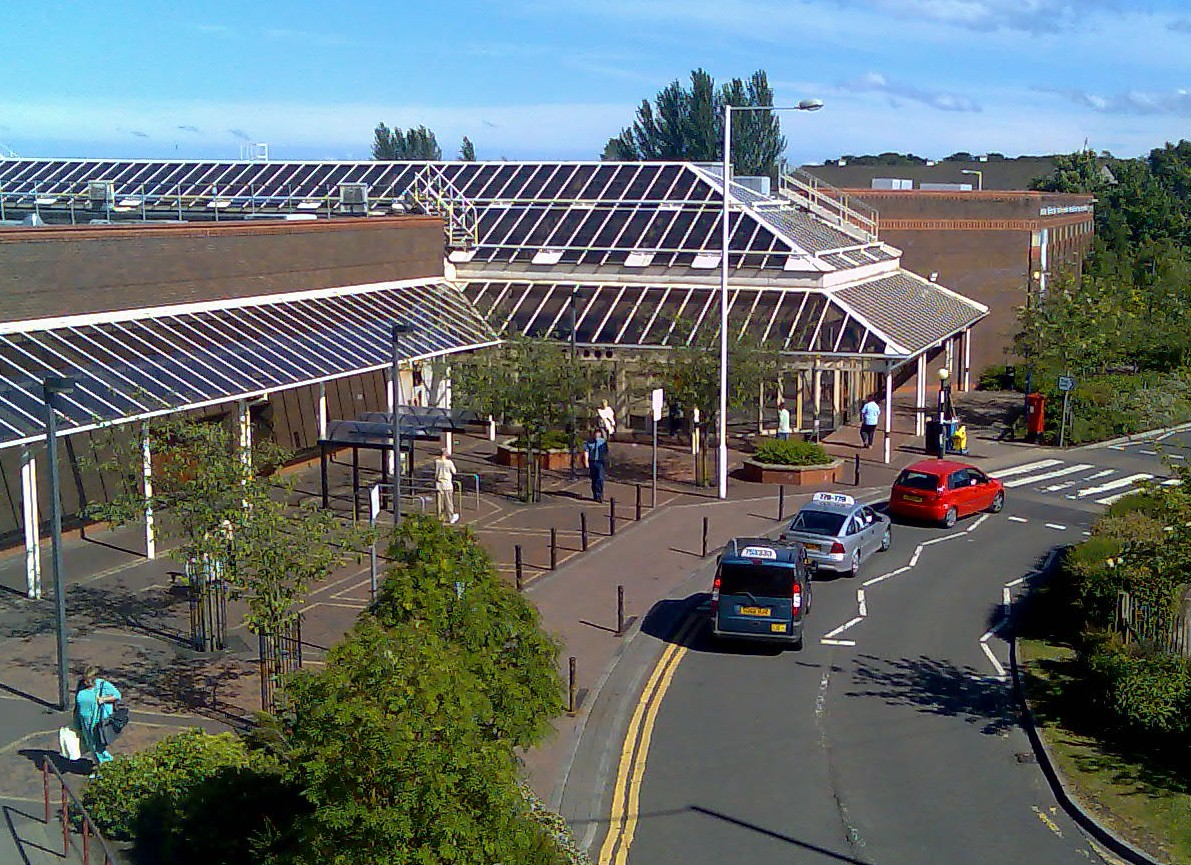
- Location: Glenrothes, Fife and Scotland
- Coordinates: 56.19609°N 3.17273°W
- Address: Glenrothes Town Centre
- Opened: 1963
- Developer: Neale House / Glenrothes Development Corporation
- Owner: Focus Estate Fund
- Num. of stores: 120 units
- Floor area: 35,868 m^{2} (386,080 sq ft)
- Parking: 1,500
- Website: kingdomshoppingcentre.co.uk/about-us/

The Kingdom Shopping Centre is an indoor retail and commercial complex in Glenrothes, located in the town centre. It is the largest indoor shopping centre in Fife and is one of the largest single-level indoor shopping centres in Scotland with around 36,000 m^{2} (390,000 sq ft) of (gross) floorspace.

The shopping centre has some of the highest levels of footfall in Fife and contains around 120 shop units. It has a wide selection of national multiples and independent retailers, food and drink outlets, banks, building societies, leisure and other service operators. A large indoor trampoline park, soft play and arcade facility and the town's central library and the Rothes Halls - the town's theatre and civic centre are located within the western end at the Marchmont Gate entrance to the shopping centre.

A bingo hall, a cinema and a ten pin bowling alley are accessed externally at the Albany Gate and Carrick Gate/Church Street entrances. Glenrothes bus station is located at Lyon Way adjacent to the Postgate entrance. The Glenrothes Baptist Church operates from a former office block on the northern side of the shopping centre at Falkland Place. A number of drive-through outlets are located on North Street adjacent to Leslie Road. The Golden Acorn Hotel, numerous hot food takeaways, restaurants, pubs/bars, indoor event and entertainment venues are also adjacent to the shopping mall focussed along Church Street.

== History ==
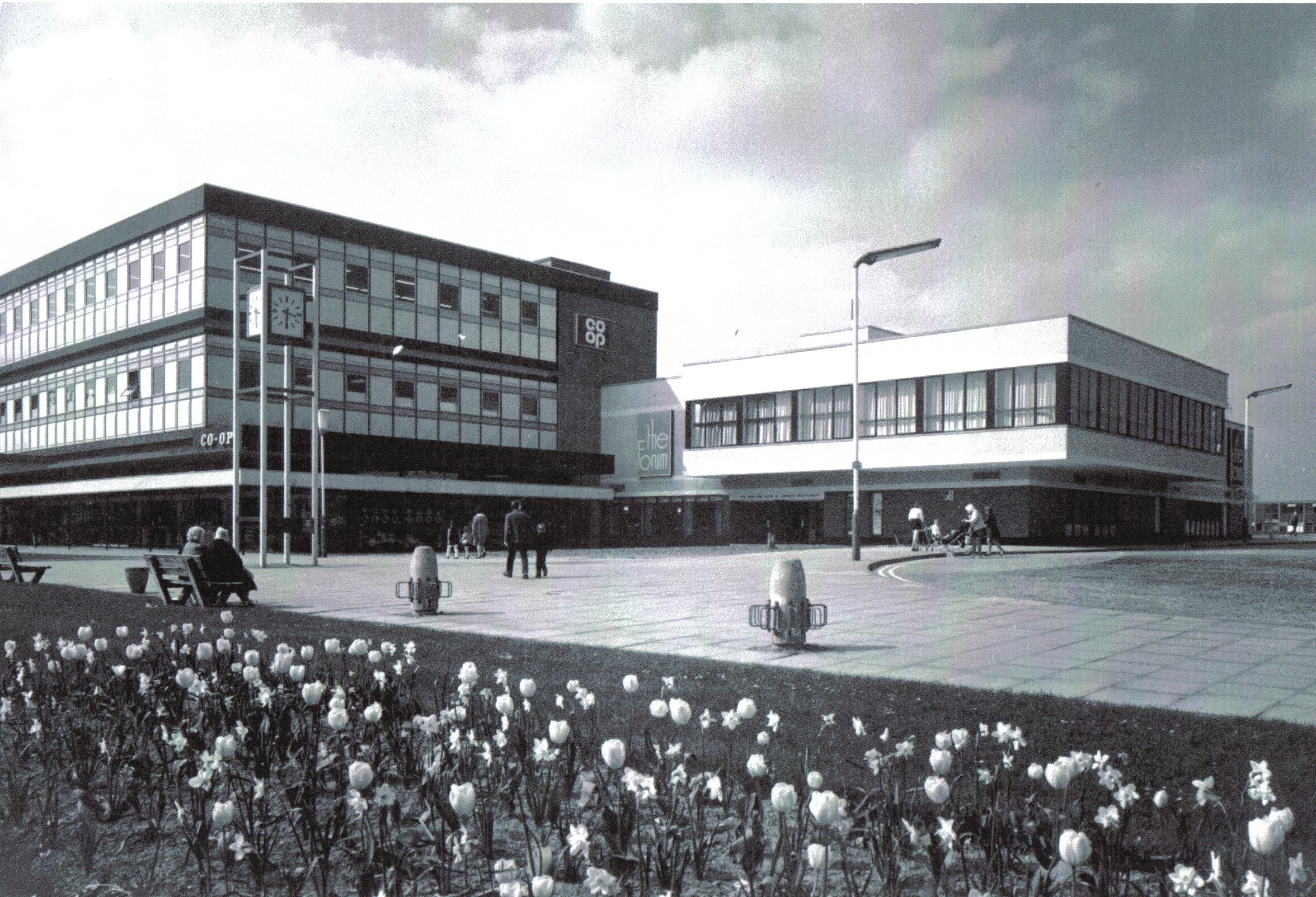
Phase 1 - Town Clock & former Co-Op department store built in the 1960s at Albany Gate

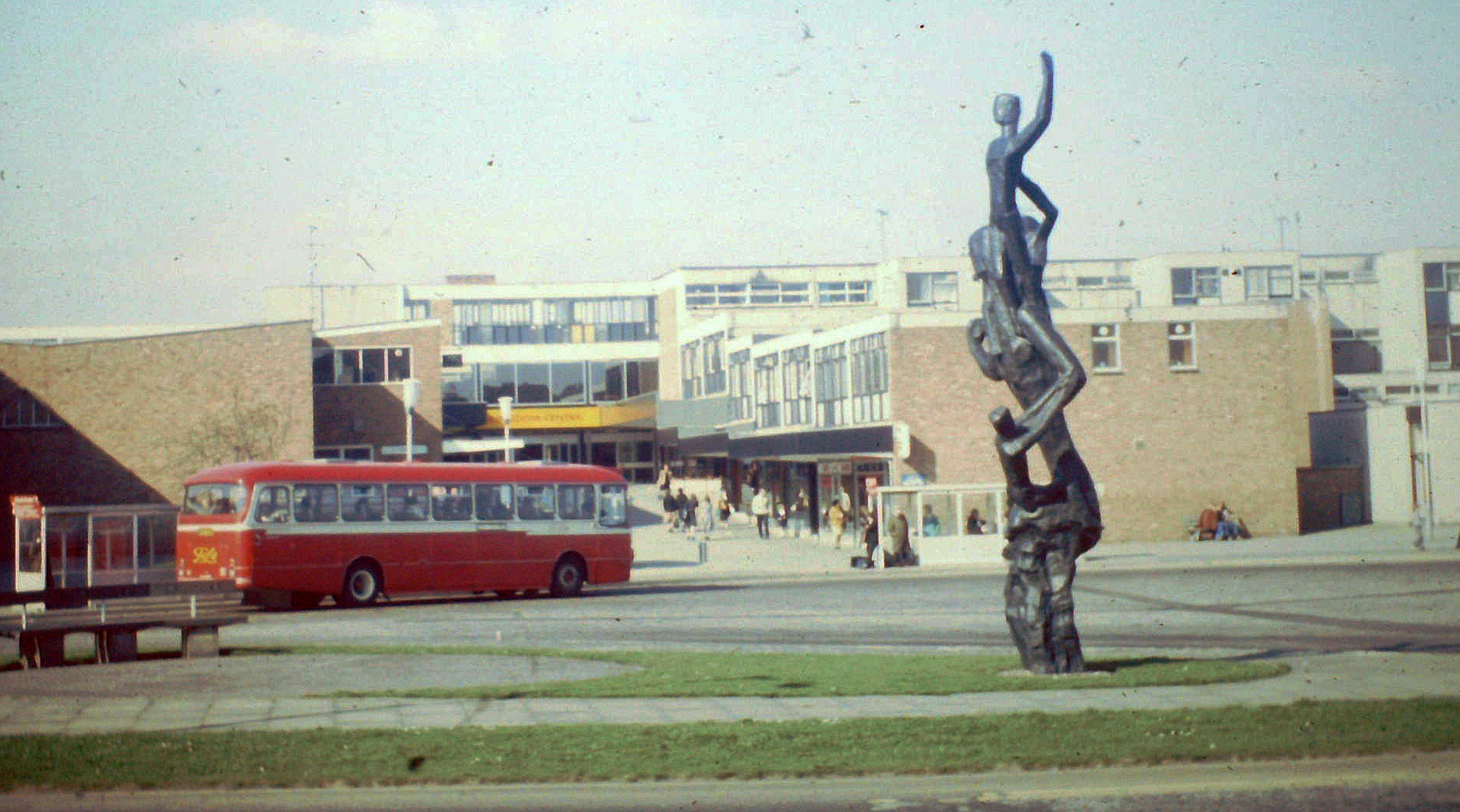
Phase 1 - Bus station and Postgate, part of the first phase of the town centre shown in the 1970s

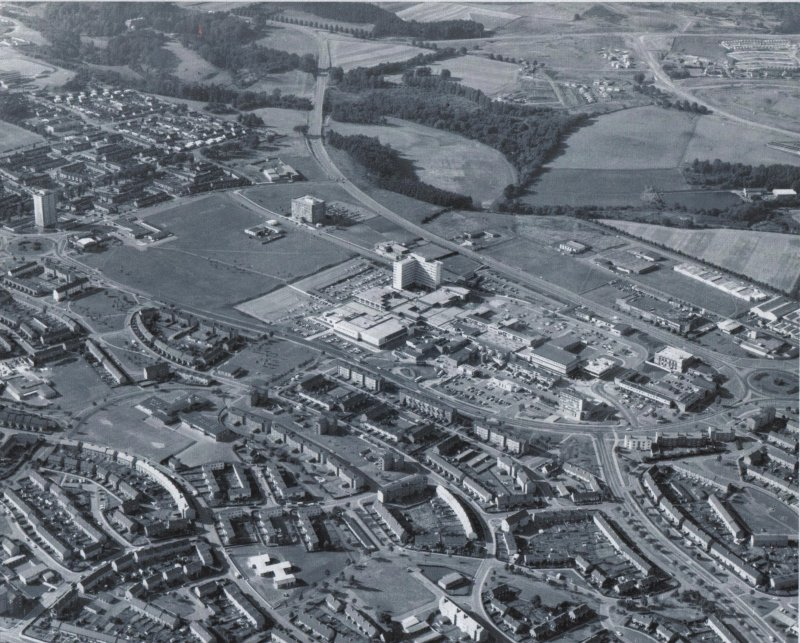
Phases 1 and 2 aerial image (circa 1970s)

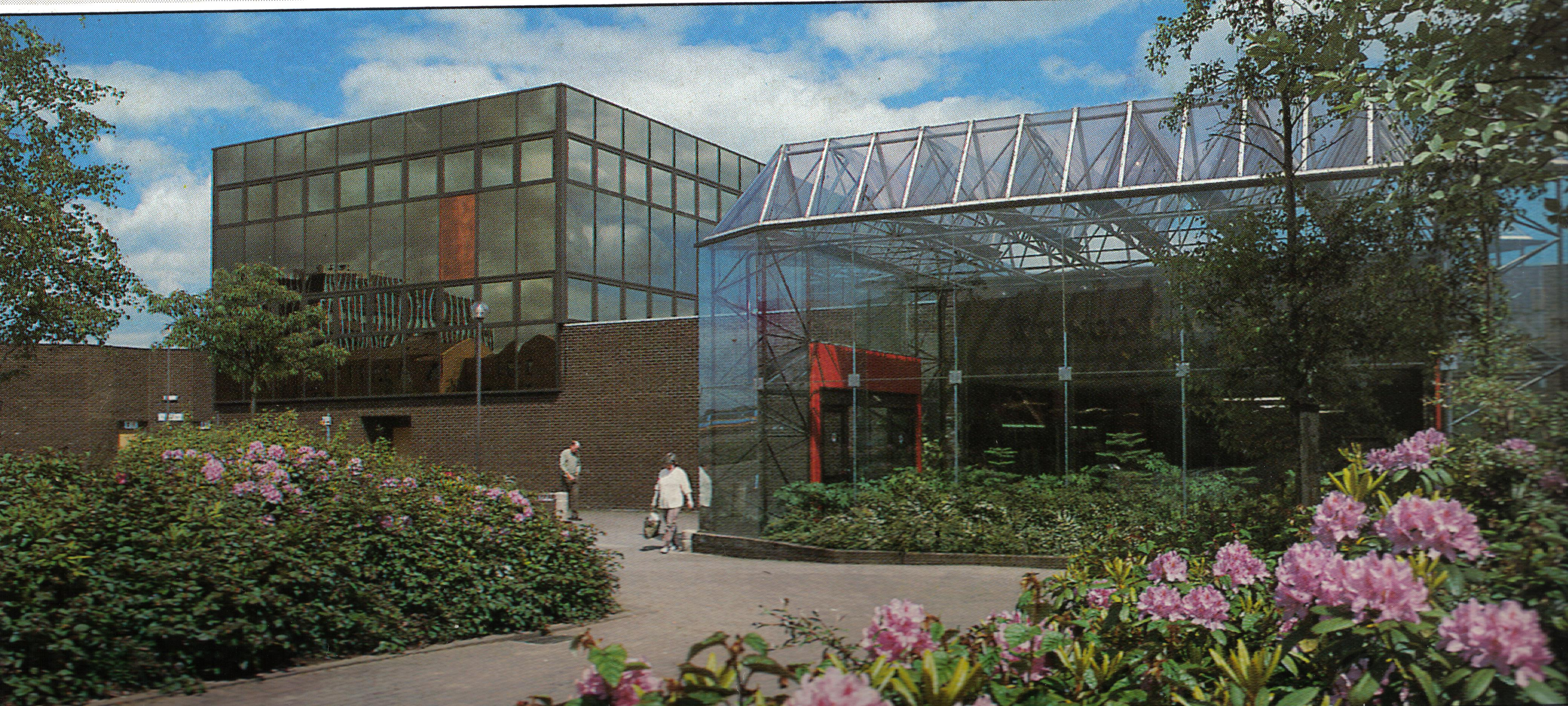
Former Phase 3 entrance built in the 1980s

The Kingdom Shopping Centre was developed over a number of phases between 1960 and 2000, coinciding with the rapid growth of the new town and the rising local population. Initially, the Glenrothes Development Corporation envisaged that the town centre area would be built on the same principles of the English new towns such as Stevenage, Bracknell and Harlow consisting of a series of shopping streets and squares separated from traffic. As shopping trends and attitudes changed in subsequent decades, much of the town centre became internalised, consistent with the delivery of the shopping mall development model being made popular in North America and also being delivered in other towns and cities across the UK.

=== Phase 1 ===
The first phase was built around Central Avenue, between North Street and Church Street in the eastern portion of the town centre. This was in the form of two to three storey shop and business units orientated around a modern Pedestrian zone creating what is now Lyon Square, Albany Gate, Kintyre Gate and Postgate. A three-storey glazed butterfly roof and a modern fountain were incorporated as features in the design of the main public square. The Golden Acorn Hotel, a ten pin bowling alley, the town's Post Office, job centre and a bus turning circle were all delivered as part of the early phases of development. A department store was built in 1964 to create a large anchor store at the eastern entrance to the square and a town clock was built as a feature adjacent to the store.

=== Phase 2 ===
The design of the first phase had a number of problems, including a leaking glass roof on the main square, vandalising of the public fountain and experiencing wind tunnel effects due to open and exposed entrances to the square. In 1976 a decision was taken to remove the glazed roof and the fountain and roof over the square at shop fascia height creating an internalised and environmentally controlled space. The shopping centre was also extended west to the point where Falkland Square is now and was anchored by a department store. A supermarket at Carrick Gate and the New Glenrothes House office block (since demolished in 2009) at Falkland Gate were built as later additions to the second phase.

=== Phase 3 ===
In 1982 a third phase was built extending the centre further west. The domed Unicorn Square was the principal feature of the third phase and Unicorn House, an office block with distinctive reflective glass, was built to the north of the development. A supermarket anchored the third phase of the shopping centre when it opened. A cinema, bingo hall and nightclub were also constructed at Carrick Gate.

=== Phase 4 ===
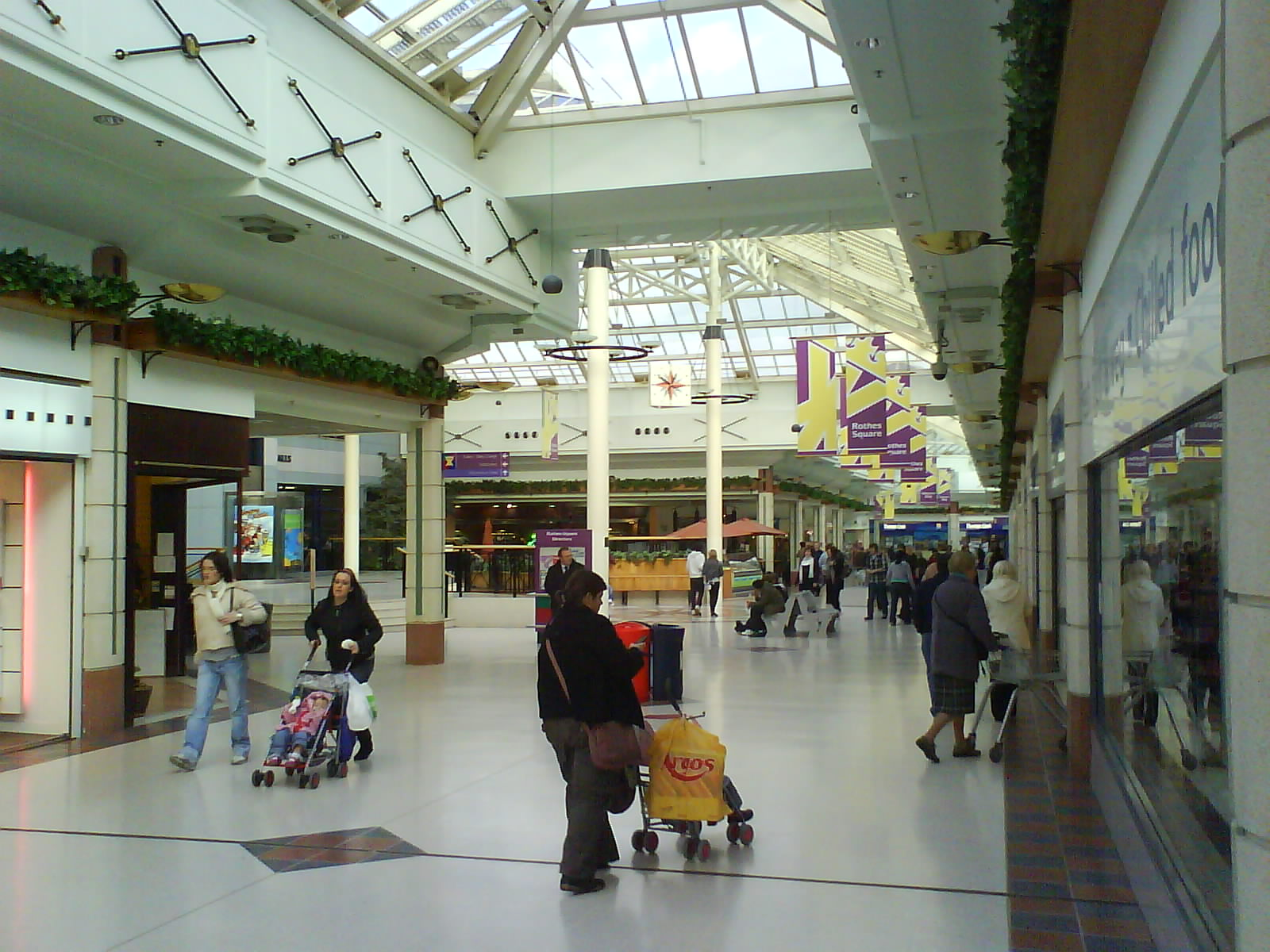
Phase 4 - Marchmont Gate and Rothes Square, built in the 1990s

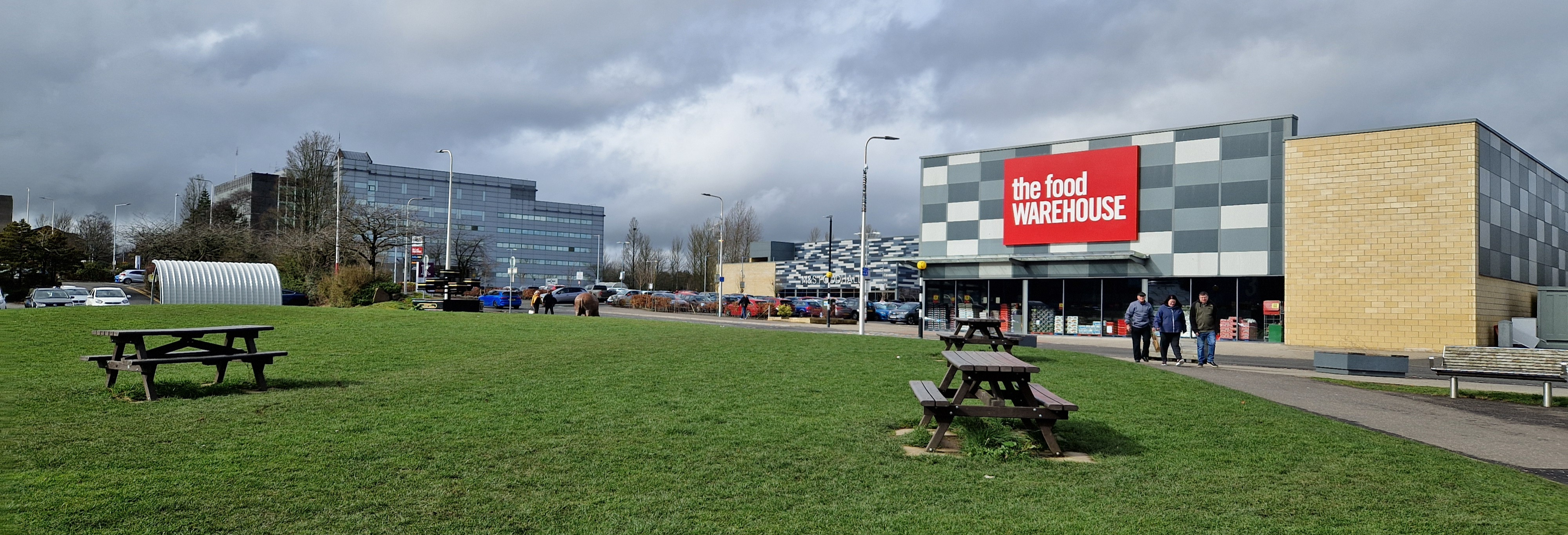
Redevelopment around Falkland Gate and North Street opened in 2019

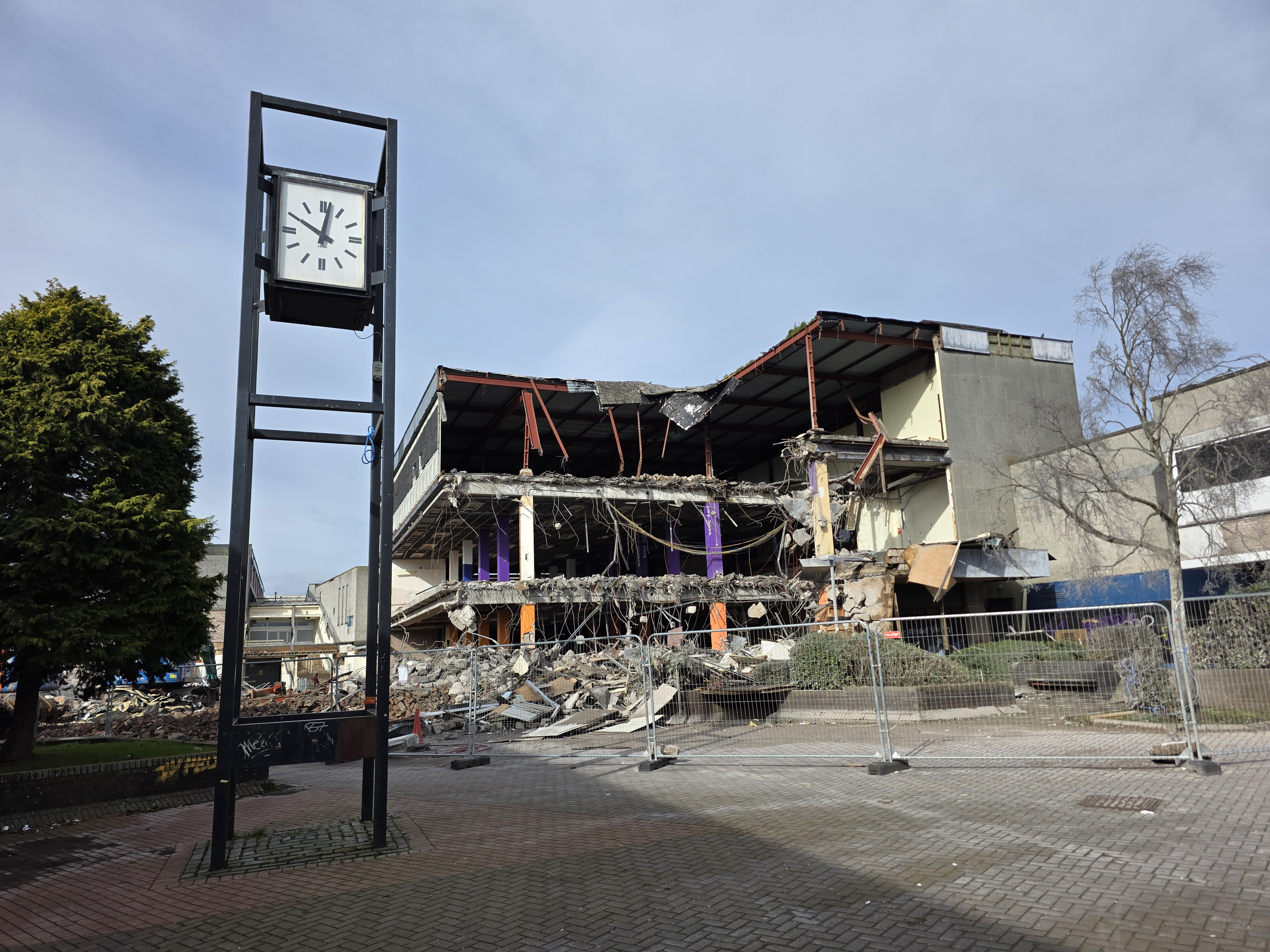
Demolition works at Albany Gate in 2026

In 1993, with the winding up of the Glenrothes Development Corporation (GDC) on the horizon, a fourth phase was built. This was partially funded with a central government grant to provide any last major projects for the new town. The fourth phase incorporated the Rothes Halls, a multi-purpose community facility with a café, theatre, library and conference facilities.

A major feature of the fourth phase is Rothes Square complete with a pyramid-shaped glass roof, a hanging triangular clock, circular feature floor design and a mock "alfresco" style café. A supermarket anchored the fourth phase of the centre when it first opened.

=== Later development phases ===
Development post-phase 4 has largely departed from the internalised shopping centre format. The Henge Retail Park was completed in early 2019 sitting adjacent to the shopping centre at Falkland Gate and North Street. Two drive-thru outlets were later developed adjacent to the retail park on North Street in 2021.

=== Future proposals ===
A range of development projects are proposed to regenerate the town centre steered by a masterplan that was approved by the Glenrothes Area Committee in March 2021. This seeks to address a variety of negative trends including addressing the reduction in retail operators and office floorspace in the town centre due to changing market and working requirements and rationalisation of Fife Council's office estate. The masterplan also recommends celebrating the unique legacy of public art bequeathed to the town, introducing new business opportunities outwith the Kingdom Shopping Centre, creating new public spaces and meeting areas including a new town square, and supporting an enhanced evening economy. Demolition of older parts of the Kingdom Shopping Centre at Albany Gate were undertaken in 2026.
