= Cadham =

Precinct in Glenrothes, Fife, Scotland

Coordinates: 56.20°N 03.17°W

- Location within Fife
- OS grid reference: NO2702
- Council area: Fife
- Country: Scotland
- Sovereign state: United Kingdom
- Police: Scotland
- Fire: Scottish
- Ambulance: Scottish

Cadham is a precinct in the former new town of Glenrothes in Fife, Scotland. The oldest part of Cadham was once a hamlet and was established to house workers of the nearby Tullis Russell papermills. In the 1970s the Glenrothes Development Corporation expanded the hamlet to become a housing precinct. A neighbourhood shopping centre which takes the name of the village was also established as part of the development. The original section of the Cadham Village is now designated a conservation area.

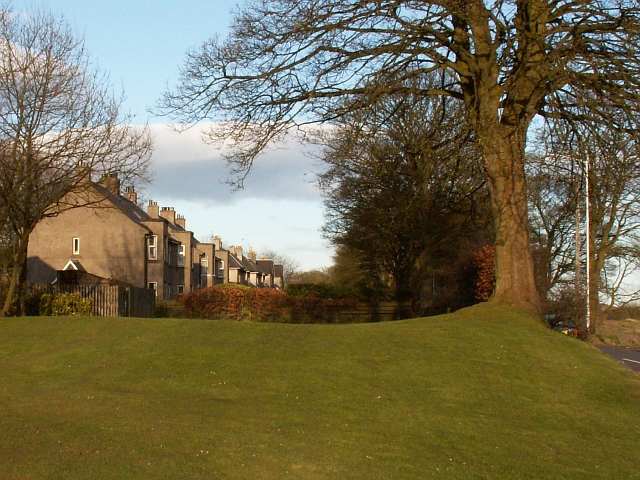
Houses in Cadham
