= Food Vessel =

Food vessels are an Early Bronze Age, c. 2400–1500 BC (Needham 1996), pottery type. It is not known what food vessels were used for and they only received their name as antiquarians decided they were not beakers (regarded as drinking-vessels) and so it provided a good contrast. Recently, the concept of the food vessels was questioned by many archaeologists in favour of a concept of two different traditions: the bowl tradition and the vase tradition. Vases are tall vessels with their height being greater than their largest diameter, while bowls are short vessels with their height being less than or equal to their greatest diameter (Gibson 2002, 95).

== Description ==
Food vessel fabric is coarse and thick and sometimes has elaborate rims in comparison to beakers, which have fine fabrics and simple rims (Gibson & Woods 1997, 158). Food vessels generally have complex decoration, and are of a similar form to other second millennium vessels, such as collared urns and accessory vessels, suggesting they all stemmed from the same type of Neolithic vessel (Gibson & Woods 1997, 162).

The earliest food vessels are of the bowl form and first appear in Ireland during the Late Neolithic/Early Bronze Age transition (~2400 BC). It is a possibility that vessels discovered in Scotland and Ireland dated to the Early/Middle Neolithic, known as impressed wares, are the precursor of the food vessel (Gibson 2002, 95). The single-burial tradition dominate and together with the pottery the feature is cited to have strong roots in the beaker tradition that dominates in many areas of western Europe. They may have reached Ireland via Britain from the lowland areas around the Rhine or farther north. In Ireland food vessels coincide with beakers and have been found all over. In Britain food vessels are attested around 2200 BC and are most prevalent at the time beaker pottery was being replaced by other types of ceramic, such as cordoned urns and collared urns. In Britain they have a distinct focus in the north.

Food vessels occur frequently with both inhumations and cremations in Britain and Ireland (Burgess 1980, 82).

== Food Vessel culture ==
The Food Vessel culture is a name given by some archaeologists to a culture of northern Britain and Ireland during the Early Bronze Age c. 2100–1700 BC (Burgess 1995, 145) due to the material culture of the people. The term Food Vessel culture is not generally used in modern archaeological reports as the term is seen as rather outdated due to changes in archaeological theory.
