= Inverted bell =

Geometric shape

The inverted bell is a metaphorical name for a geometric shape that resembles a bell upside-down.

== By context ==
In architecture, the term is applied to describe the shape of the capitals of Corinthian columns.

The inverted bell is used in shape classification in pottery, often featured in archaeology as well as in modern times.

In statistics, a bimodial distribution is sometimes called an inverted bell curve.

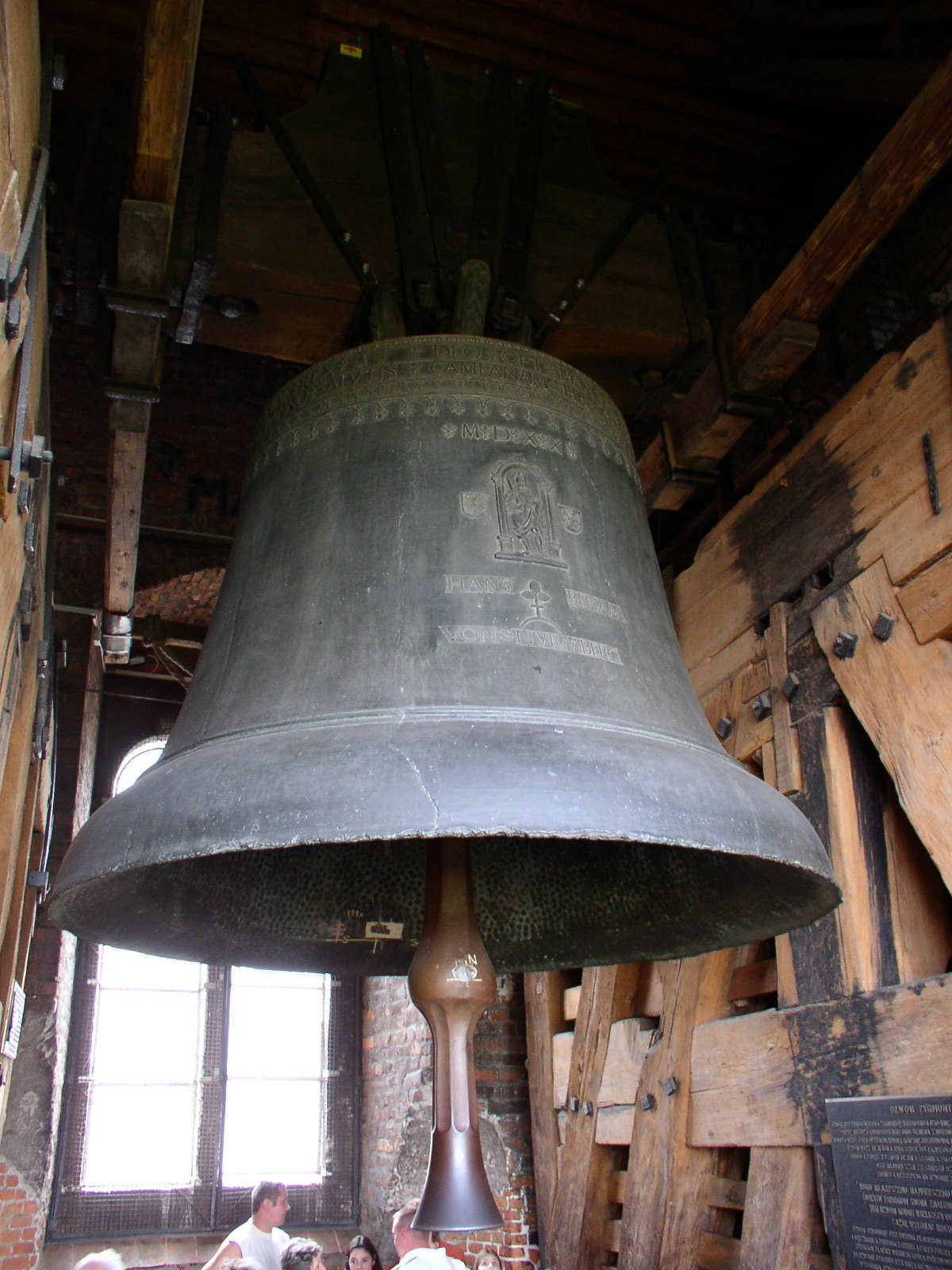
A bell

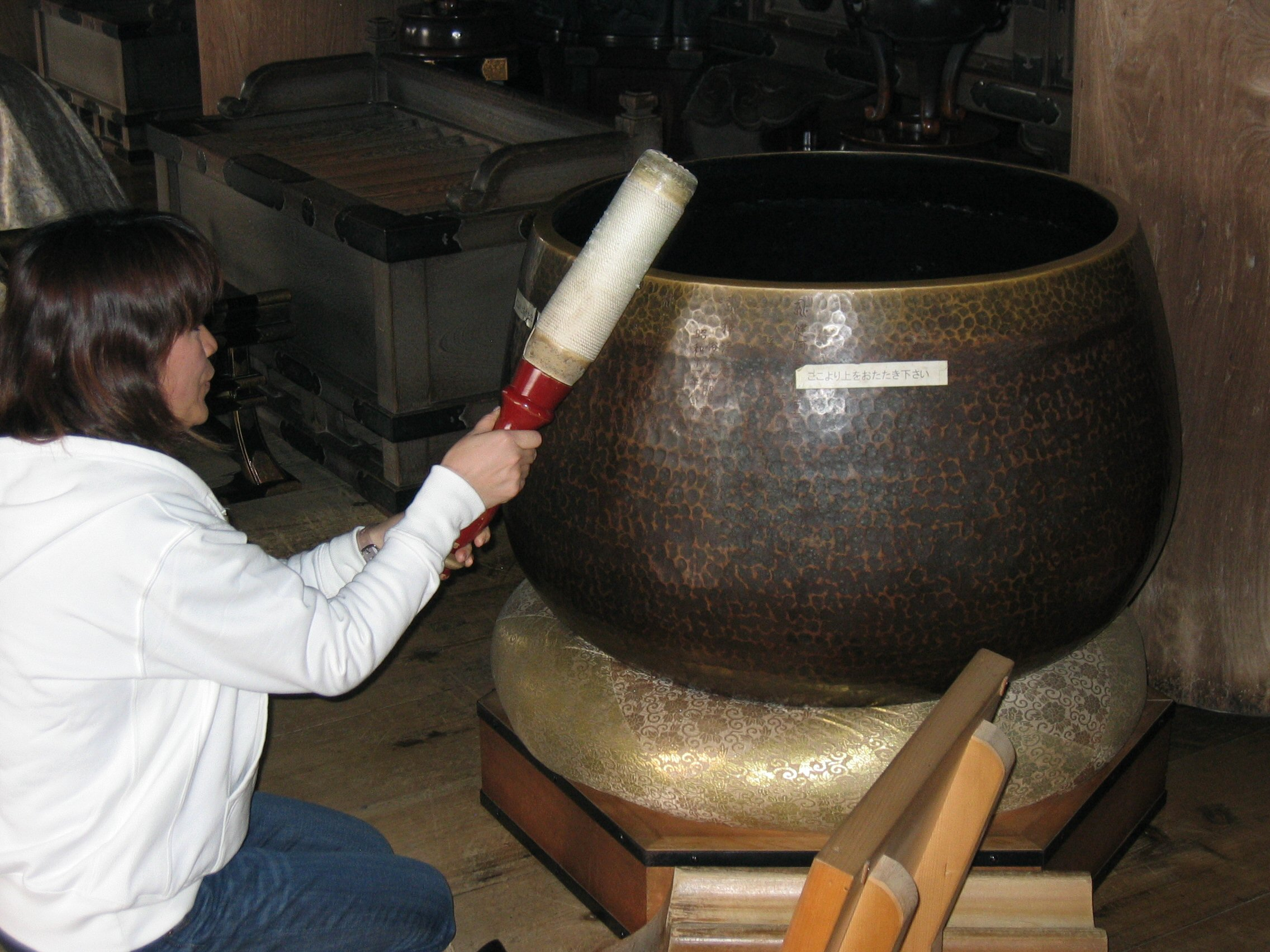
Standing bell (rin)

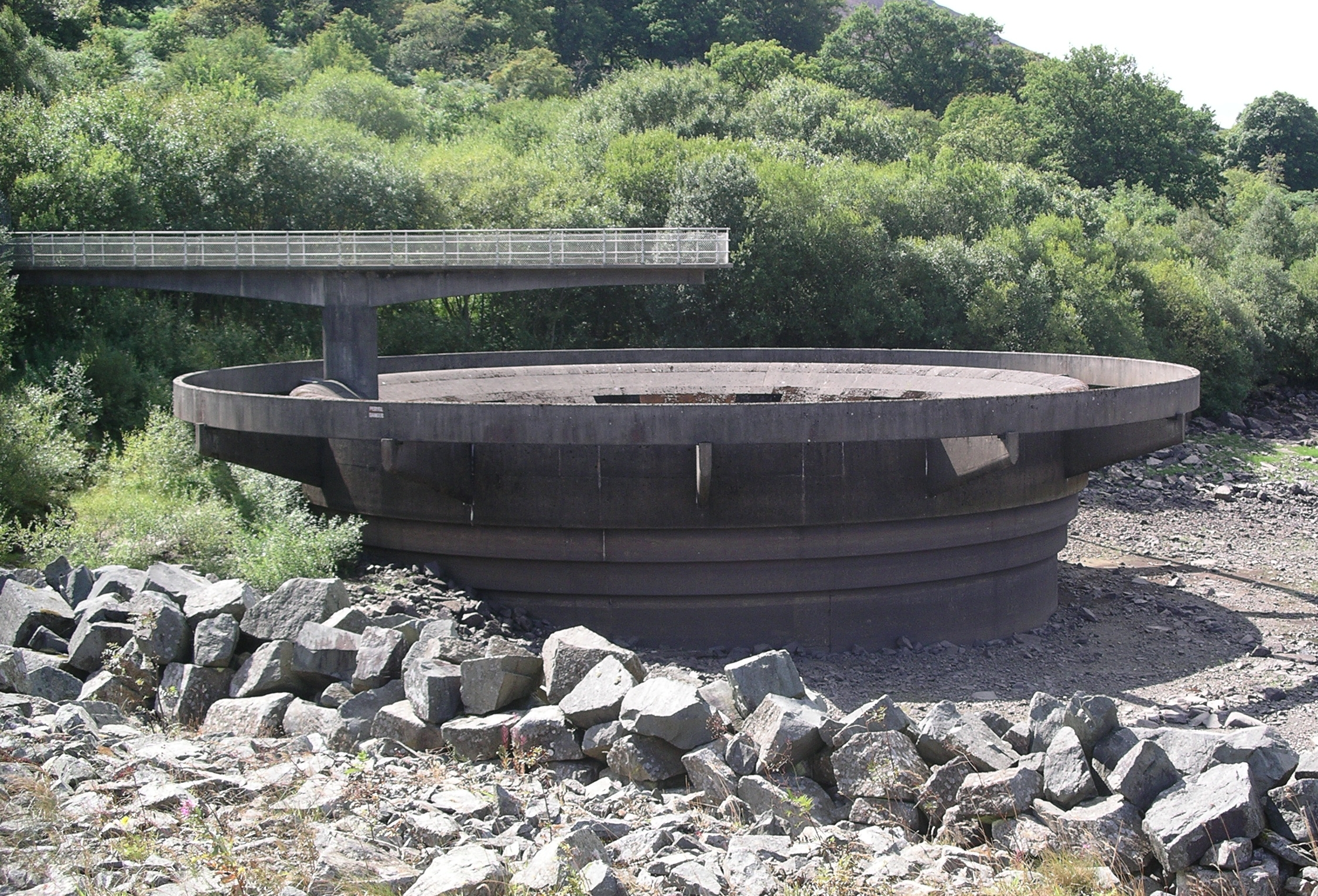
Bell-mouth spillway at Llyn Celyn

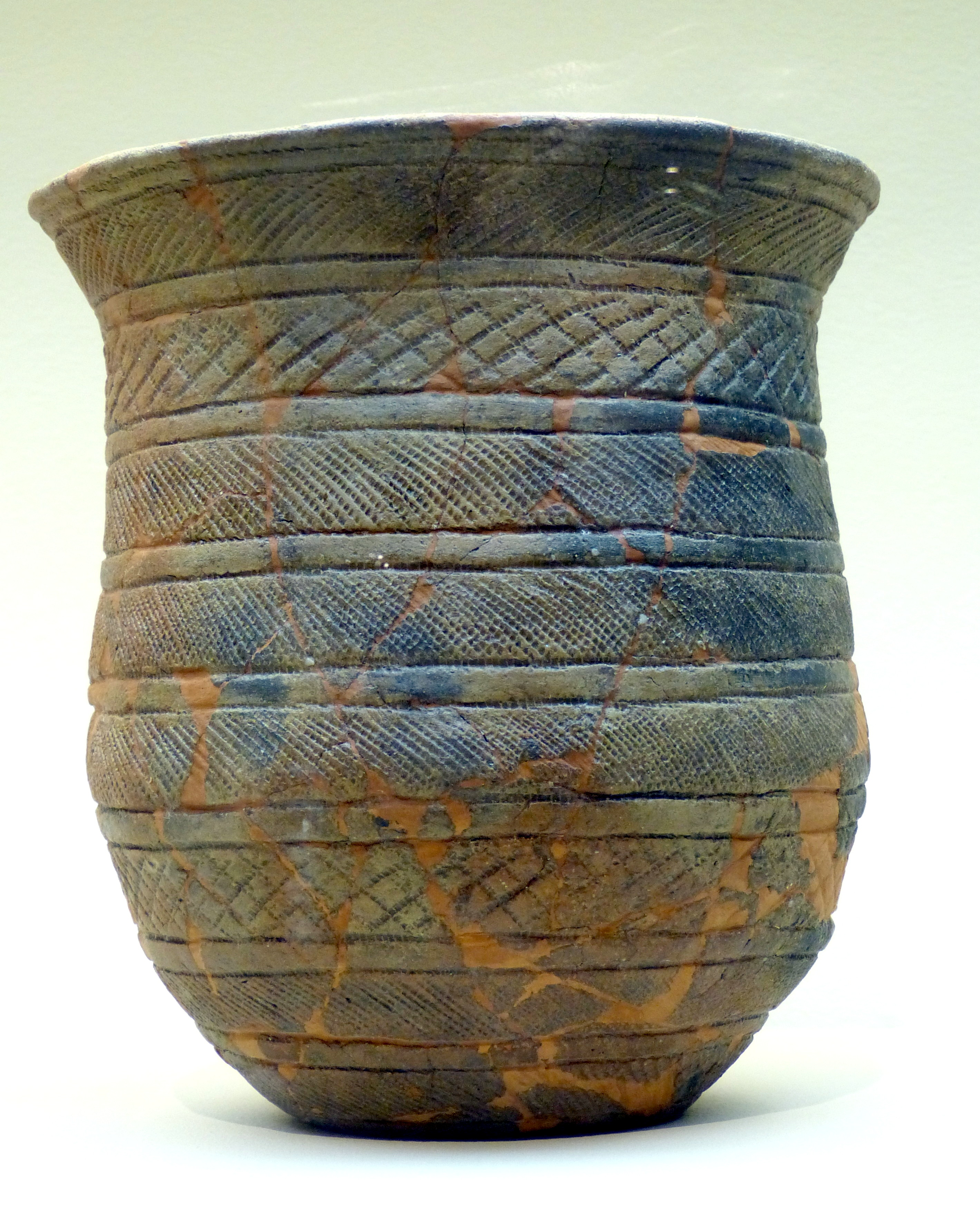
Inverted-bell beaker from Atting during the Beaker culture

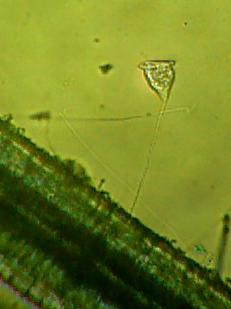
Vorticella protozoa

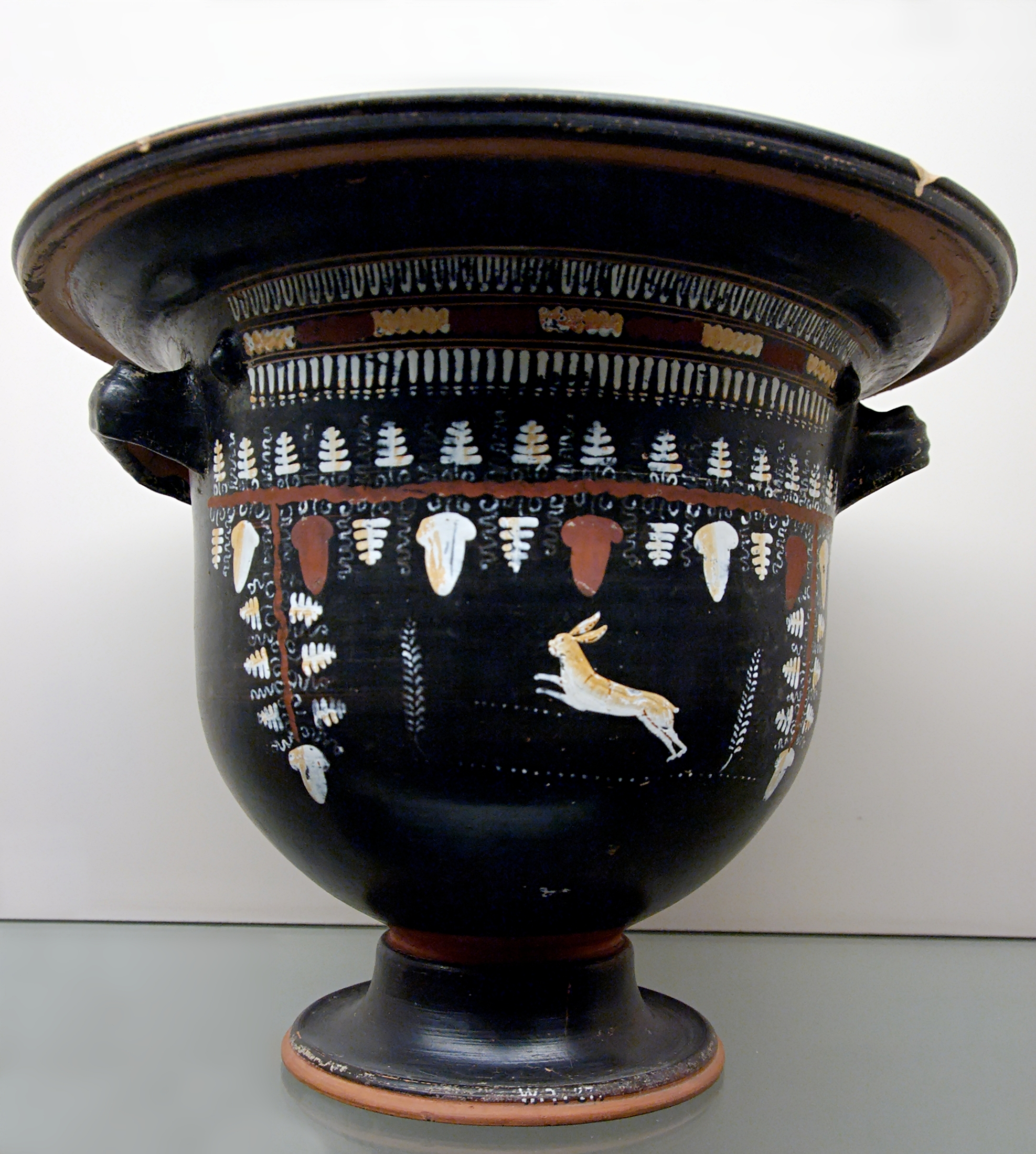
Bell krater

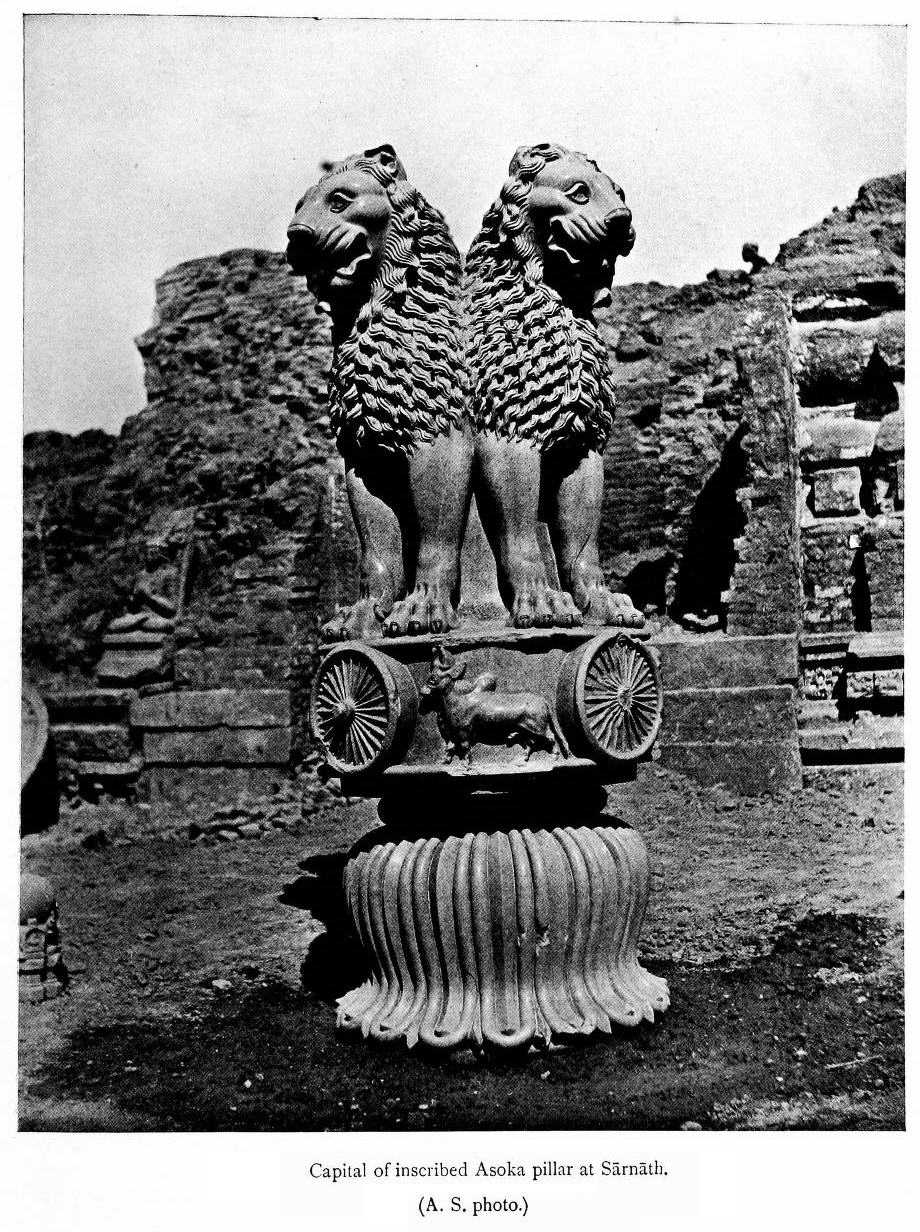
Ashoka Bell ( lotus flower shaped 250 BCE)
