= Pitcairn House =

Building in Fife, Scotland

Coordinates: 56.2124°N 3.1773°W

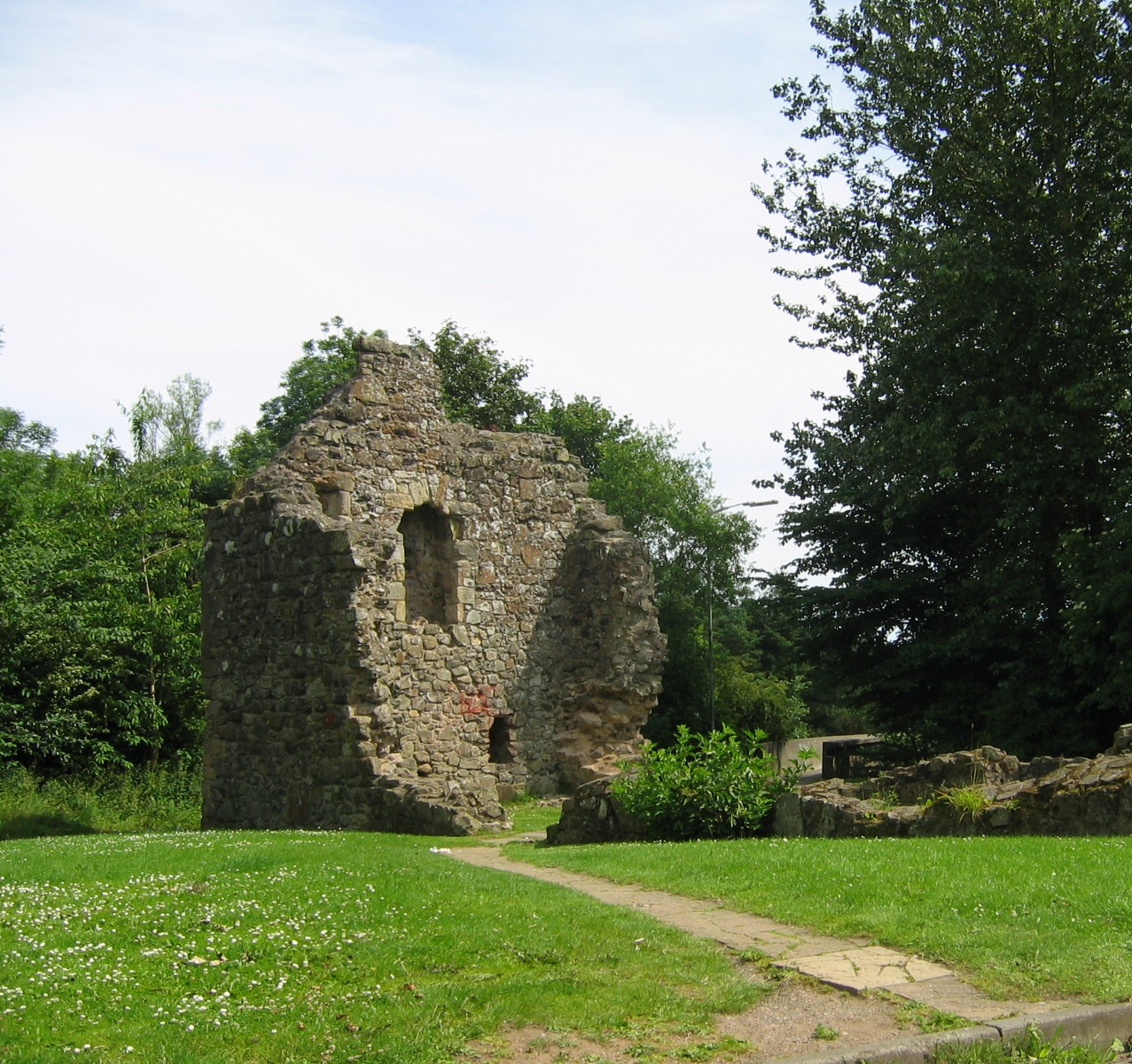
Pitcairn House

Pitcairn House is a ruined 17th century laird's house, located in the modern Collydean residential area of Glenrothes, in Fife, Scotland. Pitcairn House was not, as is sometimes reported, built by the Picts, a people whose culture disappeared from Scotland around the 10th century. The name Pitcairn does, however, have roots in the Pictish language, combining the common prefix pit, meaning a portion of land or farm, with the Gaelic cairn.

The noble family named for the area - the (de) Pitcairnes, recorded as far back as Henry de Pitcairn in 1426 - built the house around 1650. The family produced several eminent figures, chief among them Archibald Pitcairne (1652-1713), physician, religious playwright, and occasional correspondent of Isaac Newton, who owned the house in the early 1700s. By 1793, statistical accounts of the region describe the house as a ruin.

The ruins are approximately 15 by 5.5 metres (49 ft × 18 ft), with the east gable rising to 6 metres (20 ft). The rest of the building has collapsed to the foundations. It is thought that the building was up to three storeys high.

The site was excavated by archaeologists in 1980, and subsequently designated a Scheduled Ancient Monument. A number of finds are now in the Kirkcaldy Museum. A steading and cottages were once associated with the house, although these were demolished when the housing estate was built.

== Bibliography ==
- Reid, Emma (2004). Old Glenrothes- Old buildings, farms and villages in the area which became the New Town of Glenrothes (1st ed.). Cupar: Fife Family History Society.
