= Beaker (archaeology) =

Ceramic or metal drinking vessel

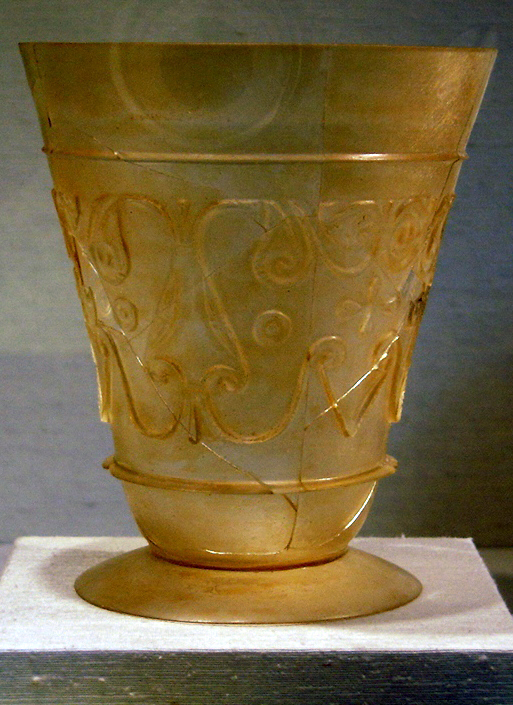
9-10th century beaker from Iran. Blown and relief-cut glass. New York Metropolitan Museum of Art.

In archaeology, a beaker is a small round ceramic or metal cup, a drinking vessel shaped to be held in the hands. It has no handle or spout, and generally no spreading foot (base).

== Term ==
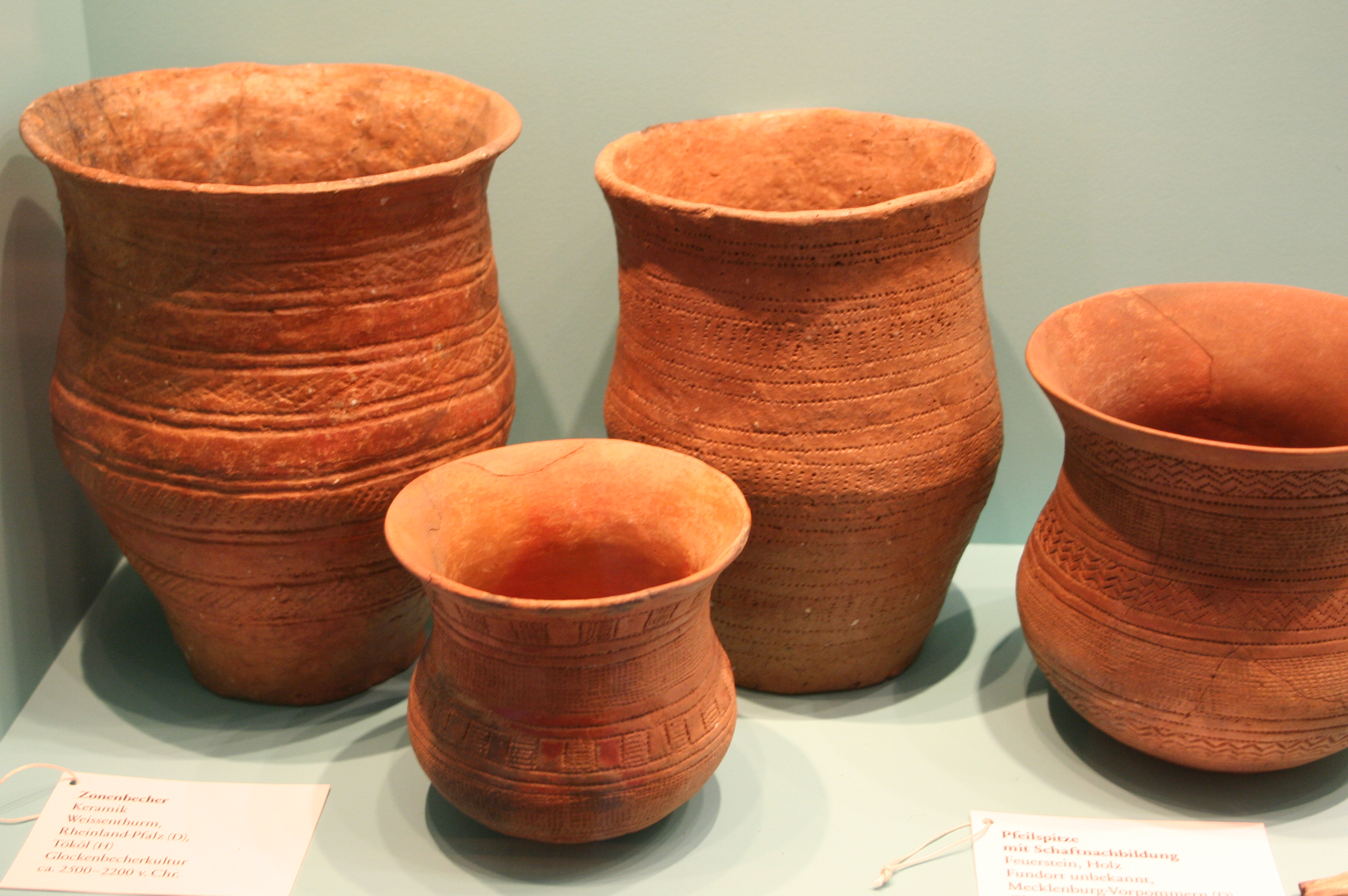
“Typical” bell-beakers at Museum für Vor- und Frühgeschichte, Berlin.

Archaeologists identify several different types including the inverted-bell beaker, the butt beaker, the claw beaker, and the rough-cast beaker.

When used alone “beaker” usually refers to the typical form of pottery cups called inverted-bell beakers associated with the European Bell Beaker culture of the late Neolithic and early Bronze Age.

== Bell beakers ==
The inverted-bell beaker or bell-beaker was first defined as a find-type by Lord Abercromby in the early twentieth century and comes in three distinct forms, the (typical) bell beaker, and the rarer short-necked beaker, and long-necked beaker. There are many variations on these basic types, with inter-grades between them. Bell-beakers have been found from North Africa to southern Scotland and from Portugal to the far east of Europe, but are particularly common in the Rhine valley and the coasts of the North Sea.

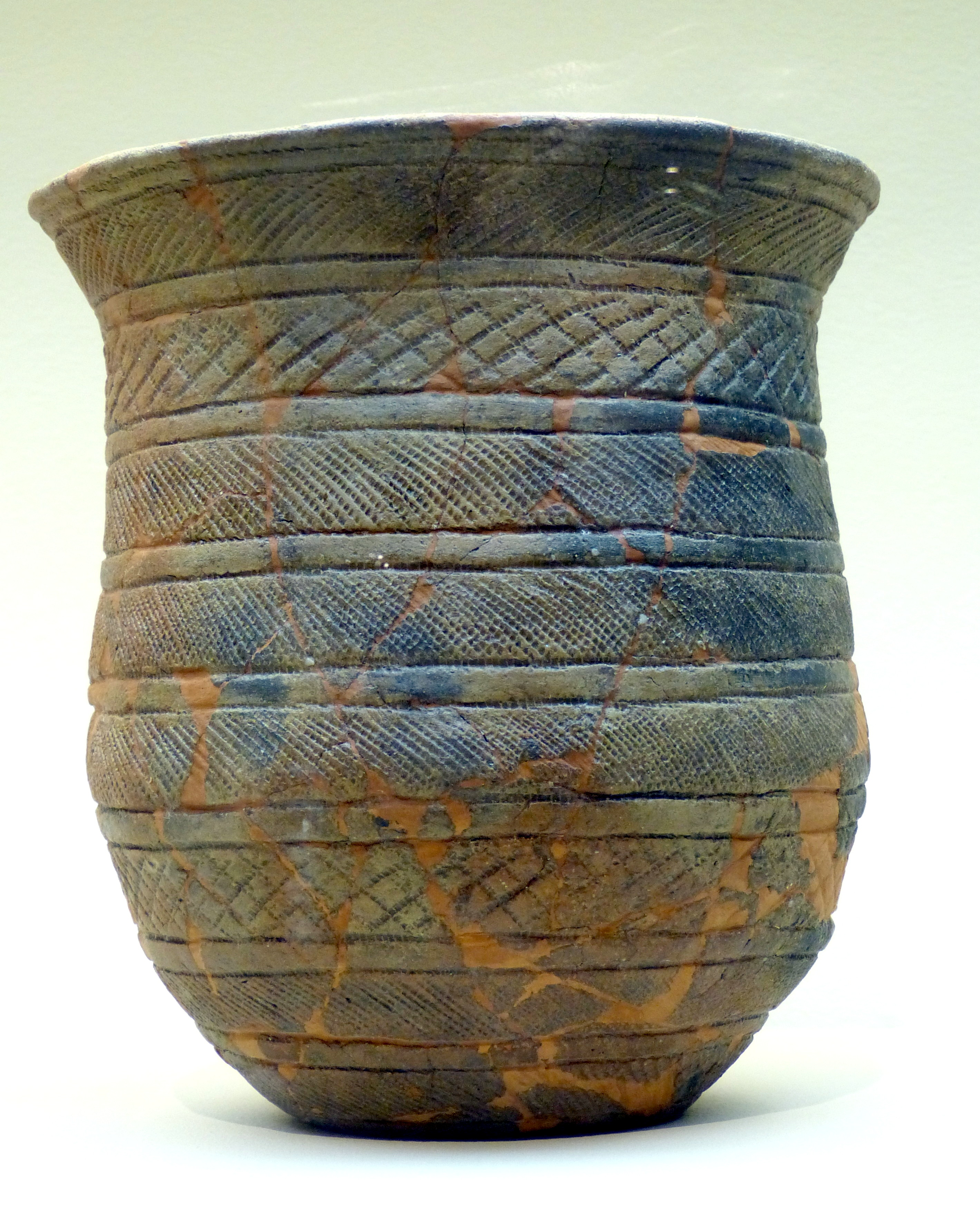
Typical bell-beaker from Atting, now at Gäubodenmuseum Straubing, Bavaria.

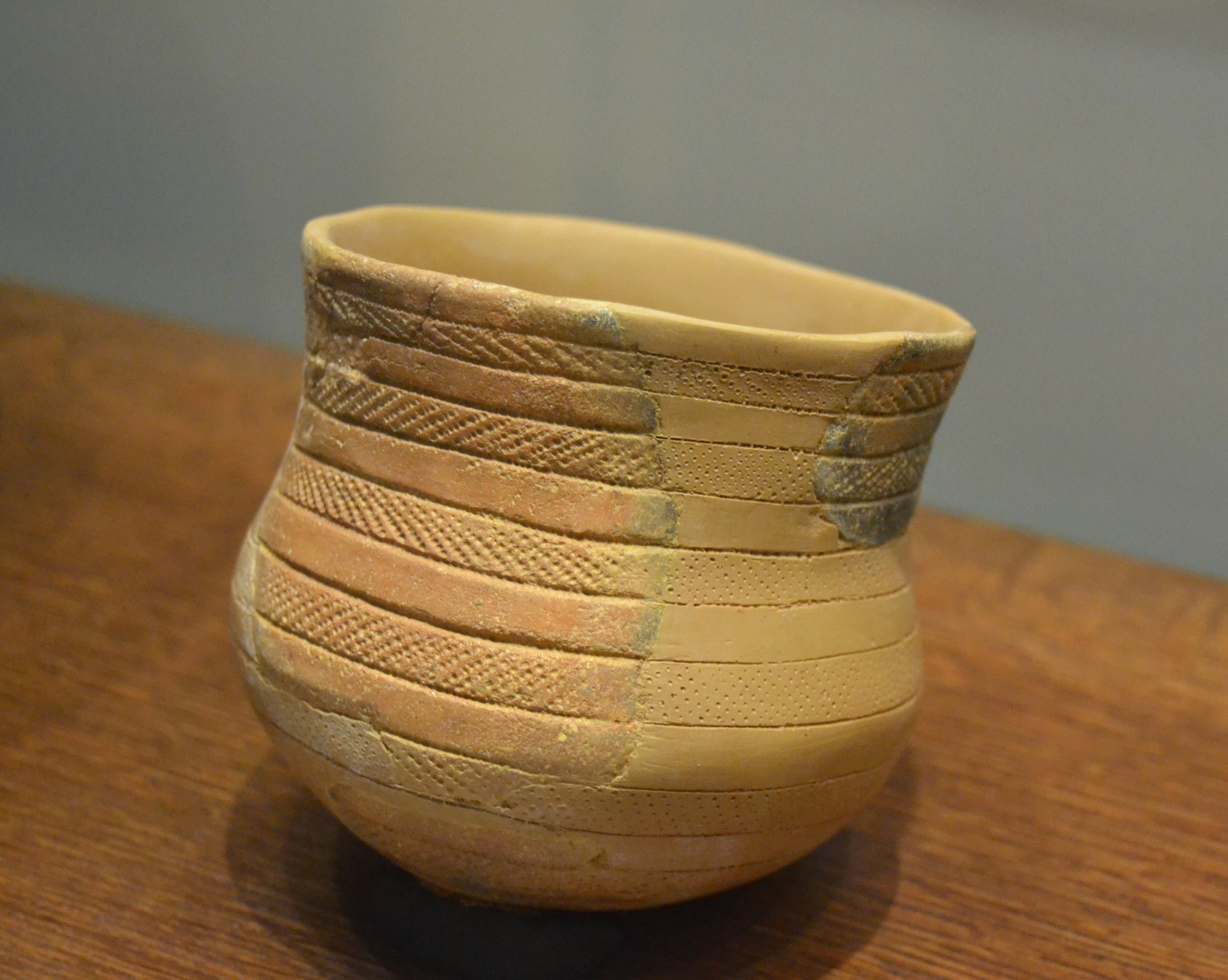
Short-neck bell-beaker from cova de la Recambra, now at Museu Arqueològic de Gandia.

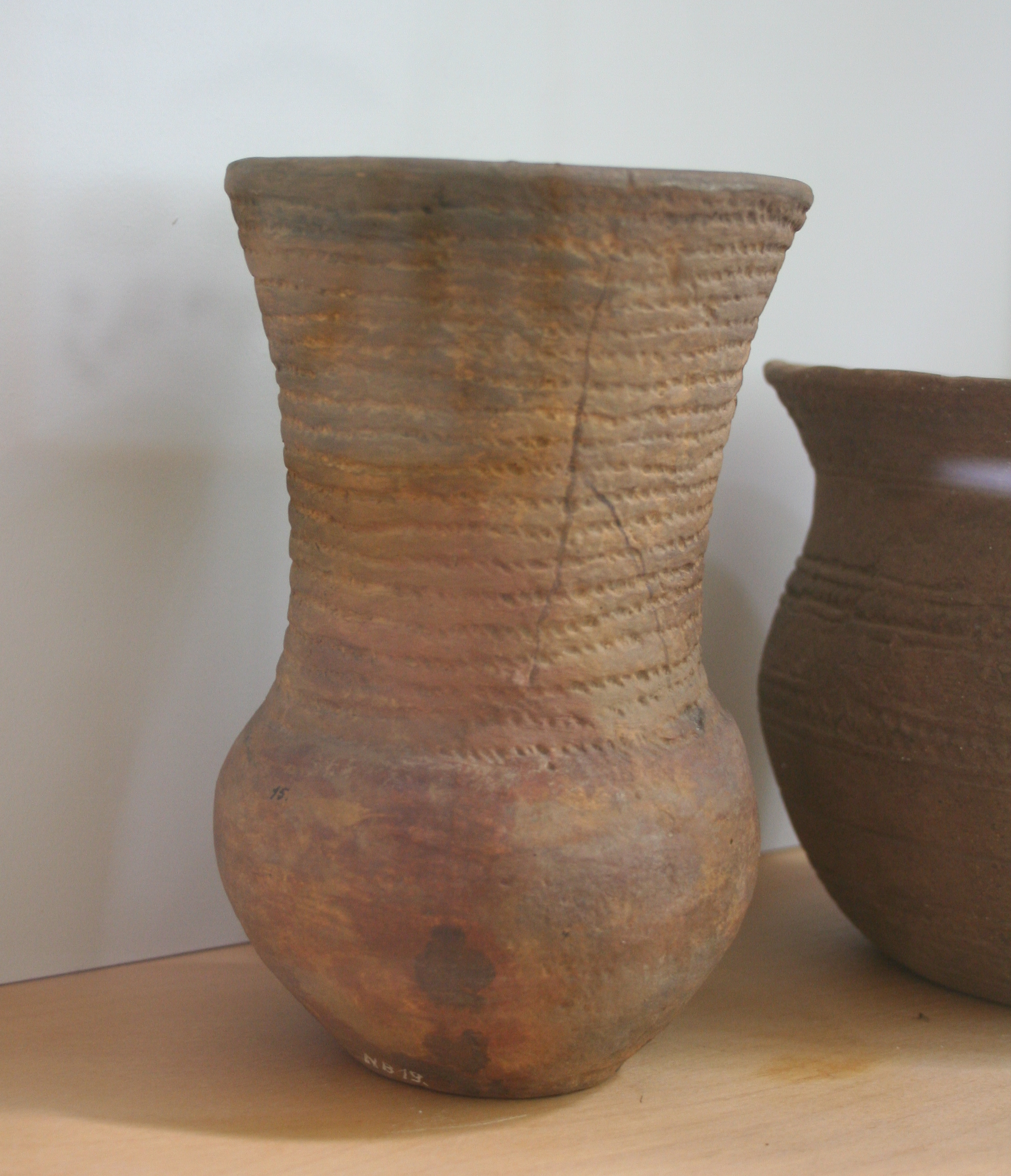
Long-neck bell-beaker, at Steinsburgmuseum.

“Typical” bell beakers appear to be the earliest type and are often covered with decoration made from impressing twisted cord into the unfired clay. When the decoration covers the whole vessel, they are known as all-over corded (AOC) beakers. Where comb designs are used, perhaps along with cord impressions, they are called all-over ornamented (AOO) beakers. Some have a looped handle on one side or a white coloured material pressed into the decoration, contrasting with the usual orange or brown ceramic.

The traditional archeological interpretation is that the original, typical bell-beaker shape was replaced by the short-necked form, which in turn was replaced by long-necked bell-beakers. However, work by Humphrey Case in the 1990s suggests that all three styles were used contemporaneously, with different shapes used for different purposes.

== See also ==
- Beaker (laboratory equipment)

== Sources ==
- Darvill, Tim (2003). Oxford Concise Dictionary of Archaeology. Oxford University Press.
