= Inverted bell curve =

Synonym for, and visual description of bimodial distribution in statistics

In statistics, an inverted bell curve is a term used loosely or metaphorically to refer to a bimodal distribution that falls to a trough between two peaks, rather than (as in a standard bell curve) rising to a single peak and then falling off on both sides.
