= Pitcoudie =

Coordinates: 56°12′35″N 3°10′27″W

Pitcoudie is a housing area in North Glenrothes in the Kingdom of Fife, Scotland. The area comprises 396 terraced and semi-detached houses. Traditionally, a pitcoudie was a donkey, mule or work-horse which ferried coal and slag from the coal mines – spending most of its life underground. The area of Pitcoudie today exists on what was once an extensive range of mining-shafts and pits.

== Education ==
There is also a primary school in the area. Along with Pitteuchar West primary school in the south of Glenrothes, it is one of just two primary schools in Glenrothes to be open-planned.
