= San Clemente wren =

Conservation status
- Extinct

Scientific classification
- Kingdom: Animalia
- Phylum: Chordata
- Class: Aves
- Order: Passeriformes
- Family: Troglodytidae
- Genus: Thryomanes
- Species: T. bewickii
- Subspecies: T. b. leucophrys

Trinomial name
- Thryomanes bewickii leucophrys Anthony, 1895

Synonyms
- Thryothorus leucophrys

Subspecies of bird

The San Clemente wren (Thryomanes bewickii leucophrys) is an extinct subspecies of Bewick's wren. It was mainly distributed on San Clemente Island, off the southern coast of California. The San Clemente wren is extinct, with the last sighting in 1941.

== Description ==
The San Clemente wren measured about 14 cm (5.5 in) in length, with a wingspan of about 5.5 cm (2.2 in). The plumage on top was brown with a grey wash, with a white eye-stripe. The underparts were a mix of grey and white, with the lower tail coverts having black bars.

== Extinction ==
In the early 20th century, the San Clemente wren was reported to be common on San Clemente Island. However, habitat destruction from goats led to the demise of the species by the middle of the century.
