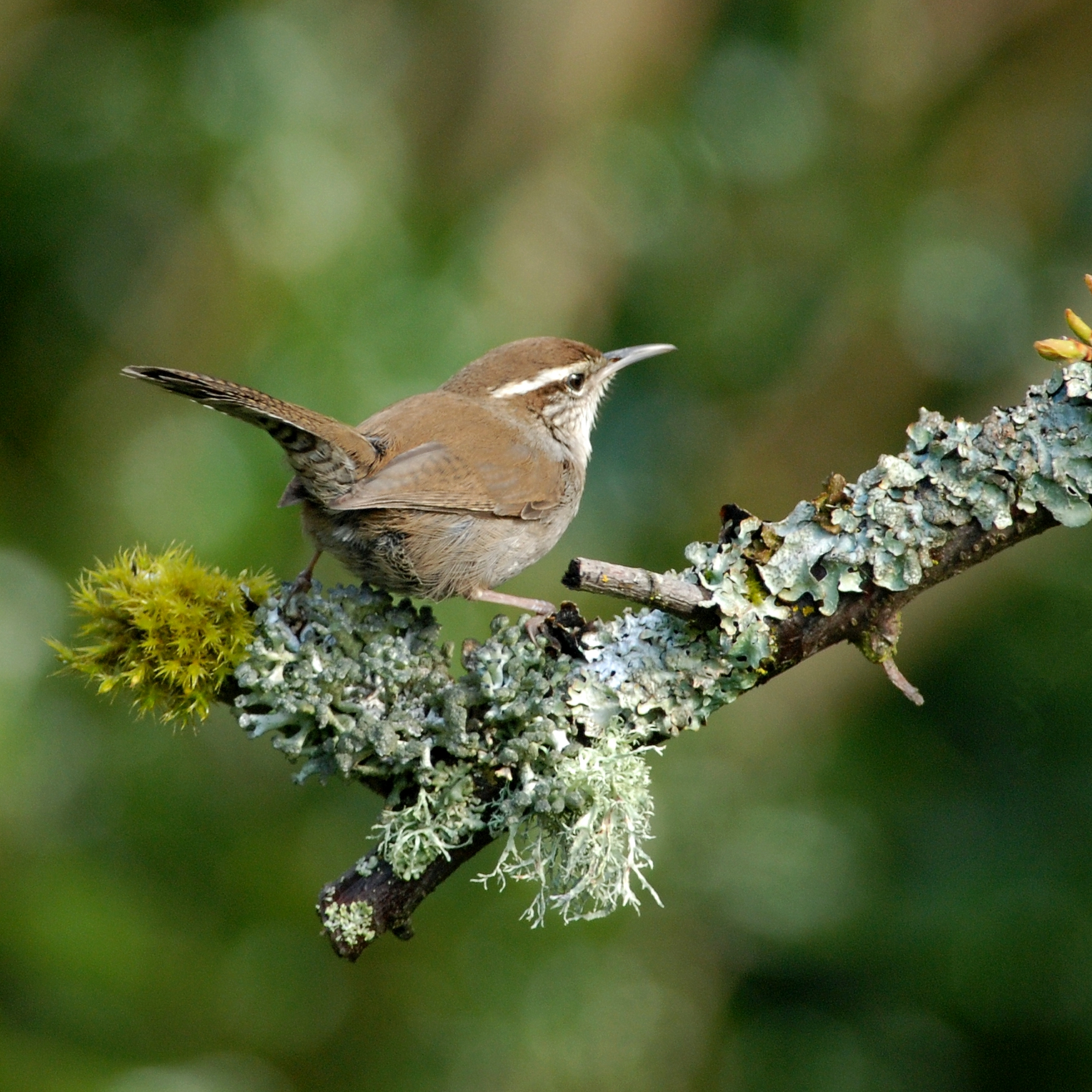

Conservation status
- Least Concern (IUCN 3.1)

Scientific classification
- Kingdom: Animalia
- Phylum: Chordata
- Class: Aves
- Order: Passeriformes
- Family: Troglodytidae
- Genus: Thryomanes; P.L. Sclater, 1862
- Species: T. bewickii

Binomial name
- Thryomanes bewickii (Audubon, 1827)

Subspecies
- 1–2 dozen living, 2 recently extinct; see article text
- Breeding Year-round Nonbreeding

Synonyms
- Thryomanes leucophrys; Thryothorus bewickii; Thryothorus brevicauda; Thryothorus brevicaudus; Thryothorus bairdi

Audio

= Bewick's wren =

Species of bird

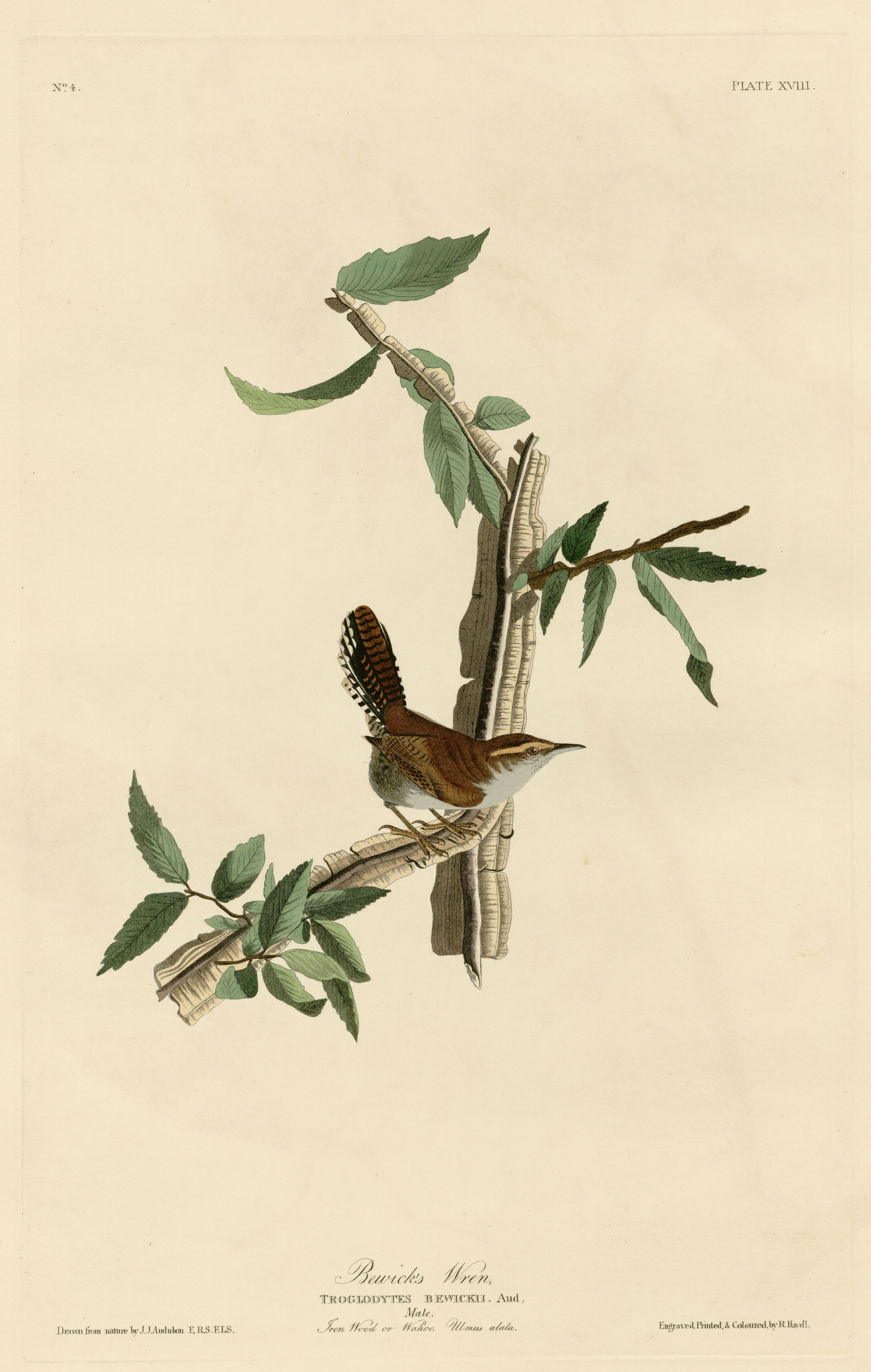
Illustration from Audubon's The Birds of America

Bewick's wren (Thryomanes bewickii) is a wren native to North America. It is the only species placed in the genus Thryomanes. At about 14 cm (5.5 in) long, it is grey-brown above, white below, with a long white eyebrow. While similar in appearance to the Carolina wren, it has a long tail that is tipped in white. The song is loud and melodious, much like the song of other wrens. It lives in thickets, brush piles and hedgerows, open woodlands and scrubby areas, often near streams. It eats insects and spiders, which it gleans from vegetation or finds on the ground.

Its historic range was from southern British Columbia, Nebraska, southern Ontario, and southwestern Pennsylvania, Maryland, south to Mexico, Arkansas and the northern Gulf States. However, it is now extremely rare east of the Mississippi River.

== Taxonomy ==
In 1827, the American ornithologist John James Audubon included an illustration of Bewick's wren under the binomial name Troglodytes bewickii in his The Birds of America. In the companion Ornithological Biography, published four years later, Audubon explained that he had shot the specimen near St. Francisville, Louisiana in 1821 and had chosen the specific epithet bewickii in honour of his friend the engraver Thomas Bewick. Bewick's wren is now the only species placed in the genus Thryomanes that was introduced by the English zoologist Philip Sclater in 1862.

The Socorro wren was formerly also placed in Thryomanes, but is now known to be a close relative of the house wren complex, as indicated by biogeography and mtDNA NADH dehydrogenase subunit 2 sequence analysis, whereas Thryomanes seems not too distant from the Carolina wren.

=== Subspecies ===
Fifteen subspecies are recognised of which two are now extinct. Subspecies can be distinguished by the small differences in the color of the dorsal feathers but this can be difficult for museum specimens as the colors tend to change after a few years of storage.

- T. b. calophonus Oberholser, 1898 – southwest Canada and northwest USA
- T. b. drymoecus Oberholser, 1898 – west Canada. Includes T. b. atrestus.
- T. b. marinensis Grinnell, 1910 – coastal northwest California
- T. b. spilurus (Vigors, 1839) – coastal central California
- † T. b. leucophrys (Anthony, 1895) – Extinct, formerly San Clemente Island, California
- T. b. charienturus Oberholser, 1898 – southern California and northwest Baja California
- T. b. cerroensis (Anthony, 1897) – west central Baja California
- T. b. magdalenensis Huey, 1942 – southwest Baja California
- † T. b. brevicauda Ridgway, 1876 – Extinct, formerly Guadalupe Island, Mexico
- T. b. eremophilus Oberholser, 1898 – interior southwest USA to central Mexico
- T. b. cryptus Oberholser, 1898 – west Kansas, west Oklahoma and central, east Texas and northeast Mexico
- T. b. pulichi (Phillips, AR, 1986) – east Kansas and Oklahoma
- T. b. sadai (Phillips, AR, 1986) – south Texas (southern USA) to central Tamaulipas (northeast Mexico)
- T. b. mexicanus (Deppe, 1830) – central and south Mexico. Includes T. b. murinus.
- T. b. bewickii (Audubon, 1827) – Nominate subspecies, central and east central USA. Includes T. b. altus.

== Description ==
Bewick's wren has an average length of 13 cm (5.1 in) an average weight of 8–12 g (0.28–0.42 oz), and a wingspan of 18 cm (7.1 in). Its plumage is brown on top and light grey underneath, with a white stripe above each eye. Its beak is long, slender, and slightly curved. Its most distinctive feature is its long tail with black bars and white corners. It moves its tail around frequently, making this feature even more obvious for observers.

Juveniles look similar to adults, with only a few key differences. Their beaks are usually shorter and stockier. In addition, their underbelly might feature some faint speckling. Males and females are very similar in appearance.

=== Vocalizations ===
Bewick's wrens, like many wrens, are very vocal. Both females and males make short calls while foraging and both use a harsh scolding call when agitated. Males also sing in order to attract mates and protect their territory. The song is broken into two or three individual parts; one individual male may exhibit up to twenty-two different variations on the song pattern, and may even throw in a little ventriloquism to vary it even further. A male wren learns its song from neighboring males, so its song will be different from its father's.

=== Geographic variation ===
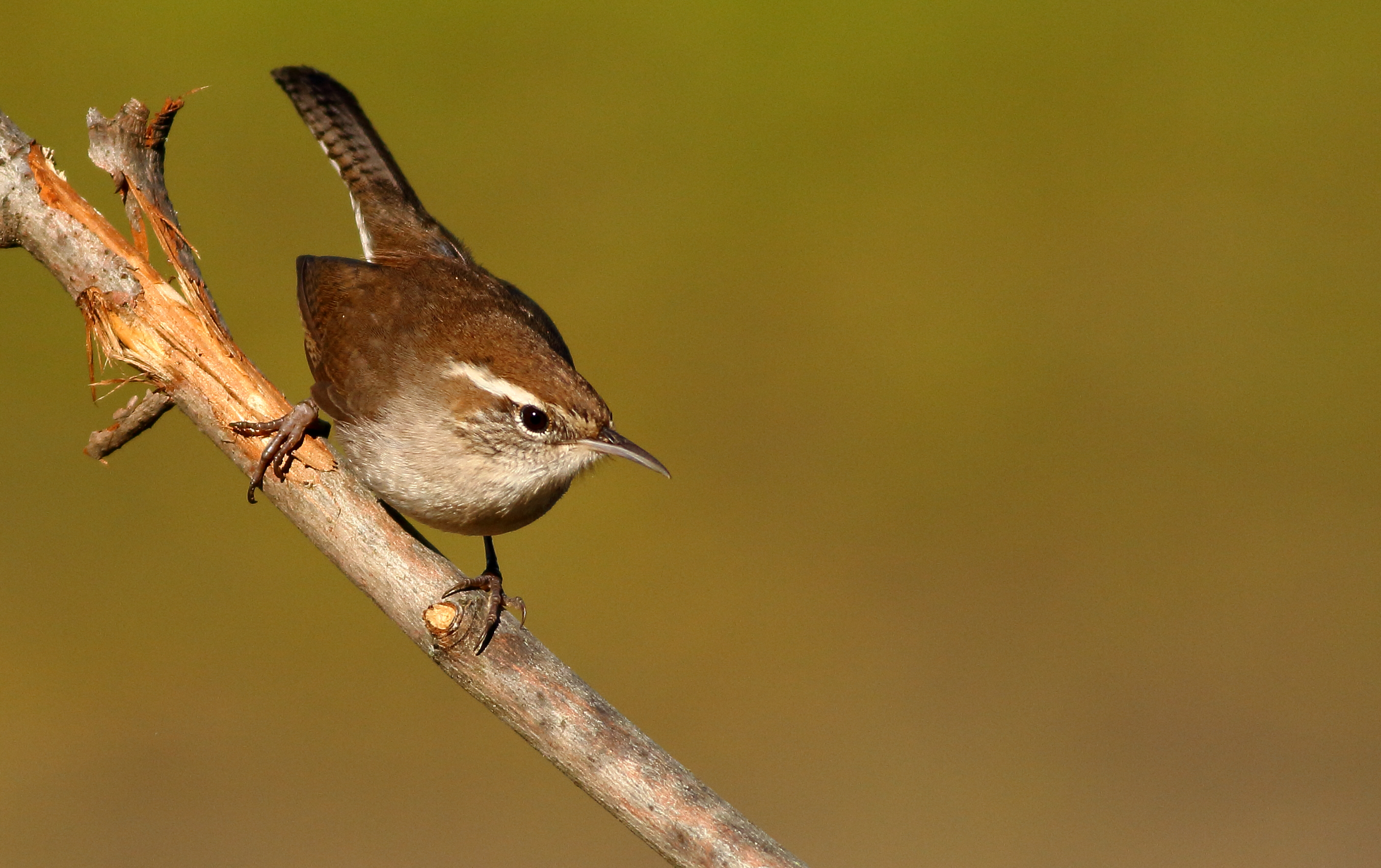
Bewick's Wren in Sacramento, California

Geographic differences have been observed in the appearance of Bewick's wren. Eastern populations, prior to their decline, were described as being more colorful, such as having a reddish tint to its brown feathers. Pacific populations are described as being darker in appearance, while populations in the Southwest are described as having a grayer plumage.

Geographic differences have also been noted in the song of Bewick's wrens. Each regional population of Bewick's wrens have distinctive vocalizations, in particular their call notes. Pacific populations sing notably more complicated songs than Southwestern populations. Eastern populations were also noted to be excellent singers.

== Distribution and habitat ==
Bewick's wren once had a range that extended throughout much of the United States and Mexico and parts of Canada. It used to be fairly common in the Midwest and in the Appalachian Mountains, but it is now extremely rare east of the Mississippi River. It is still found along the Pacific Coast from Baja California to British Columbia, in Mexico, and in a significant portion of the Southwest, including Texas, Arizona, New Mexico, and Oklahoma. Western populations do not tend to migrate. Eastern populations, prior to their decline, used to migrate from its northern range to the Gulf Coast.

The preferred habitat of Bewick's wren is that of arid open woodlands and brush-filled areas such as hillsides and uplands, but will reside in humid areas locally (Subtropical and Temperate zones). They are more common than house wrens in drier habitats, such as those found in the Southwest. In California, Bewick's wrens inhabit a shrubland area called chaparral.

== Behavior ==
Bewick's Wren feeding young and cleaning the nestbox

=== Feeding ===
Bewick's wrens are insect eaters. They glean insects and insect eggs from vegetation, including the trunks of trees. They typically do not feed on vegetation higher than 3 meters, but they will forage on the ground. Bewick's wrens are capable of hanging upside down in order to acquire food, such as catching an insect on the underside of a branch. When it catches an insect, it kills the insect prior to swallowing it whole. Bewick's wrens will repeatedly wipe their beaks on its perch after a meal.

Bewick's wrens will visit backyard feeders. They will eat suet, peanut hearts, hulled sunflower seeds, and mealworms. Like many insect-eating birds, Bewick's wren widens its diet to include seeds in the winter.

=== Breeding ===
Courtship begins with the male singing from its perch. It will occasionally pause its song in order to chase its competitors. Bewick's wrens form monogamous pairs that will then forage together. The male wren begins building the nest in a cavity or birdhouse, with the female joining in later. The nest is constructed from twigs and other plant materials and is often lined with feathers. The nest is cup-shaped and located in a nook or cavity of some kind. It lays 5–7 eggs, which are white with brown spots. Bewick's wren produces two broods in a season. Pairs are more or less monogamous when it comes to breeding, but go solitary throughout the winter.

== Status and conservation ==
In 2016, Bewick's wren was listed as least concern on the IUCN Red List of threatened species due to the size of its range and estimates of its population size. However, ornithologists have noted a severe decline in its eastern range and parts of its western range. In particular, it has virtually disappeared from east of the Mississippi. In 1984, the state of Maryland classified Bewick's wren as endangered under its Maryland Endangered Species Act of 1971. Despite this classification, no breeding pairs of Bewick's wrens are known to remain in Maryland. In 2014, the North American Bird Conservation Initiative placed the eastern Bewick's wren on its watch list.

Several theories have been proposed to explain its decline in its eastern range, including pesticide use and competition from other bird species. The most likely reason seems to be competition from house wrens. House wrens compete with Bewick's wrens for similar nesting sites. House wrens will destroy both the nests and eggs of Bewick's wrens. The reforestation of once open land has also negatively impacted the eastern Bewick's wrens.

In California, habitat loss due to development has impacted Bewick's wren. In San Diego, development in the canyons has led to the gradual decline of native bird species, including Bewick's wren.

In Washington, development has actually benefited Bewick's wren, leading to an increase in its population. However, this has coincided with the decline of the Pacific wren thanks to increased competition between the two species.
