= Quendale =

Settlement and coastal district in the southwest area of Dunrossness

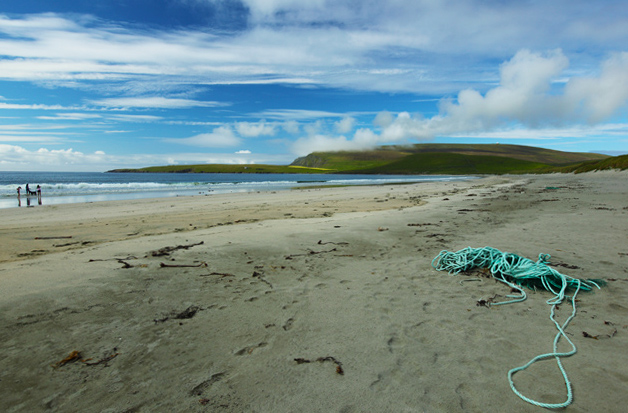
Quendale Beach and Bay

Quendale is a settlement and coastal district in the southwest area of Dunrossness in Shetland. Quendale beach is a long beach formed at the north end of the Bay of Quendale. Quendale beach is the longest beach in Shetland and the beach has extensive sand dunes.

== History ==
In 1588, the Captain and crew of the shipwrecked Spanish Armada ship El Gran Grifón were landed in Quendale after having been rescued off the rocks of Stroms Hellier.

In the 1940s and 1950s, the area immediately NE of Quendale farm was the site of a military camp.

In January 1993, the oil tanker MV Braer grounded just off the area, hitting rocks in Quendale Bay that caused significant oil pollution along the coastal environment.

== Fishing ==
The Annual Reports of the Fishery Board for Scotland provide an insight into fishing in Quendale in the years before the First World War.

Fishery Statistics

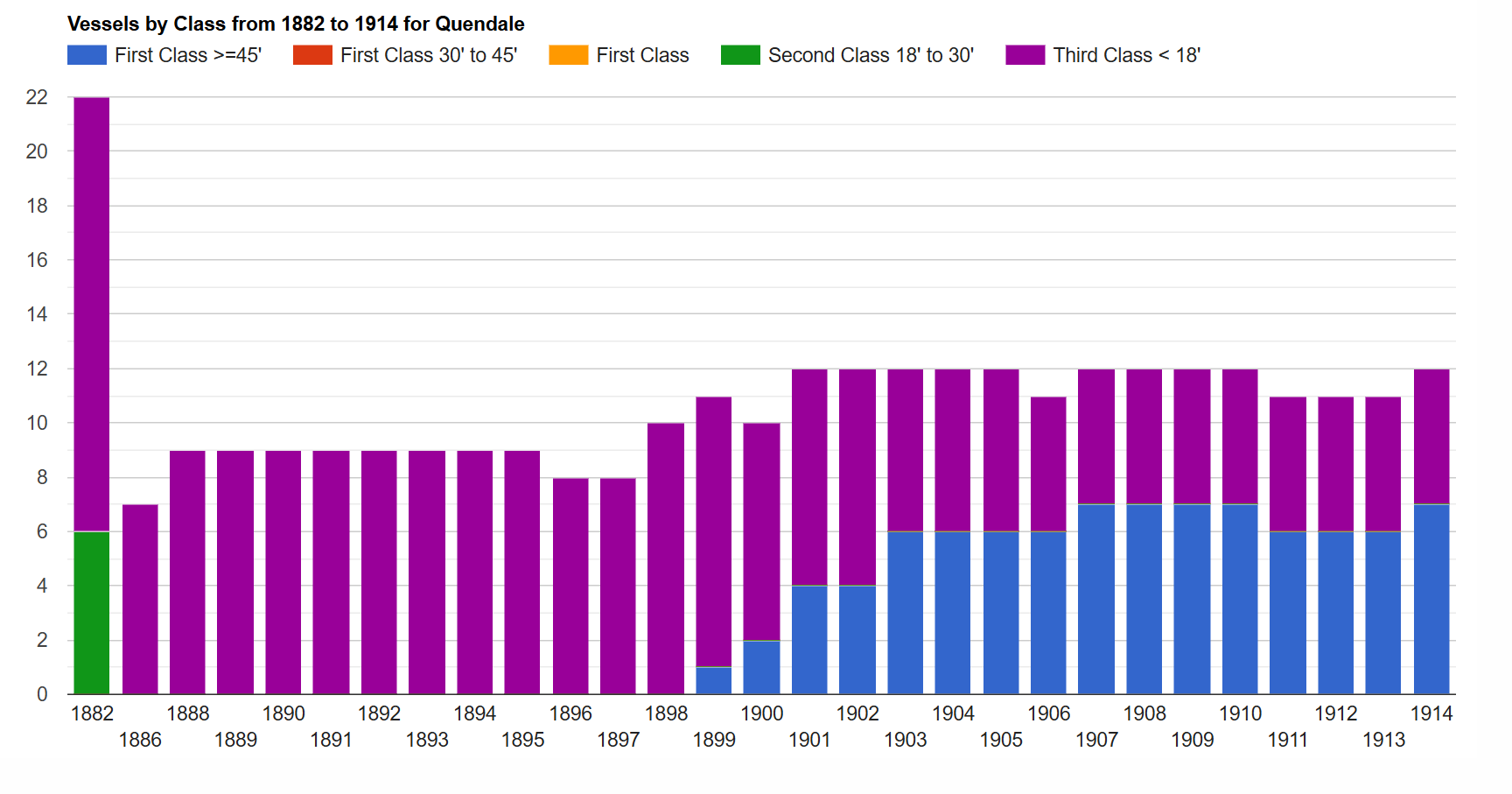
Vessels by class

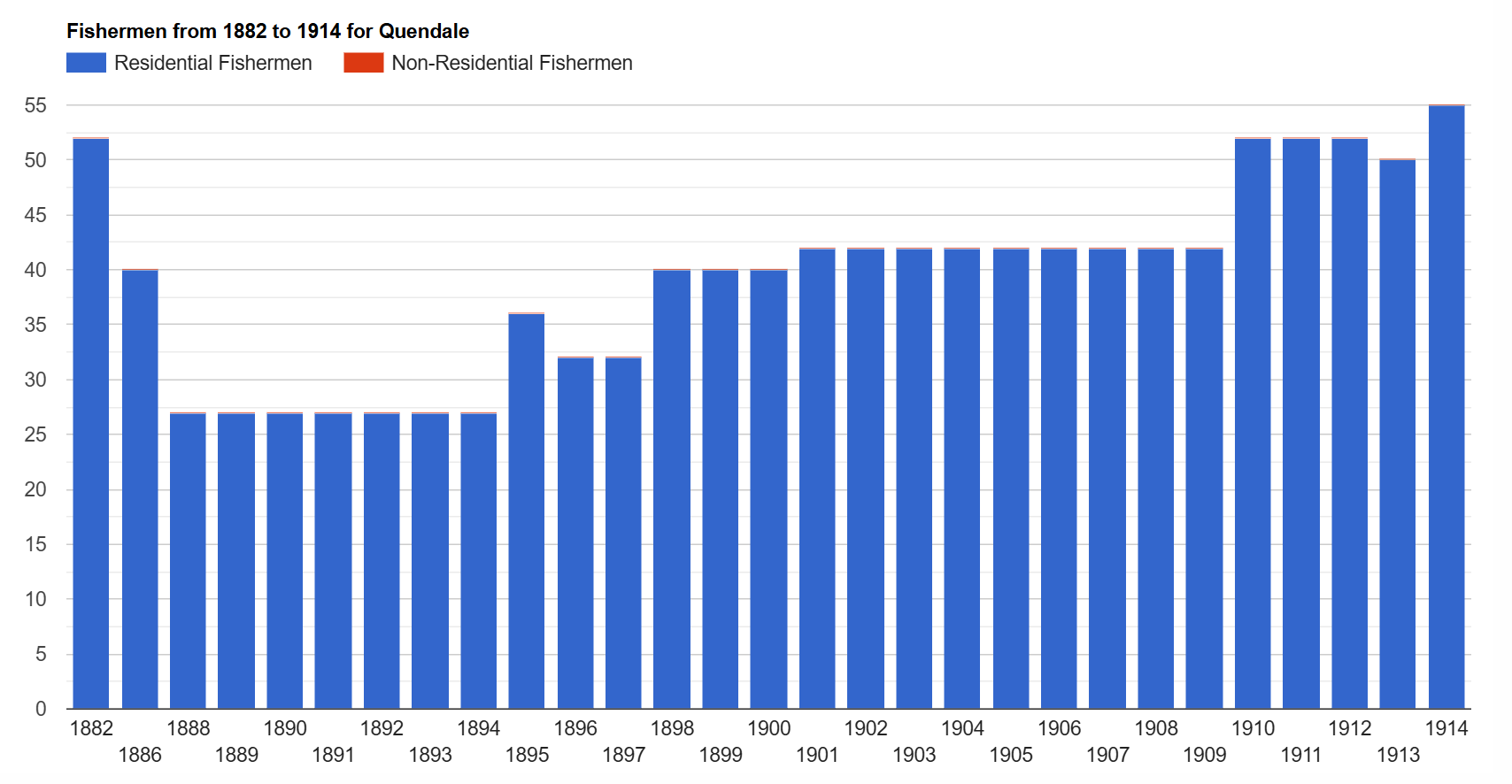
Fishermen

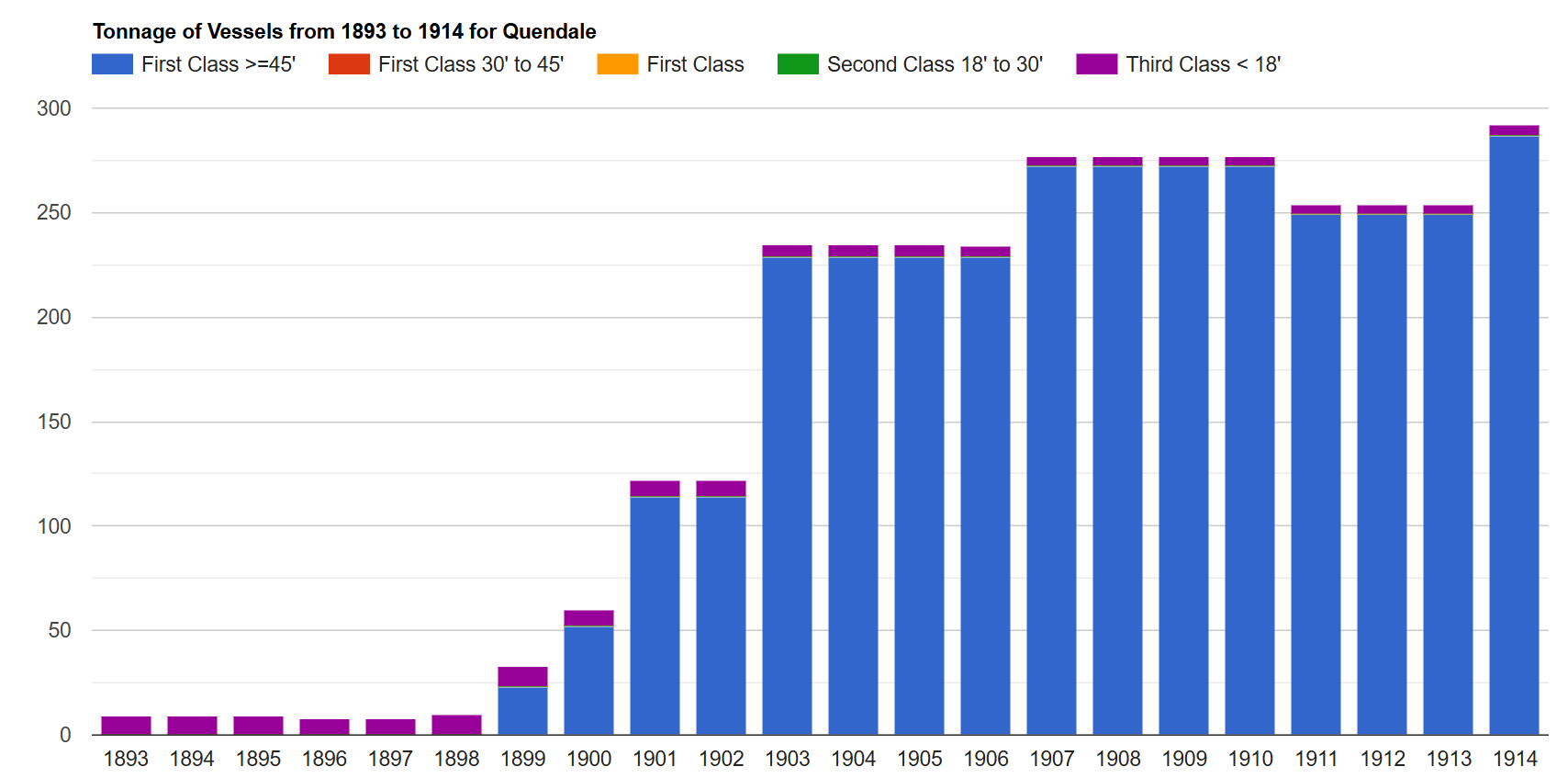
Tonnage of vessels

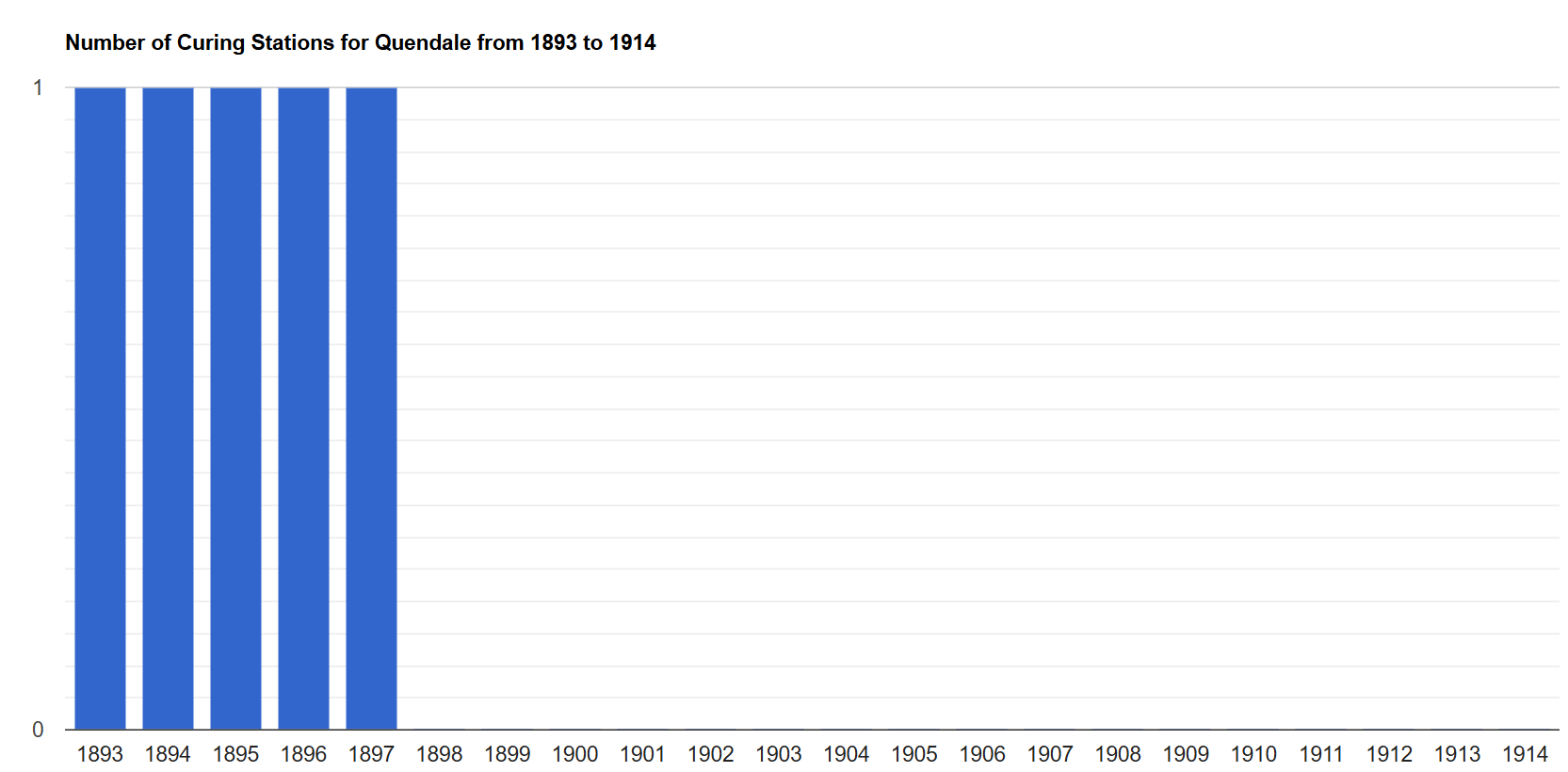
Number of curing stations

== Sites of interest ==
Cross Kirk, is a formed ruined church site and burial ground located just north of Quendale beach beside the Eel burn. The church was a collegiate church that dated to at least 1590 but was abandoned about 1790 due to the encroachment of sand.

Quendale Haa is a former laird's house in ashlar stone that is now abandoned. The house was the seat of the Grierson family. The house itself was built circa 1800 and is now Category B listed.

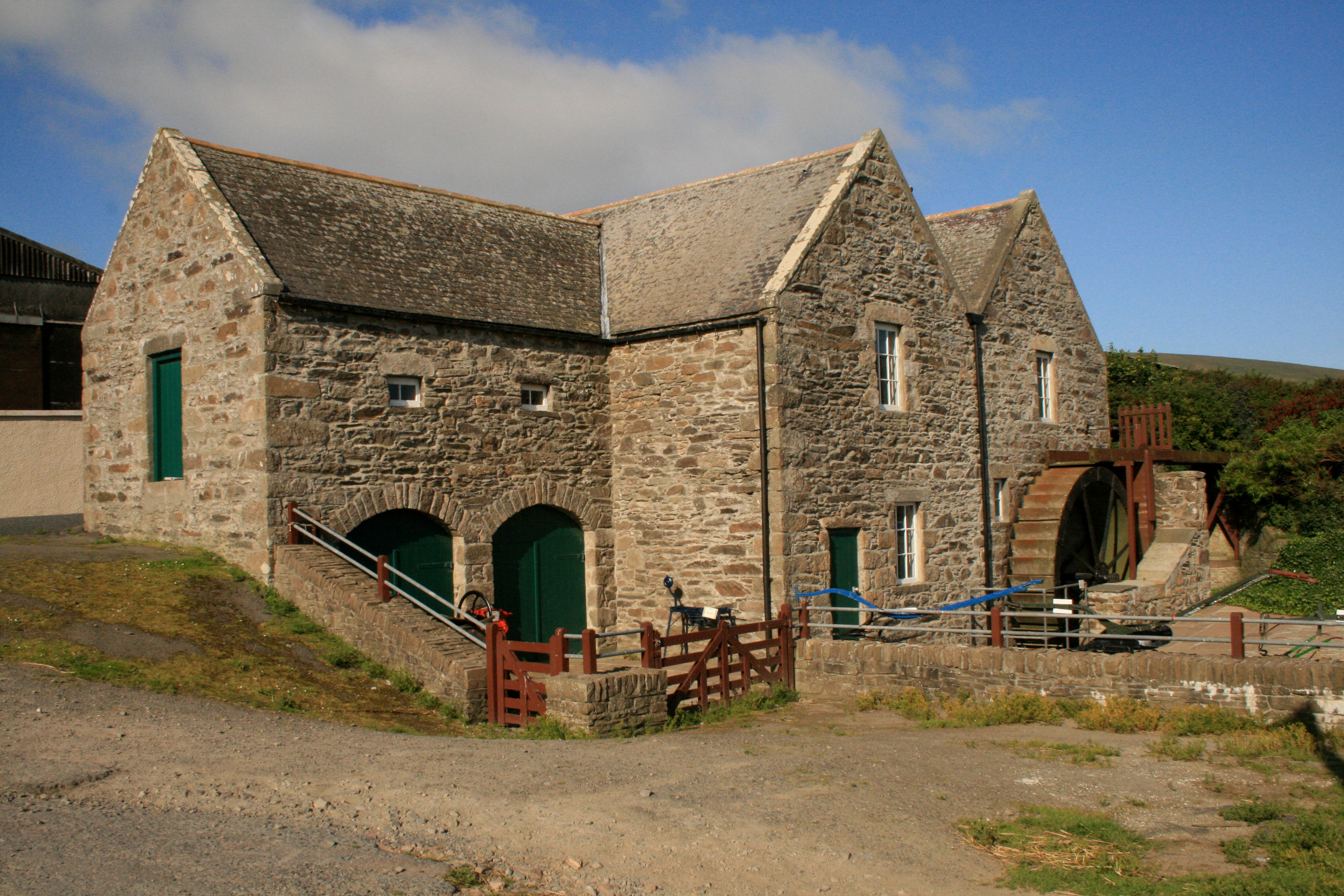
Quendale Water Mill, a museum

There is an abandoned farmstead to the north-west of the current farm named East Nifland (beside the valley), comprising several unroofed buildings and a former kiln.

=== Quendale Water Mill ===
Quendale Water Mill is a working museum mill. The mill was built in 1867 and is fitted with an 8-spoke iron overshot water wheel that rotates with water from a wooden adquaduct. The mill was originally used as a commercial grain mill but fell out of use. It was restored to working order in the 20th century and became a museum with financial assistance from the Shetland Amenity Trust. It is open to visitors. It is a Category A listed building.
