= Sydney Wignall =

Spy, mountaineer and archaeologist (1922–2012)

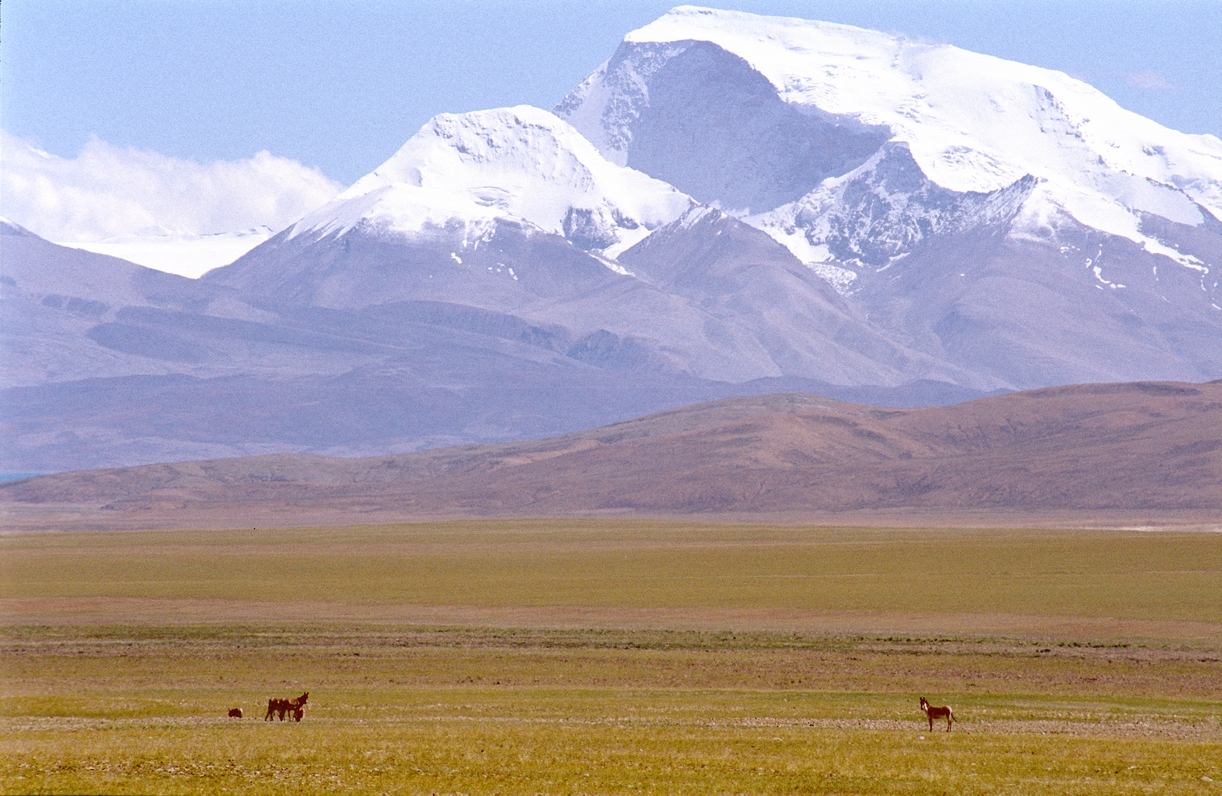
Gurla Mandhata

Sydney Wignall (16 October 1922 – 16 April 2012) was a British marine archaeologist, climber, explorer and spy.

== Biography ==
He was born in Wallasey on the Wirral as the son of a cobbler, the youngest of four children. He attended Wallasey Oldershaw grammar school, but left at 16 with no qualifications and later became an apprentice electrical engineer. By 1955 he was living in Colwyn bay.

== Climbing and spying ==
He led a Welsh team of climbers to climb the 7,694-meters-high Gurla Mandhata, Tibet, in 1955, was sponsored by Time Magazine and the Liverpool Post. Unknown by his fellow climbers he was spying for the Indian Army intelligence to spy on the military developments in this part of Tibet. He later wrote about his experiences in the book Spy on the Roof of the World. From the climb he would be able to view the Chinese military build up and make notes on its size and scale. Wignall and his party were captured by the Chinese army and held prisoner for two months. During this period the group suffered frostbite and dysentery and were beaten by the guards. There was also psychological torture, but all attempts to break them failed, and they never confessed or released any information. Wignall successfully passed on the information, but never returned to the area or to climbing again.

== Marine archaeology ==
During Wignall's career as a marine archaeologist he made a number of significant finds and contributions to the field.

In 1962 he was a civilian under-water photographer working on an RAF dive of a Roman galley near Sicily. He located the vice-flagship of the Spanish Armada the Santa Maria de la Rosa in 1968, which was off the coast of Ireland. He was also involved in searching for Sir Francis Drake's lead coffin, and the American warship Bonhomme Richard which sank in 1779, the submarine Resurgam off Rhyl, and the Confederate blockade-runner Lelia, lost north of Prestatyn in 1865.

The search and diving difficulties involved with the Santa Maria de la Rosa was captured in the book Full Fathom Five: Wrecks of the Spanish Armada by Dr Martin. In 1970 he helped with the wreck of Spanish Armada ship El Gran Grifón off Fair Isle excavated with Colin Martin. Wignall also made contribution through the analysis of finds from his dives. He worked out that the Spanish Amarda shot were weakened in the manufacturing process. The sudden cooling involved weakened and making the shot unstable in flight. Many of the details of his work are stored at Bangor University archives.
