= Fair Isle =

Southernmost Shetland Island, Scotland

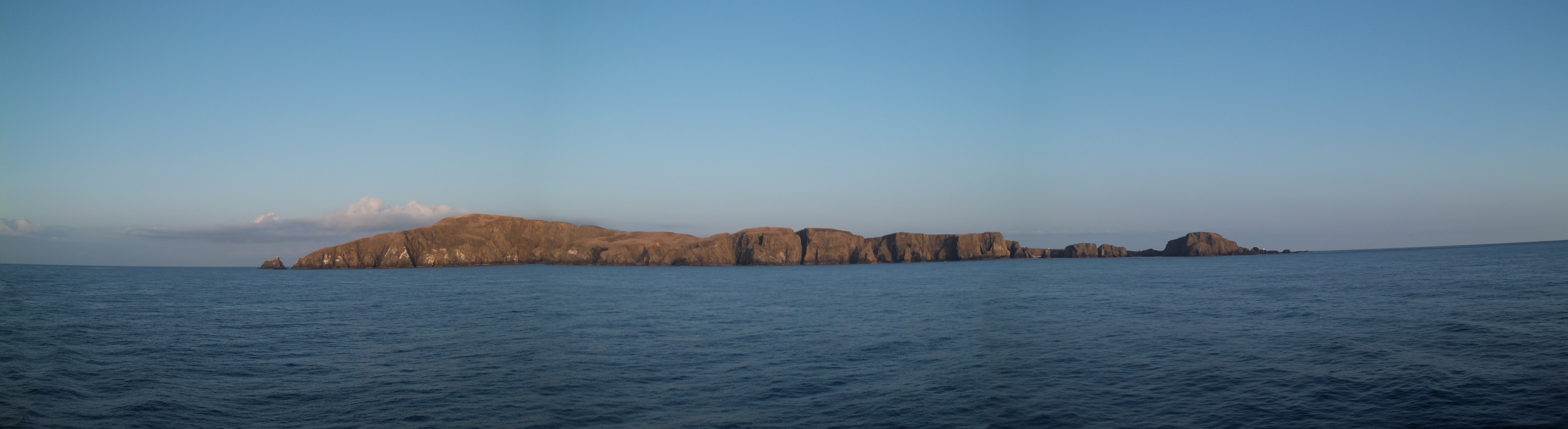
- Fair Isle viewed from the west

Location
- Fair Isle shown within Shetland
- OS grid reference: HZ209717
- Coordinates: 59°32′30″N 1°37′21″W

Name
- Name meaning: in English misunderstood as "fair island" or possibly "far-off isle" or "sheep isle". The Norse origin Friðarey means literally "calm/peaceful isle" or "island (ey) of tranquility (frið(u)r)".
- Old Norse name: Friðarøy/Friðarey

Physical geography
- Island group: Shetland
- Area: 768 ha (1,900 acres)
- Area rank: 61
- Highest elevation: Ward Hill 217 m (712 ft)

Administration
- Council area: Shetland Islands Council
- Country: Scotland
- Sovereign state: United Kingdom

Demographics
- Population: 44
- Population rank: 55
- Population density: 5.7/km^{2} (15/sq mi)
- Largest settlement: Stonybreck
- Fair Isle North Lighthouse; Skroo
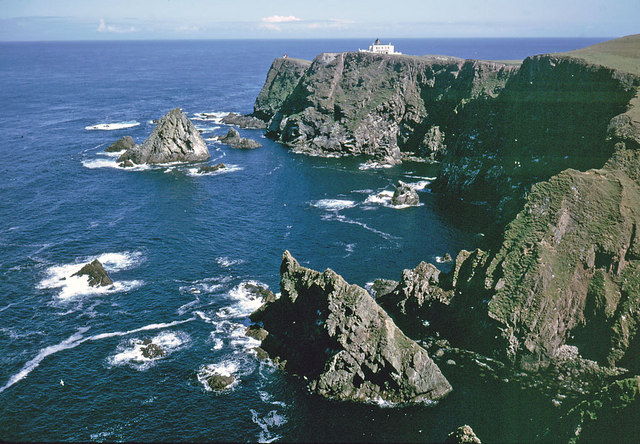
- The view eastwards towards the Fair Isle North Lighthouse
- Coordinates: 59.552142°N 1.609519°W
- Constructed: 1892
- Designed by: David Alan Stevenson, Charles Alexander Stevenson
- Construction: masonry tower
- Automated: 1983
- Height: 14 m (46 ft)
- Shape: cylindrical tower with balcony and lantern
- Markings: white tower, black lantern, ochre trim
- Operator: Northern Lighthouse Board
- Heritage: category B listed building
- Fog signal: 3 blasts every 45 s
- First lit: 1 November 1892
- Focal height: 80 m (260 ft)
- Lens: hyperradiant Fresnel lens
- Light source: engine generator
- Intensity: 204,000 cd
- Range: 22 nmi (41 km)
- Characteristic: Fl (2) W 30s.
- Fair Isle South Lighthouse; Skadden
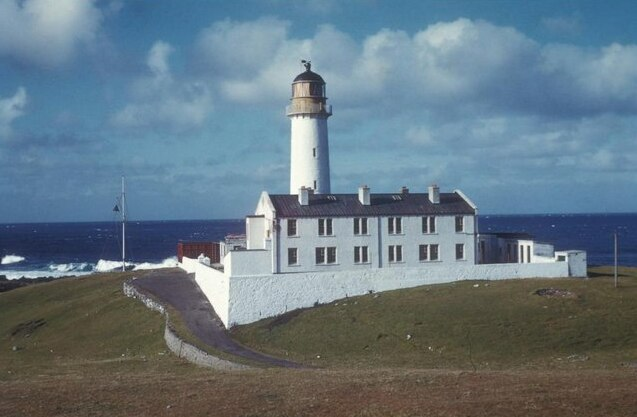
- Coordinates: 59.513906°N 1.652611°W
- Constructed: 1892
- Designed by: David Alan Stevenson, Charles Alexander Stevenson
- Construction: masonry tower
- Automated: 1998
- Height: 26 m (85 ft)
- Shape: cylindrical tower with balcony and lantern
- Markings: white tower, black lantern, ochre trim
- Operator: Northern Lighthouse Board
- Heritage: category B listed building
- Fog signal: 2 blasts every 60 s
- Focal height: 32 m (105 ft)
- Light source: wind power; engine generator
- Range: 22 nmi (41 km)
- Characteristic: Fl(4) W 30s, Fl(2) W 30s

Fair Isle (Shaetlan pronunciation: [ˌfɛər ˈaɪɫ] fair EYEL; Old Norse: Friðarey) is the southernmost of the Shetland Islands, Scotland. It is situated at the approximate midpoint between the southern tip of Mainland in Shetland and North Ronaldsay, the northernmost of the Orkney Islands, in an area bordering the North Sea and the Atlantic Ocean known as the Fair Isle Gap.

As the most remote inhabited island in the United Kingdom, Fair Isle is known for its wild bird observatory, historic shipwrecks, Scottish and Shetland-style traditional music, and its traditional style of knitting, also called "Fair Isle". The island has been owned by the National Trust for Scotland since 1954.

== History ==
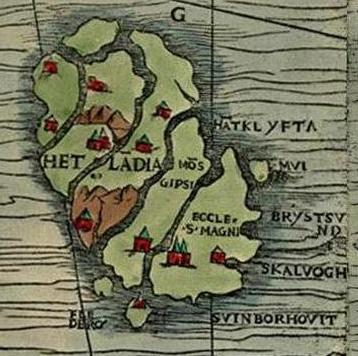
Fair Isle (Feedero) depicted close to Shetland (Hetlandia) on the 1539 Carta Marina

Fair Isle has been occupied since Neolithic times, which is remarkable given the lack of raw materials on the island, although it is surrounded by rich fishing waters. There are two known Iron Age sites: a promontory fort at Landberg and the foundations of a house underlying an early Christian settlement at Kirkigeo.

Most of the place names date from after the 9th-century Norse settlement of the Northern Isles. By that time the croft lands had clearly been in use for centuries.

Between the 9th and 15th centuries, Fair Isle was a Norwegian possession. In 1469, Shetland, along with Orkney, was part of the dowry of the King of Denmark's daughter, Margaret, on her marriage to James III of Scotland.

On 27 September 1588 the flagship of the Spanish Armada, El Gran Grifón, was shipwrecked in the cove of Stroms Hellier, forcing its 300 sailors to spend six weeks living with the islanders. The wreck was discovered in 1970. A first hand account of the Spanish on Fair Isle comes from a diary of an unknown Spaniard from the El Gran Grifón (translation by Mike Shepherd).

We settled in a shelter we found on the day we ran into this great danger, which was 27 September 1588. We found it populated by up to seventeen neighbours in small houses that were more like huts than anything else; a savage people. They eat mostly fish and they do not have bread, or very little, and cakes baked from barley. They cook these over fires fed with fuel taken from the earth, which they call turba [peat]. They have cattle, quite a lot for them because they seldom eat meat. They herd cows, sheep, and pigs; the cows sustain them and they make more money from the milk and butter. They get wool from the sheep for their clothes. They are very dirty people. They are not Christian but not quite heretics either. Their minister comes from an island to preach to them once a year. They do not like this but cannot do anything about it. It is a shame. Three hundred men landed on this island without any food. From September 28th to November 14th fifty men have died. Most of them from hunger. It is the biggest sorrow in the world. We decided to send messengers to the neighbouring island to get boats to Scotland. However, because the weather was so bad, this was not possible until October 27th, which was a pleasant day. They have not returned yet because the seas have been so rough. [The diary ends here.]

The large Canadian sailing ship Black Watch was wrecked on Fair Isle in 1877.

In 1862 around 40% of the population migrated to New Brunswick.

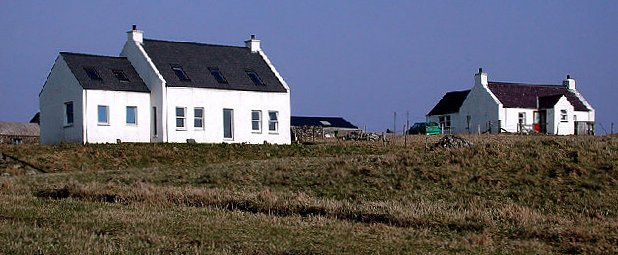
Croft houses

The Annual Reports of the Fishery Board for Scotland provide an insight into fishing in Fair Isle in the years before the First World War.

Fishery Statistics

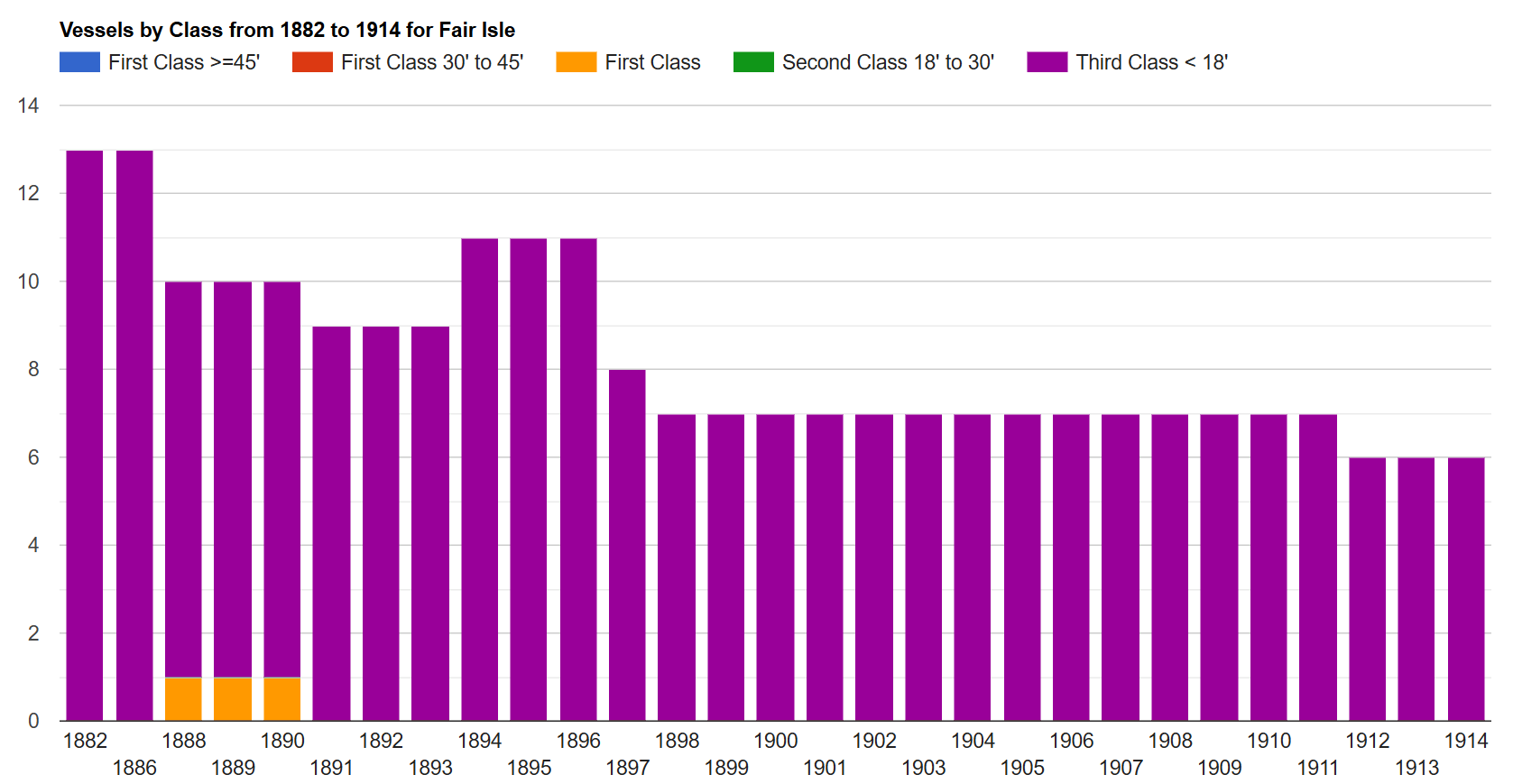
Vessels by class

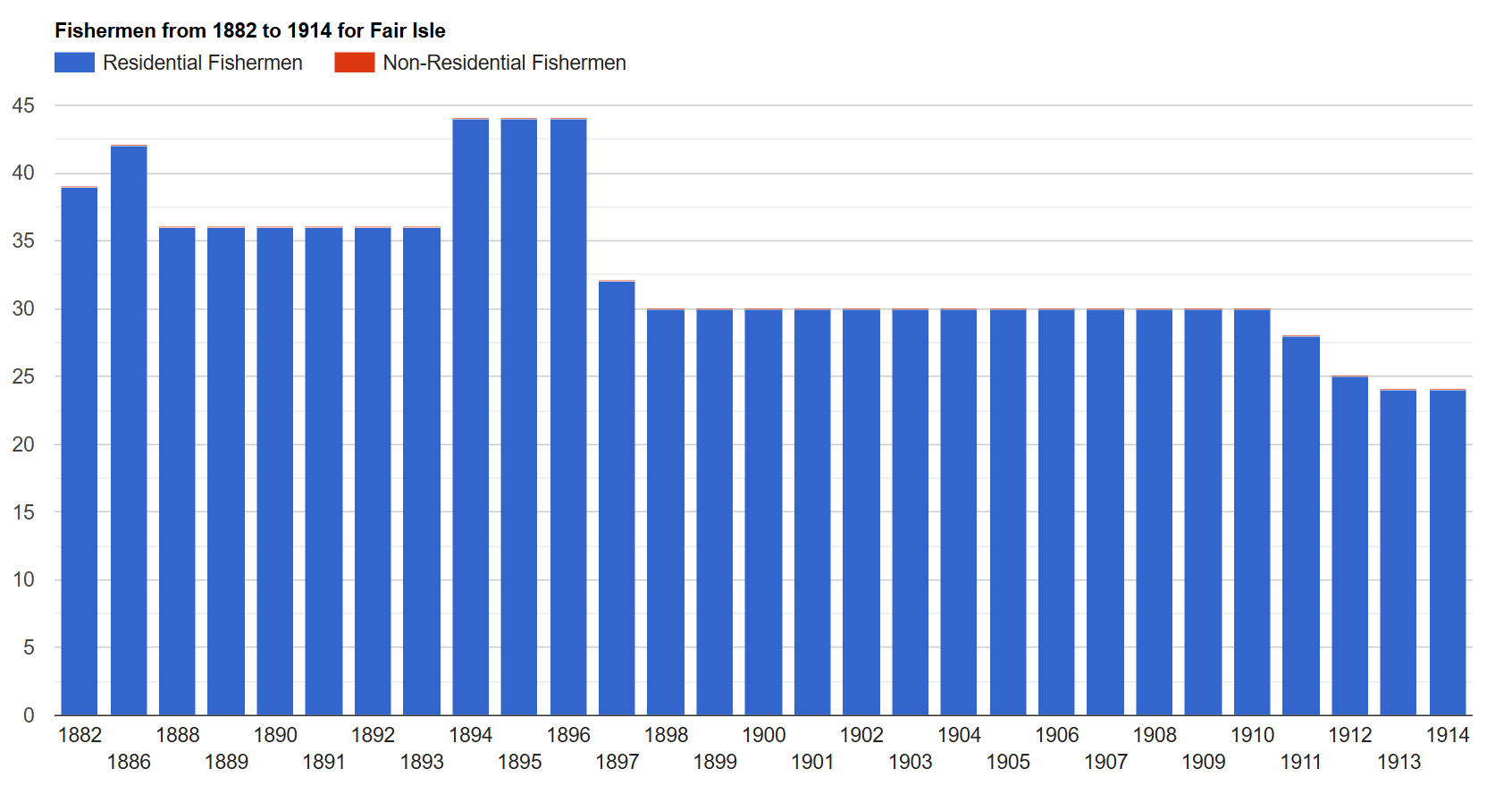
Fishermen

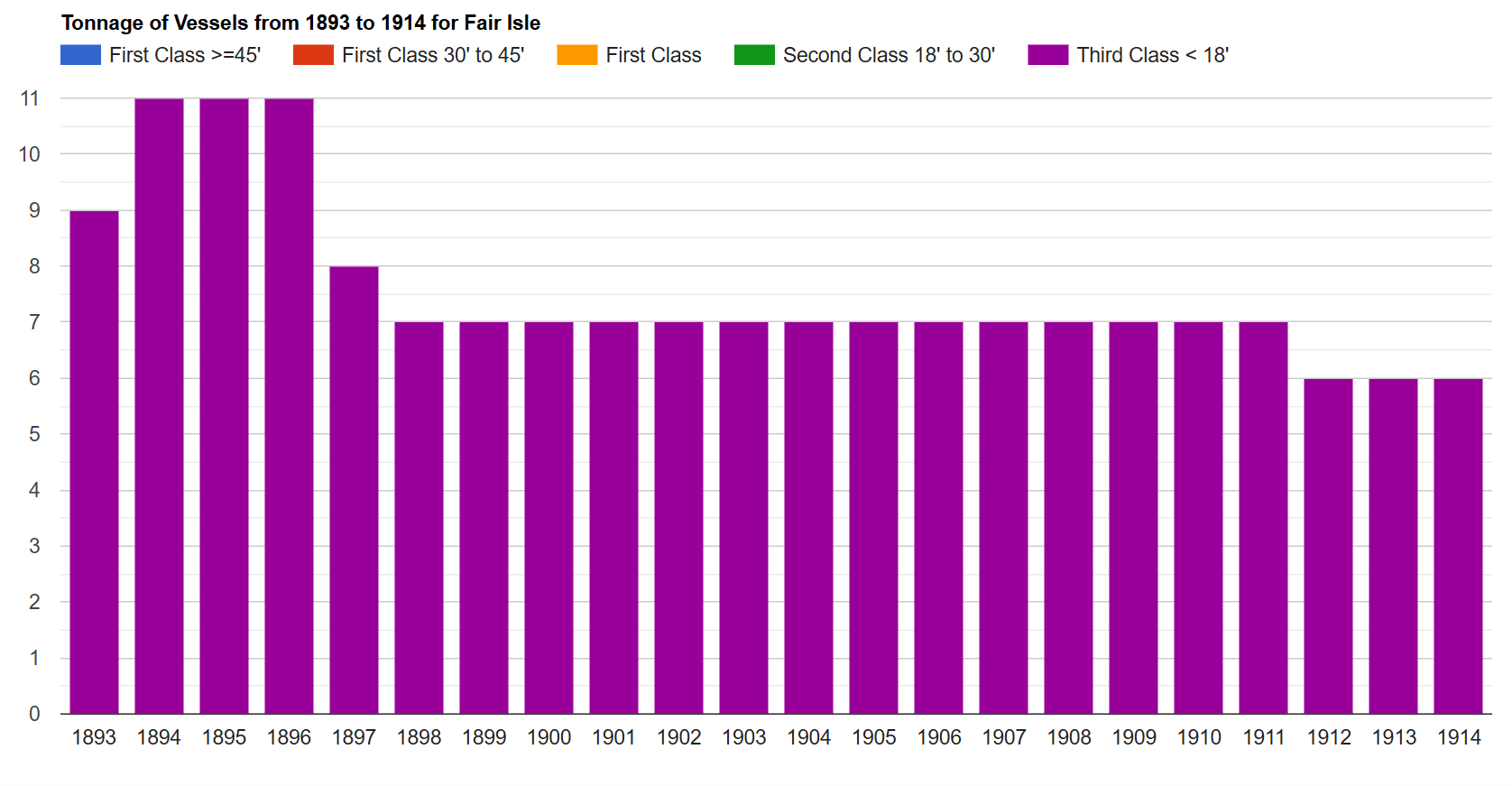
Tonnage of vessels

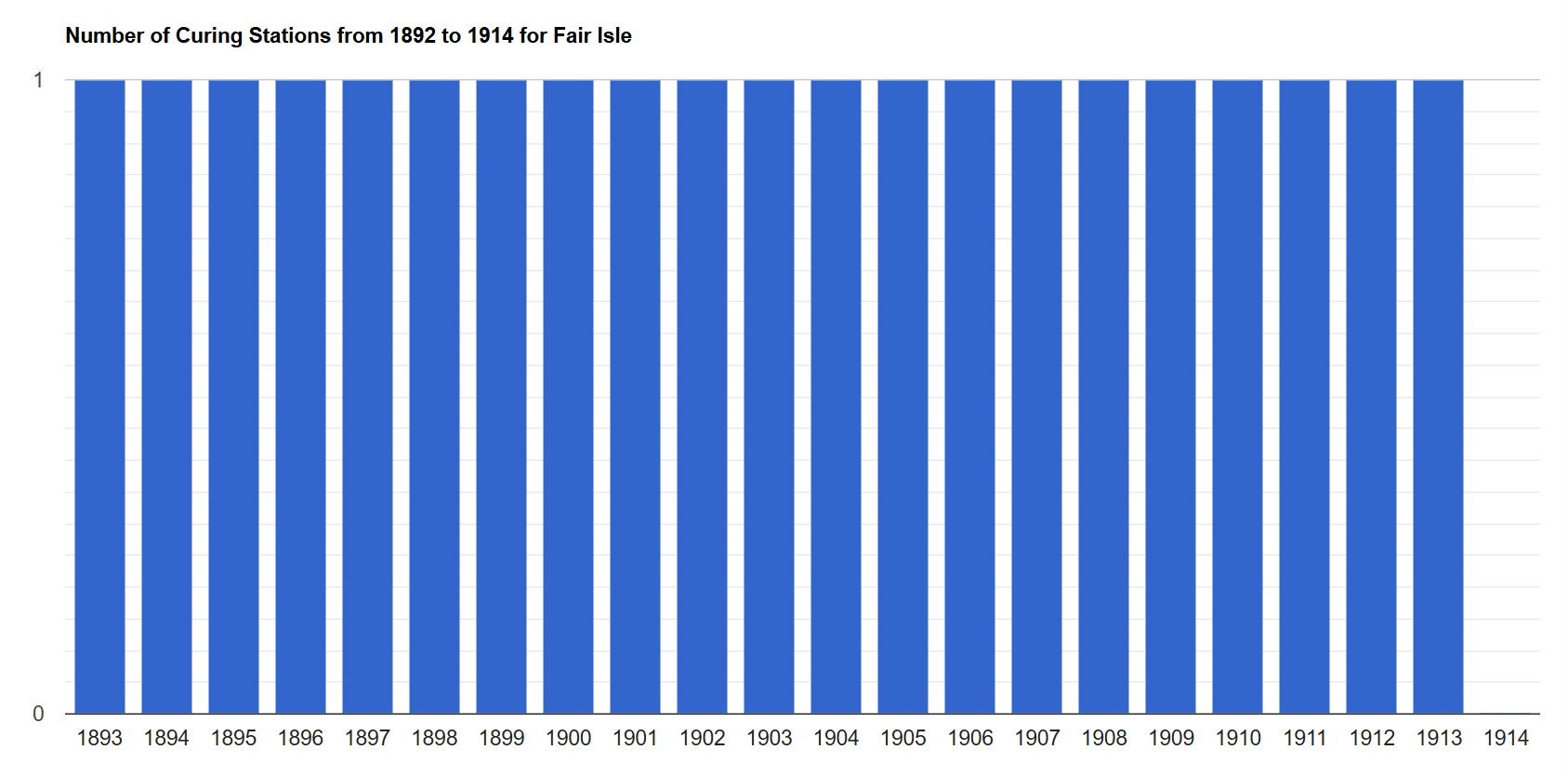
Number of curing stations

=== Military role ===
During the Second World War, the Royal Navy built two radar stations on top of Ward Hill (712 ft or 217 m), which operated from February and March 1940 and played an important role in detecting German bombers approaching Scapa Flow on 8 and 10 April 1940. The ruined buildings and Nissen huts are still present. A cable-operated narrow-gauge railway lies disused; it was once used to send supplies up to the summit of Ward Hill.

On 17 January 1941, a German Heinkel He 111 bomber, modified as a meteorological aircraft, crashed on the island; wreckage remains on the crash-site. The aircraft had been flying on a routine weather reconnaissance flight from its base at Oldenburg in Germany. It was intercepted by RAF Hawker Hurricane fighters from 3 Squadron, based at RAF Sumburgh; both of the aircraft's engines were damaged and several of the five crew were wounded. The pilot managed to make a crash-landing on Fair Isle to avoid ditching his crippled aircraft in the sea. Two crew died and three survived. The dead crew were buried in the island's churchyard; the survivors were detained by the islanders and remained for several days until weather conditions allowed them to be taken off the island by means of the Lerwick Lifeboat. Before the Lerwick boat reached the island, two separate boats from Orkney ran aground while making their way to collect the prisoners of war.

The South Light was a target. During raids, the wife of an assistant keeper was killed in 1941 and their daughter was injured; in 1942, the wife of another keeper and their daughter also died in a raid.

On 22 July 1941, Spitfire X5401 piloted by Flying Officer M. D. S. Hood crash-landed on Fair Isle returning from a reconnaissance mission over Ålesund, Norway. The pilot recalled the crash site to be adjacent to the track which crossed the airstrip. The cause of the crash proved to be a leak of coolant, which resulted in the engine overheating. The aircraft was recovered and flew again, and the pilot survived the war.

=== Modern times ===
The population was 223 individuals living in 34 houses at the end of the 19th century. Fair Isle was bought by the National Trust for Scotland in 1954 from George Waterston, the founder of the bird observatory. In that decade, electricity was not yet available to residents and only some homes had running water; the population was declining at a rate that created concern. The population was 69 in 2001 and had declined further to 44 permanent residents by the time of the 2022 census. The island became the first place in the UK all of whose adult inhabitants had been vaccinated against COVID-19.

Fair Isle has 14 scheduled monuments, ranging from the earliest signs of human activity to the remains of a Second World War radar station. The two automated lighthouses are protected as listed buildings. The island houses a series of high-technology relay stations carrying vital TV, radio, telephone and military communication links between Shetland, Orkney and the Scottish mainland. In this respect it continues its historic role as a signal station, linking the mainland and the more remote island groups. In 1976, when television relay equipment was updated to permit colour broadcasts to Shetland, the new equipment was housed in former Second World War radar station buildings on Fair Isle. Many television signals are relayed from Orkney to Shetland (rather than from the Scottish mainland) via Orkney's Keelylang Hill transmitter station.

== Geography ==
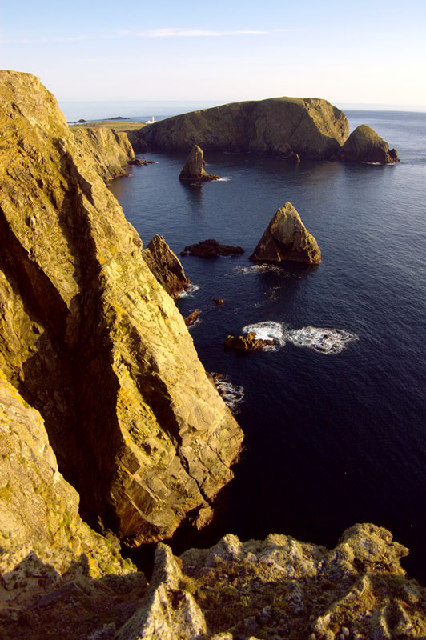
West cliffs, looking southwest towards Malcolm's Head

Fair Isle is administratively part of the parish of Dunrossness, Shetland, and is roughly equidistant from Sumburgh Head, some 38 km (24 mi) to the northeast on the Mainland of Shetland and North Ronaldsay, Orkney, some 43 km (27 mi) to the southwest. Fair Isle is 4.8 km (3 mi) long and 2.4 km (1.5 mi) wide. It has an area of 8 km^{2} (3 mi^{2}), making it the tenth-largest of the Shetland Islands. It gives its name to one of the British Sea Areas.

Most of the islanders live in the crofts on the southern half of the island, the northern half consisting of rocky moorland. The western coast consists of cliffs of up to 200 m (660 ft) in height, Ward Hill at 217 m (712 ft) being the highest point of the island and its only Marilyn. On the eastern coast the almost detached headland of Sheep Rock rises to 132 m (433 ft).

=== Climate ===
Fair Isle experiences an oceanic climate (Köppen Cfb), bordering on a subpolar oceanic climate (Cfc), with cool summers and mild winters. This is especially pronounced because of its location far from any sizeable landmass; Fair Isle has the smallest overall temperature range (least continental) of any weather station in the British Isles: a maximum of 22.6 °C (72.7 °F) and a minimum of −5.6 °C (21.9 °F) since 1951. This 60+ year temperature span is actually smaller than many places in inland southern England will record within a given three-month period. To further illustrate how extreme the maritime moderation at Fair Isle is, a rural location near the coastline in Northern Stockholm County on a similar latitude in Sweden broke Fair Isle's then all-time records in both directions within a 48-hour period between 26 and 28 April 2014.

On 19 July 2022, a maximum temperature of 22.6 °C (72.7 °F) was registered in Fair Isle.

The lowest temperature recorded in recent years was −4.6 °C (23.7 °F) in February 2010. Rainfall, at under 1,000 mm (39 in), is lower than one might expect for a location that is often in the main path of Atlantic depressions. This is explained by a lack of heavy convective rainfall during spring and summer months due to the absence of warm surface conditions.

Fair Isle's ocean moderation is so strong that areas on the same latitudes in the Scandinavian inland less than 1,000 km (620 mi) to the east have average summer highs 2–3 °C (4–5 °F) higher than Fair Isle's all-time record temperature, for example the Norwegian capital of Oslo and the Swedish capital of Stockholm. The −5 °C (23 °F) all-time low is uniquely mild for European locations on the 59th parallel north. The winter daily means are comparable to many areas as far south in the British Isles as south-central England, because of the extreme maritime moderation. It is in hardiness zone 9b or 10a (compared to 8b for the Faroes, 7b or 8a for Stockholm, and 1b for parts of Canada, all on or near the 60th parallel north. Central Florida (at 27–28 degrees north) has this hardiness zone.

Climate data for Fair Isle WMO ID: 03008; coordinates 59°31′36″N 1°37′54″W; elevation: 57 m (187 ft); 1991–2020 normals, extremes 1951–present
Month	Jan	Feb	Mar	Apr	May	Jun	Jul	Aug	Sep	Oct	Nov	Dec	Year
Record high °C (°F)	11.1 (52.0)	10.5 (50.9)	13.9 (57.0)	12.2 (54.0)	17.7 (63.9)	18.0 (64.4)	22.6 (72.7)	20.2 (68.4)	18.0 (64.4)	15.5 (59.9)	13.1 (55.6)	13.1 (55.6)	22.6 (72.7)
Mean daily maximum °C (°F)	6.9 (44.4)	6.4 (43.5)	7.0 (44.6)	8.2 (46.8)	10.1 (50.2)	12.1 (53.8)	13.9 (57.0)	14.3 (57.7)	13.0 (55.4)	10.9 (51.6)	8.9 (48.0)	7.4 (45.3)	10.0 (50.0)
Daily mean °C (°F)	5.2 (41.4)	4.7 (40.5)	5.2 (41.4)	6.4 (43.5)	8.1 (46.6)	10.3 (50.5)	12.1 (53.8)	12.6 (54.7)	11.4 (52.5)	9.3 (48.7)	7.3 (45.1)	5.4 (41.7)	8.2 (46.8)
Mean daily minimum °C (°F)	3.5 (38.3)	3.0 (37.4)	3.4 (38.1)	4.6 (40.3)	6.1 (43.0)	8.4 (47.1)	10.3 (50.5)	10.8 (51.4)	9.8 (49.6)	7.7 (45.9)	5.6 (42.1)	3.4 (38.1)	6.4 (43.5)
Record low °C (°F)	−4.5 (23.9)	−5.6 (21.9)	−5.0 (23.0)	−4.1 (24.6)	−1.6 (29.1)	1.5 (34.7)	4.2 (39.6)	4.4 (39.9)	1.4 (34.5)	−0.9 (30.4)	−3.4 (25.9)	−4.5 (23.9)	−5.6 (21.9)
Average precipitation mm (inches)	105.3 (4.15)	84.2 (3.31)	75.3 (2.96)	47.0 (1.85)	43.6 (1.72)	48.4 (1.91)	56.3 (2.22)	73.9 (2.91)	77.0 (3.03)	106.8 (4.20)	108.3 (4.26)	102.5 (4.04)	928.5 (36.56)
Average precipitation days (≥ 1.0 mm)	19.6	16.4	15.8	12.0	9.9	9.1	10.4	12.1	14.2	18.2	19.6	19.8	177.0
Mean monthly sunshine hours	29.2	60.2	105.7	155.6	214.8	166.1	147.2	154.6	110.7	79.2	39.8	21.5	1,284.5
Source 1: Met Office
Source 2: Tutiempo

== Economy ==
Over the centuries the island has changed hands many times. Trading links with Northern Europe are reflected in Fair Isle Haa, a traditional Hanseatic trading booth located not far from the South Harbour, traditionally used by residents of the southern part of the island. Rent was usually paid to absentee landlords (who rarely visited) in butter, cloth and fish oil.

Fishing has always been an important industry for the island. In 1702, the Dutch, who were interested in Shetland's herring fisheries, fought a naval battle against French warships just off the island.

Fair Isle is noted for its woollen jumpers, with knitting forming an important source of income for the women of the islands. The principal activity for the male islanders is crofting.

In January 2004, Fair Isle was granted Fairtrade Island status.

== Bird life ==
Many rare species of bird have been found on the island, with at least 27 species found on the island that were the first British records, and is probably the best place in Western Europe to see skulking Siberian passerines such as Pechora pipit, lanceolated warbler and Pallas's grasshopper warbler. For example, in 2015, rare birds discovered on the island included pallid harrier, arctic warbler, Moltoni's warbler, booted warbler, paddyfield warbler, Siberian thrush, and thrush nightingale. It is also home to an endemic subspecies of Eurasian wren, the Fair Isle wren Troglodytes troglodytes fridariensis. Fair Isle has been designated an Important Bird Area (IBA) by BirdLife International because it supports large colonies of seabirds and waterbirds, as well as being a stop-over site for migrating land birds.

=== Bird observatory ===
In 1948, George Waterston founded a permanent bird observatory on the island. Because of its importance as a bird migration watchpoint, it provided most of the accommodation on the island. The first director of the observatory was Kenneth Williamson. It was unusual among bird observatories in providing catered, rather than hostel-style, accommodation.

In 2010, a new observatory was built: a wooden lodge of two storeys, which cost £4 million and accommodated around 30 guests. The 2010 observatory building was destroyed by fire on 10 March 2019; the observatory's records had been digitised and were not affected. The cost of rebuilding was estimated at £7.4m.

== Infrastructure ==
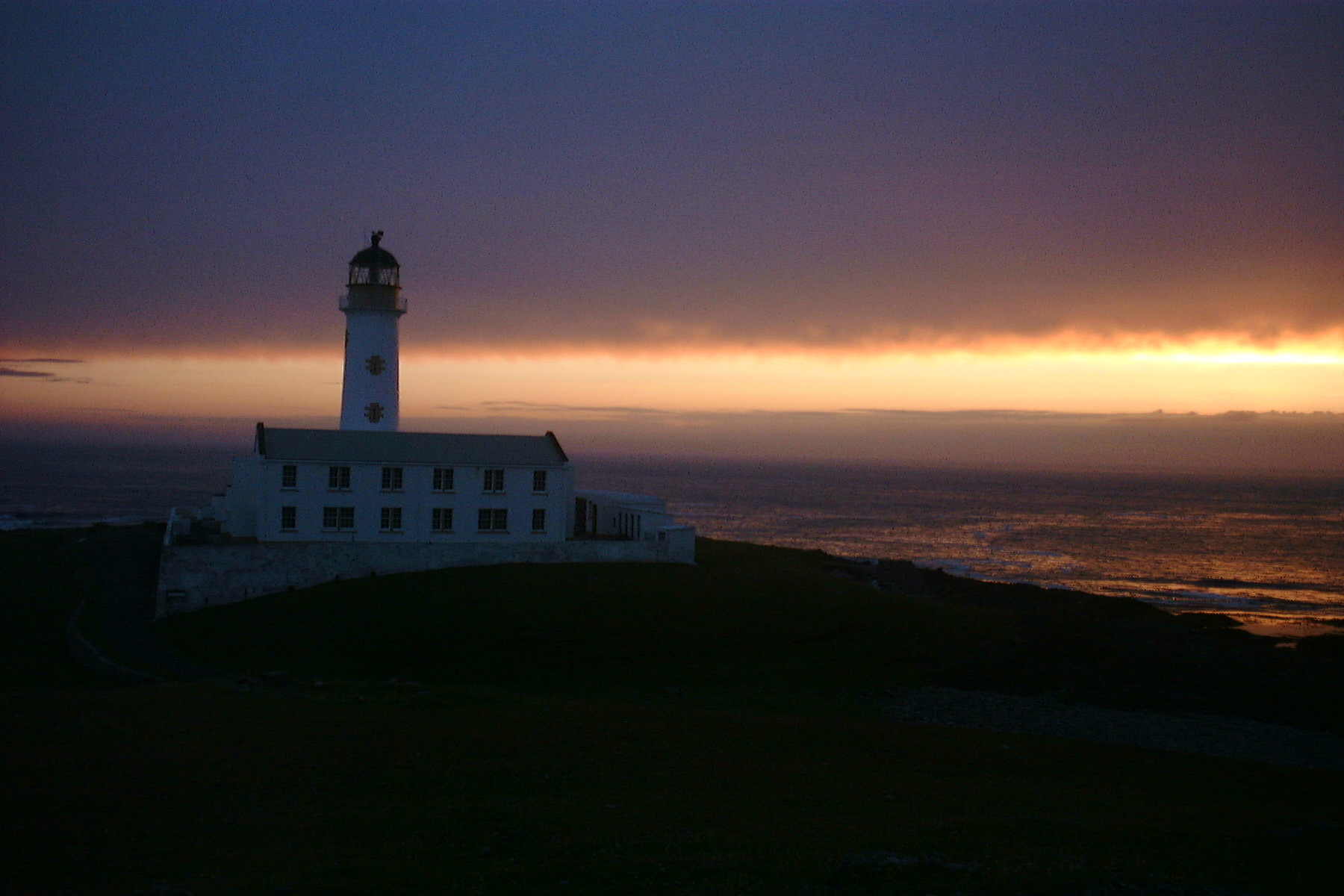
Sunset over the South Lighthouse

Other than the restaurant of the bird observatory, and its small evening-only bar, there are no pubs or restaurants on the island. There is one shop, one school and a community hall used for meetings and social events. There is no police station on the island; the main station is Lerwick and a section station is located in the village of Brae.

Passenger service to the island is provided by SIC Ferries on the vessel Good Shepherd IV or by a nine-seat passenger aeroplane from Tingwall Airport near Lerwick, operated by regional carrier Directflight.

=== Electricity supply ===
Fair Isle is not connected to the National Grid; electricity is provided by the Fair Isle Electricity Company. From the 1980s, power was generated by two diesel generators and two wind turbines. Diesel generators were automatically switched off if wind turbines provided sufficient power. Excess capacity was distributed through a separate network for home heating, with remote frequency-sensitive programmable relays controlling water heaters and storage heaters in the buildings of the community. Following the installation of three wind turbines, combined with solar panels and batteries, in a £3.5 million scheme completed in October 2018, the island has had a 24-hour electricity supply.

=== Communication ===
Fair Isle is home to two GSM 900 MHz base stations operated by Vodafone and O2. On 16 April 2019, an EE 4G antenna was turned on by Openreach. In 2023, the island became connected by a fibre submarine cable, as a spur off a cable linking Shetland and Orkney. This supplements and upgrades the long-distance microwave link opened in 1979. Full fibre services then became available to all properties on the island.

=== Emergency services ===
Fair Isle has a fire station equipped with a single fire appliance, and staffed by a retained fire crew of local volunteers. It was originally part of the Highlands and Islands Fire and Rescue Service, which was absorbed into the national Scottish Fire and Rescue Service on 1 April 2013. A locally organised volunteer fire brigade was formed in 1996 by island residents. This was later absorbed into the statutory fire service, with professional training provided, and the local service designated a retained fire crew. The first purpose-built fire engine was stationed to the island in 2002.

In October 2011, a contract for the construction of a £140,000 purpose-built fire station was awarded to Shetland company Ness Engineering, who completed the construction and equipping of the fire station, including its connection to the island power and water supplies, and the installation of a rainwater harvesting system within the building. The new fire station was officially opened on 14 March 2013.

There is a small Coastguard cliff-rescue team on the island. Like the fire service, the Coastguard is a retained (volunteer) emergency service. The Fair Isle Coastguard cliff rescue team were the first British Coastguard unit to be equipped with a quad ATV. The quad is painted in HM Coastguard livery, with reflective Battenburg markings and has an optional equipment trailer.

There are no emergency medical services on Fair Isle. Routine medical care is provided by a community nurse. In the event of accident and emergency the community nurse provides first aid until casualties can be removed to Shetland Mainland, usually by helicopter air ambulance. In severe weather conditions or life-threatening emergencies, the Coastguard helicopter can undertake the patient evacuation.

== Transport ==
=== Air ===
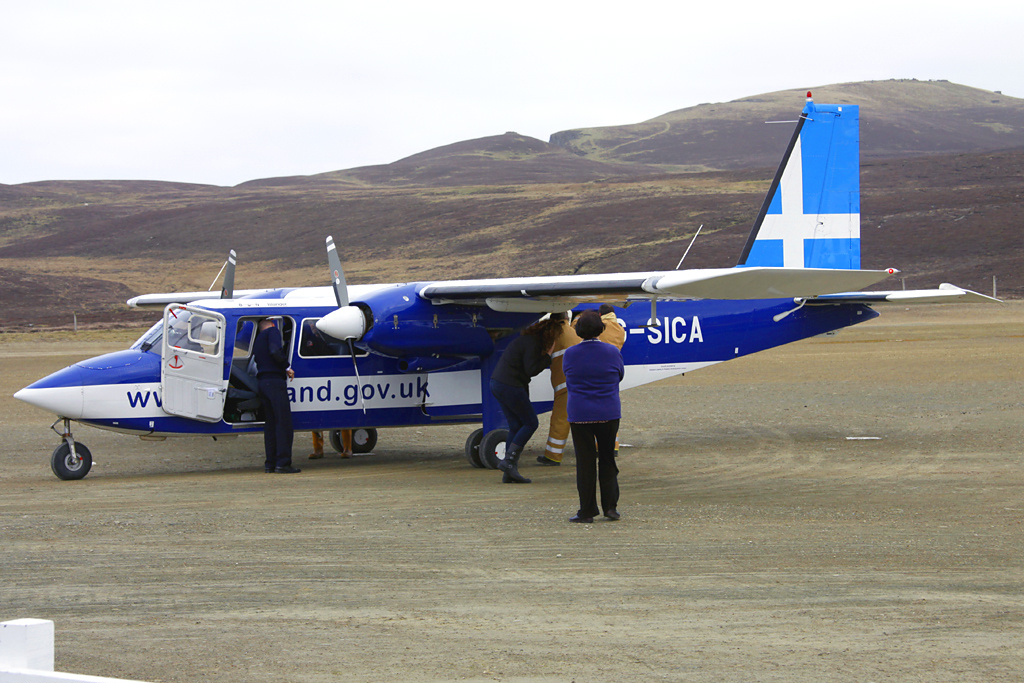
A Britten-Norman Islander of Directflight at Fair Isle Airport preparing for a flight to Tingwall Airport in April 2011

Fair Isle Airport serves the island with flights to Tingwall Airport near Lerwick on Shetland Mainland. Flights to Kirkwall on Orkney were scheduled to begin in September 2017, provided by Loganair. Private aircraft use the facility and scheduled flights arrive twice daily, three days a week. There is a small terminal building providing limited services. Fire cover is provided by the island fire service.

There are two helipads on the island; one at the South Fair Isle lighthouse and used by Northern Lighthouse Board and HM Coastguard helicopters, and the other at the North Fair Isle lighthouse.

=== Sea ===
There are two main harbours, north harbour and south harbour; both formed naturally, being sheltered by the headland of Bu Ness. They are separated by a narrow isthmus of gravel. The north harbour is the main route for goods, provisions, and Royal Mail postal services arriving at and departing from the island. The ferry Good Shepherd IV plies between Fair Isle north harbour and Grutness on Shetland Mainland. In summer only, the ferry also runs from Lerwick once every two weeks.

=== Road ===
A road connects the populated areas of the island, along its full length.

== Education ==
Fair Isle has one primary school, with two classrooms. There is a full-time head teacher, and a part-time assistant teacher. The number of pupils varies over time, but has generally been between five and ten, with three pupils as of 2021. Islanders of secondary school age are generally educated off-island, on Shetland Mainland, where they board in halls of residence, returning to Fair Isle during holiday periods.

== Religion ==
Christianity is the only formally organised religion on Fair Isle. There are two churches, one Methodist, and one Church of Scotland (Presbyterian). The Methodist church has a resident non-stipendiary minister, who reports to a full-time minister on Shetland Mainland.

The Methodist church was constructed in 1886.

The Church of Scotland church was built in 1892. Fair Isle is part of Dunrossness parish.

== Conservation designations ==
Most of the island is designated by NatureScot as both a Site of Special Scientific Interest (SSSI) and a Special Area of Conservation (SCA). The island and its surrounding seas are also designated by NatureScot as a Special Protection Area (SPA) due to the important bird species present.

In 2016 the seas around Fair Isle were designated as a Marine Protected Area (MPA). As of 2019 it is the only MPA in Scotland to be designated specifically as a "Demonstration and Research" MPA. The aims of this MPA designation are defined as being:

To demonstrate and research the use of an ecosystem approach, which includes the following –
a) the environmental monitoring of seabirds and of other mobile marine species;
b) the environmental monitoring of the factors which influence the populations of seabirds and of other mobile species;
c) the development and implementation of a local sustainable shellfish fishery;
d) the development of a research programme into local fisheries which includes research on species composition, size, distribution and temporal and spatial changes in fish stocks;
e) based upon the research undertaken under sub-paragraph (d), the development of a sustainable-use management programme for local fisheries.

— Scottish Government

== Notable people ==
- Ewen Thomson (born 1971 in Fair Isle), a Scottish luthier, specialising in violins, violas and cellos
- Inge Thomson (born 1974 in Fair Isle), a singer and multi-instrumentalist
- Chris Stout (born 1976), a Scottish fiddle/violin player from Shetland; grew up in Fair Isle

== Gallery ==
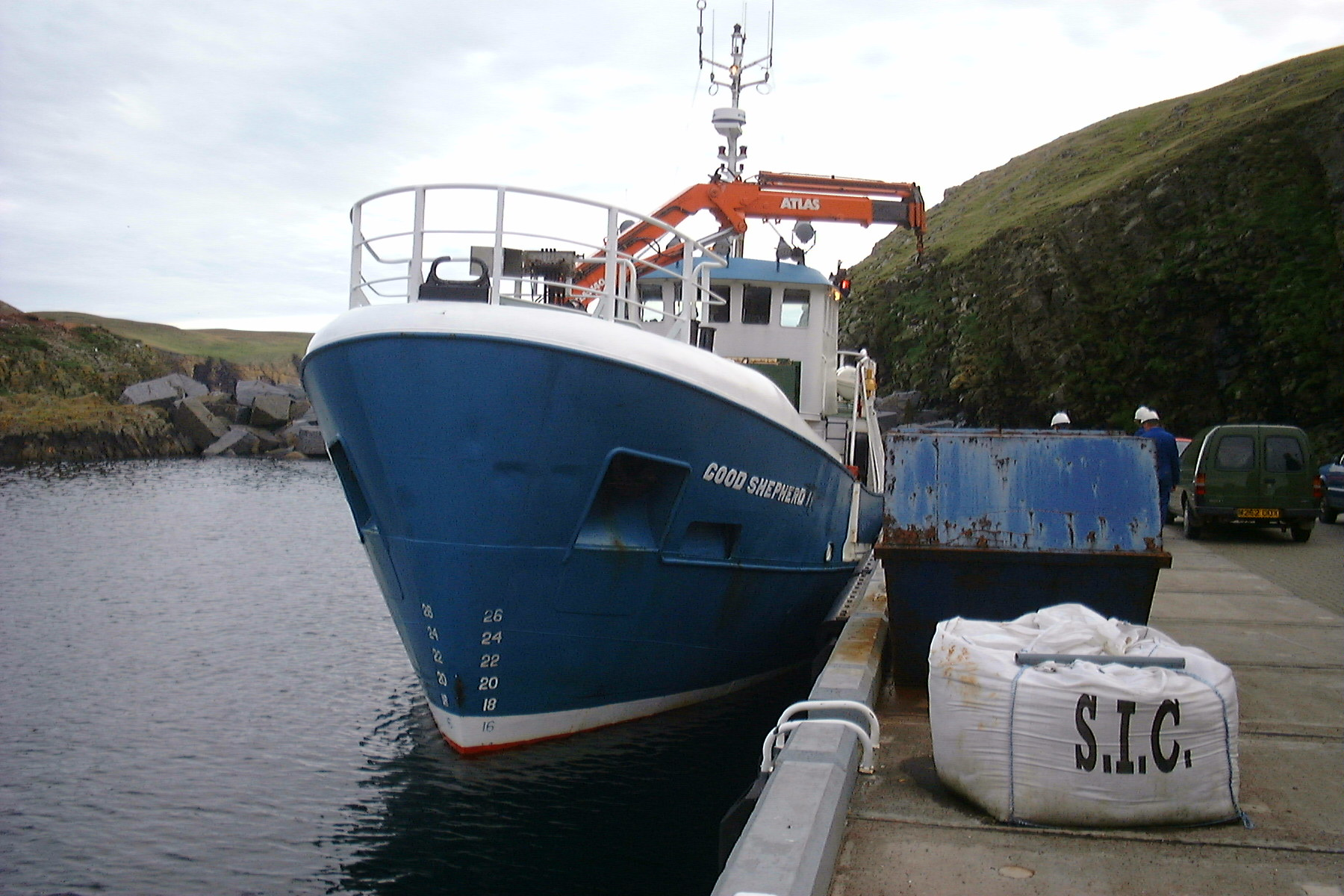
Good Shepherd IV at Fair Isle

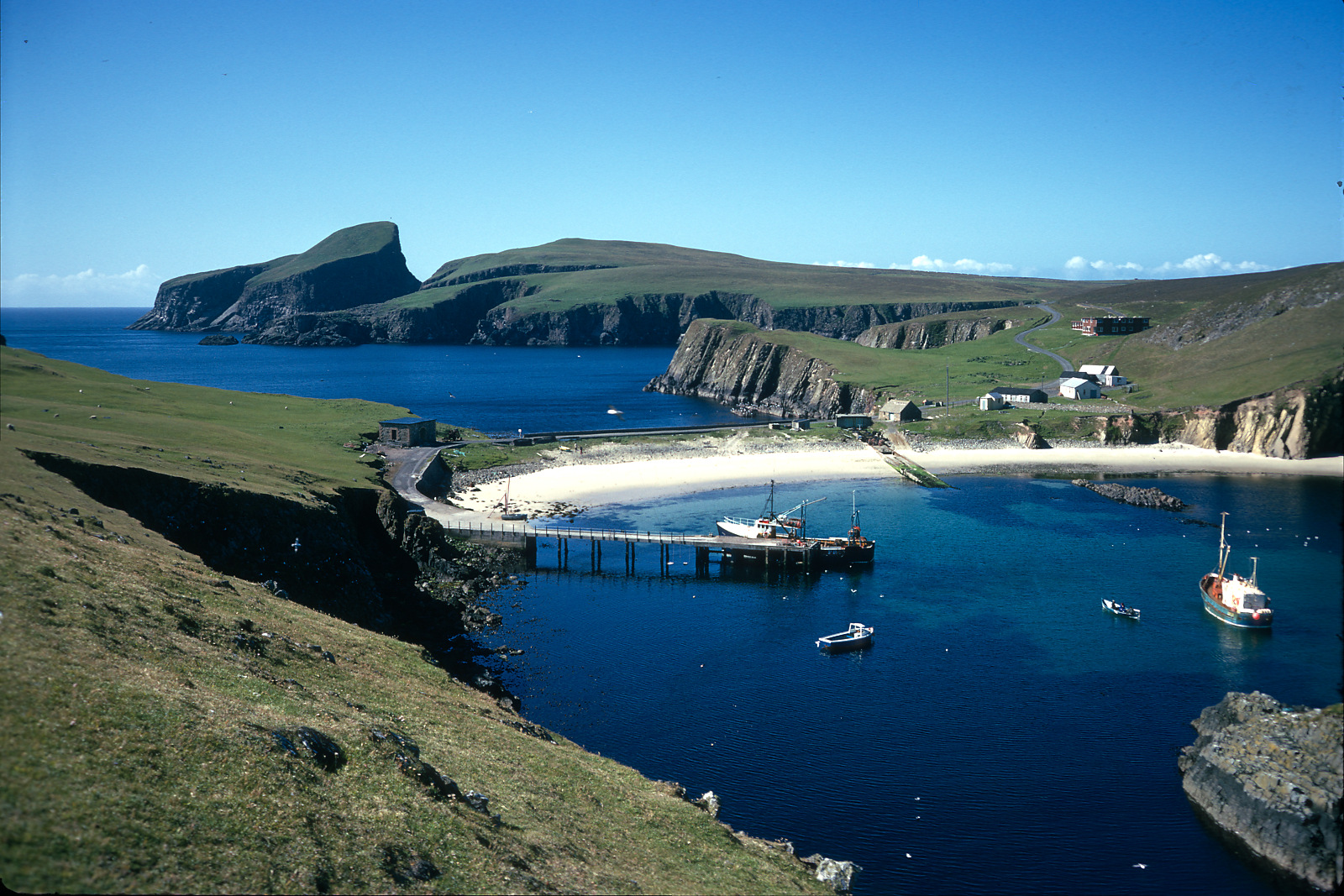
North Haven, 1974

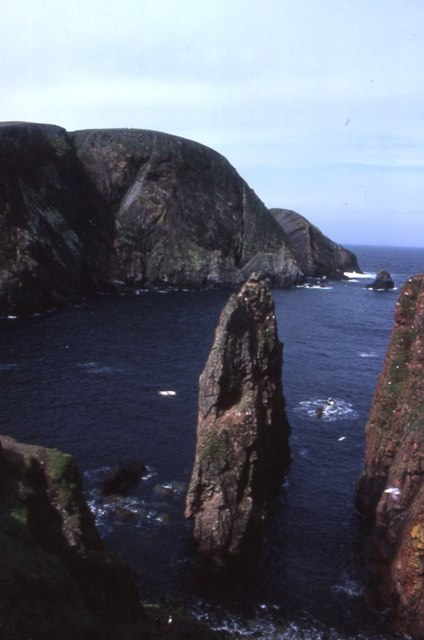
Da Sherriff

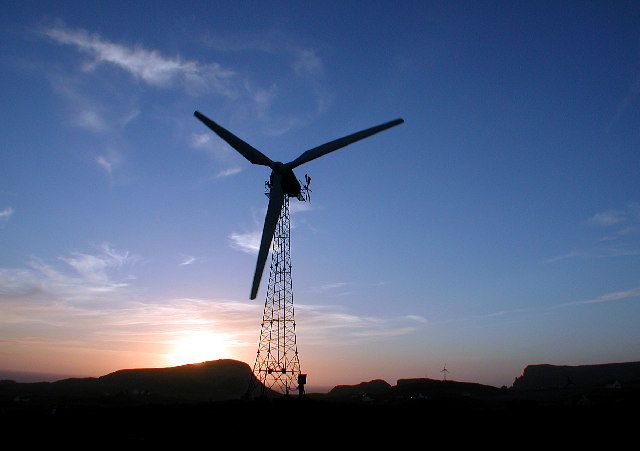
100 kW Aerogenerator

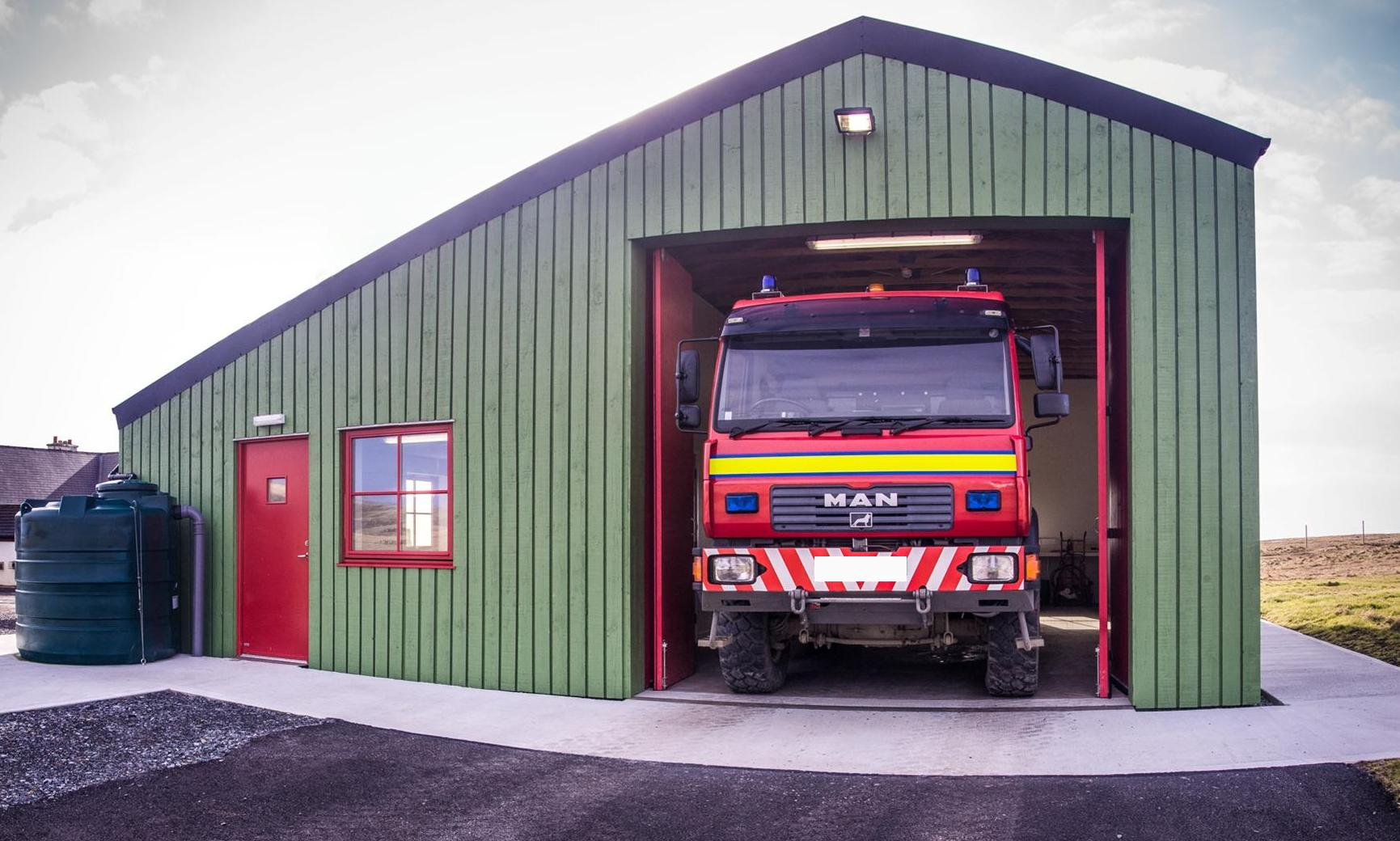
Fire station

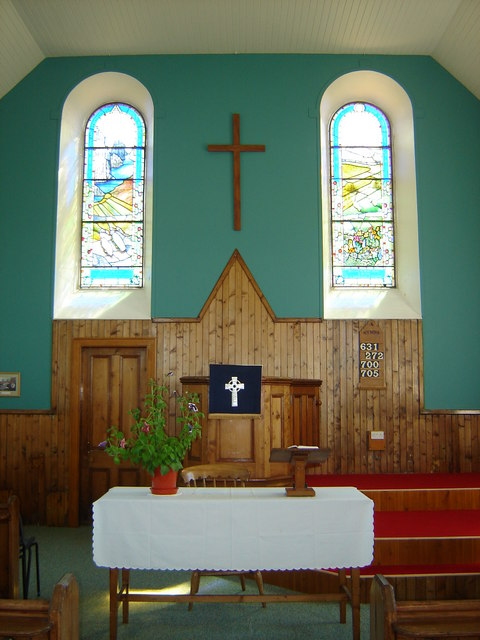
Kirk interior

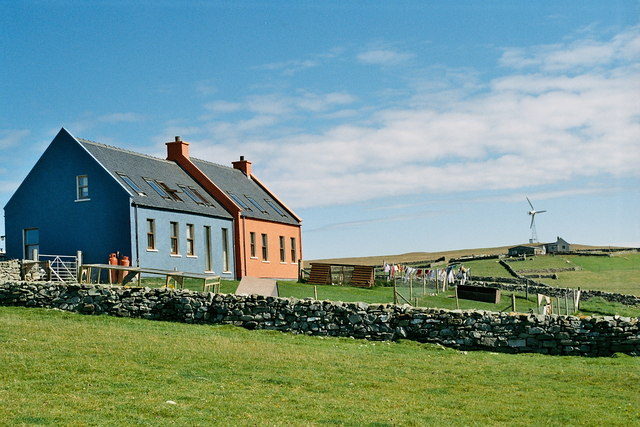
Burkle, Croft houses

== See also ==
- List of lighthouses in Scotland
- List of Northern Lighthouse Board lighthouses
- Foula
- List of Shetland islands
