= Foula Airfield =

Airport in the Shetland Isles, Scotland

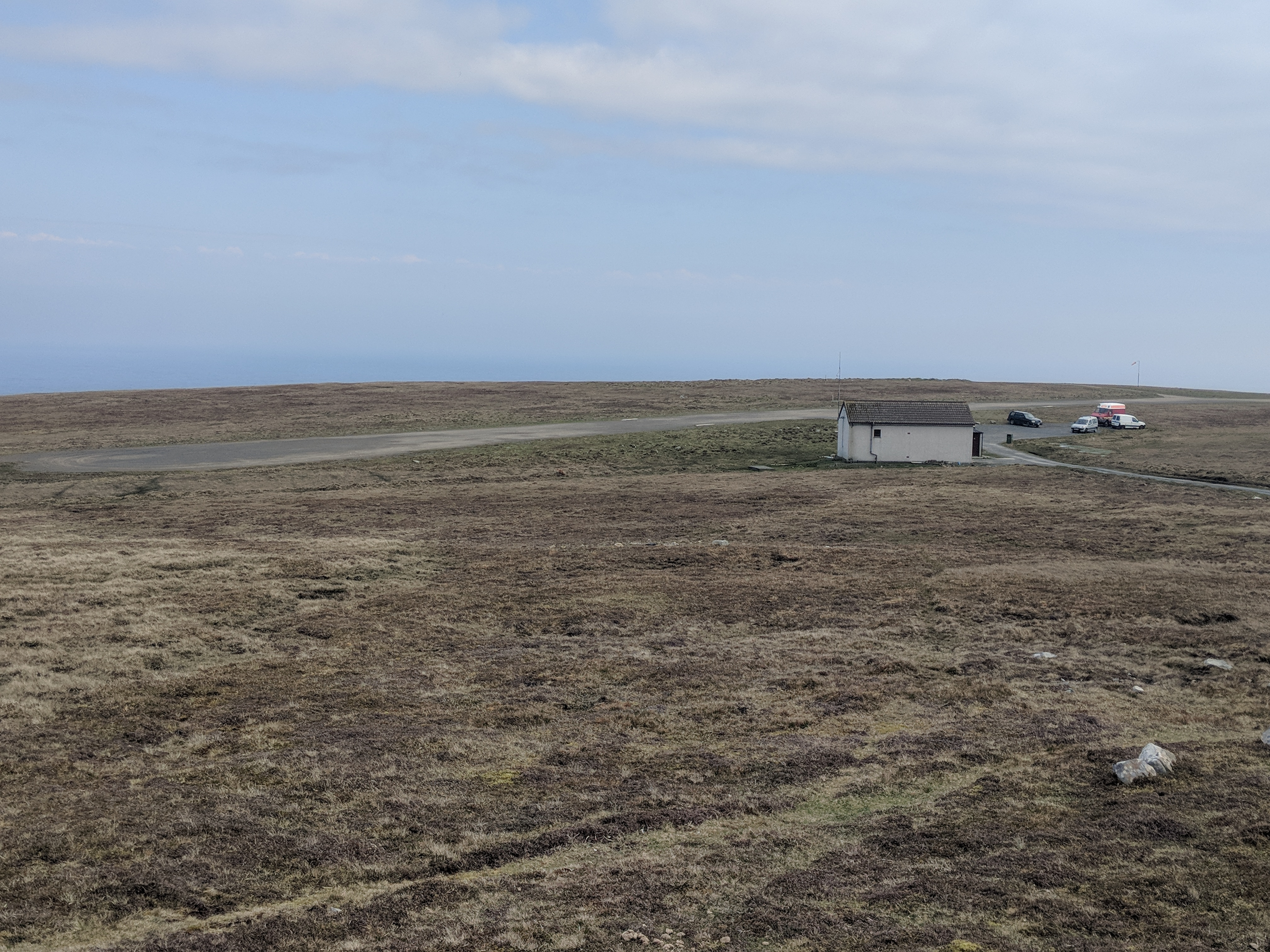
- IATA: FOA; ICAO: EGFO

Summary
- Owner: Foula Airstrip Trust
- Serves: Foula
- Location: Foula, Shetland, Scotland
- Elevation AMSL: 150 ft / 46 m
- Coordinates: 60°07′18″N 2°03′12″W
- Website: shetland.gov.uk

Map
- Location in Shetland

Runways
Direction	Length		Surface
Direction	ft	m	Surface
18/36	1,252	382

Foula Airfield (IATA: FOA) is an airfield located on the remote island of Foula, part of the Shetland Islands in the north of Scotland.

== History ==
The airstrip opened in the 1970s and is run by the Foula Airstrip Trust, Scottish charity number SC021728. Foula is also served by a ferry service running three times a week but many tourists prefer the short flight to the 135 min crossing. Also, the ferry is based on Foula, so a day trip to the island is possible only by air. The flights are used to transport essentials, such as medical prescriptions, to the island, which has a population of 38.

The airfield also provides the island's only public toilet and telephone.

== Airline and destination ==
Foula is served by a PSO service from Tingwall Airport run by Airtask Group and funded by Shetland Islands Council. The service uses a Britten Norman Islander aircraft and runs 7 times a week in winter and 13 times a week in summer, with a flying time of 15 minutes. Flights are heavily weather dependent due to fog and crosswind.

Airlines	Destinations
Directflight	Lerwick

== Accidents and incidents ==
In June 2014 flights were suspended as it was believed that the airfield's insurance was not suitable following the closure of the island's fire station in 2012. Flights have since resumed.
