= Fair Isle Channel =

Body of water separating the Orkney Islands from the Shetland Islands

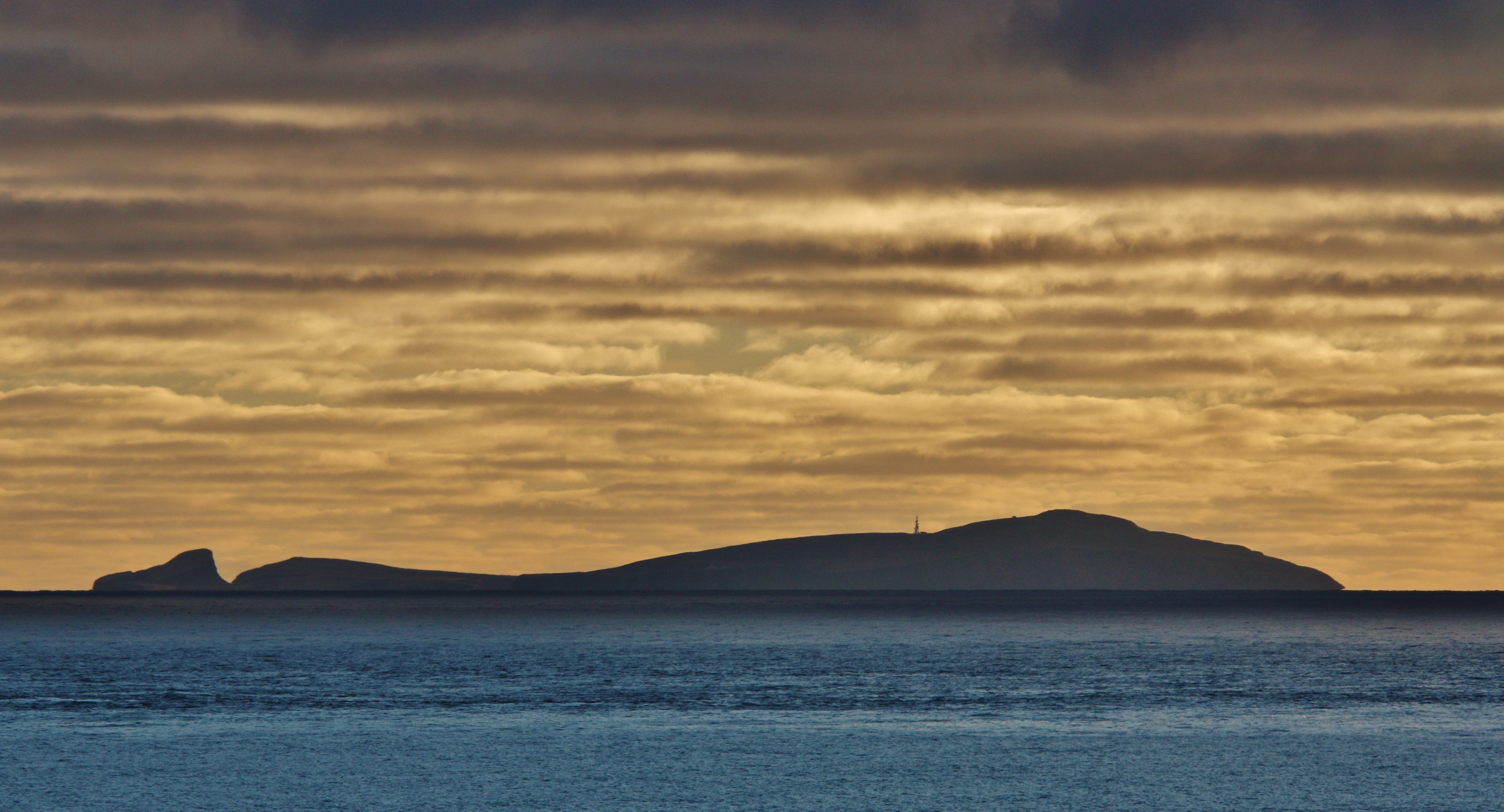
Fair Isle Channel

The Fair Isle Channel, also known as the Fair Isle Gap, is a body of water in northeast Scotland in the North Sea separating the Orkney Islands from the Shetland Islands. It is so named because of the presence of the Fair Isle, one of the Shetland Islands, which is located near its center.

The Fair Isle Channel is believed to be one of the bodies of water used by the Spanish Armada in 1588 during its attempt to return to Spain following the Battle of Gravelines. Several of the Armada's ships became stragglers once this channel was past, and ended up being lost on the shores of Ireland in the following weeks.
