= Directflight =

British airline

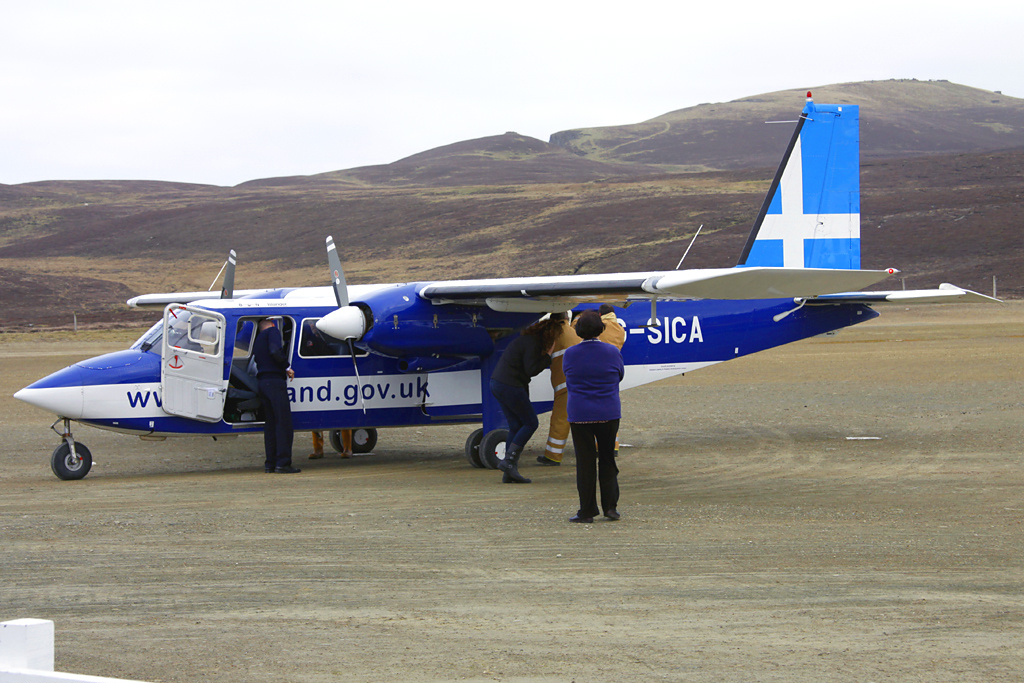
- Directflight Britten-Norman BN-2B-20 Islander at Fair Isle.
| IATA | ICAO | Call sign |
|---|---|---|
| None | DCT | AIRTASK |
- Hubs: Tingwall Airport
- Fleet size: 8
- Destinations: 3 (Shetland Islands)
- Parent company: Airtask Group Limited
- Headquarters: Cranfield, England, UK

Directflight Limited, trading as Airtask Group, is a British airline based in Cranfield, Bedfordshire, England and operating flights mainly in the Shetland Islands. It is a subsidiary of Airtask Group Ltd. Directflight (Scotland) Limited was dissolved on 12 July 2013 and merged into Directflight Limited.

== Destinations ==
=== Scotland ===
Shetland Island Inter Island Air Services:

| Country | City | Airport | Notes |
|---|---|---|---|
| United Kingdom (Scotland) | Fair Isle | Fair Isle Airport | |
| United Kingdom (Scotland) | Foula | Foula Airfield | |
| United Kingdom (Scotland) | Tingwall | Tingwall Airport | Base |

== Fleet ==
As of July 2017 the Shetland Island Inter Island Air Services fleet consists of the following aircraft:

Shetland Island Inter Island Air Services
| Aircraft | In service | Passengers |
|---|---|---|
| Britten-Norman BN-2B-26 Islander | 2 | 9 |
| Total | 2 | |

As of July 2017 the Directflight fleet consists of the following aircraft:

Directflight
| Aircraft | In service | Notes |
|---|---|---|
| Diamond DA42 | 1 | 1 as Registered Owner |
| Reims-Cessna F406 Caravan II | 4 | 2 as Registered Owner and 2 as AOC Holder |
| British Aerospace 146 | 1 | 1 as AOC Holder |
| Total | 6 | |
