= El Gran Grifón =

Flagship of the Spanish Armada's supply squadron

Coordinates: 59°30′57″N 1°37′40″W

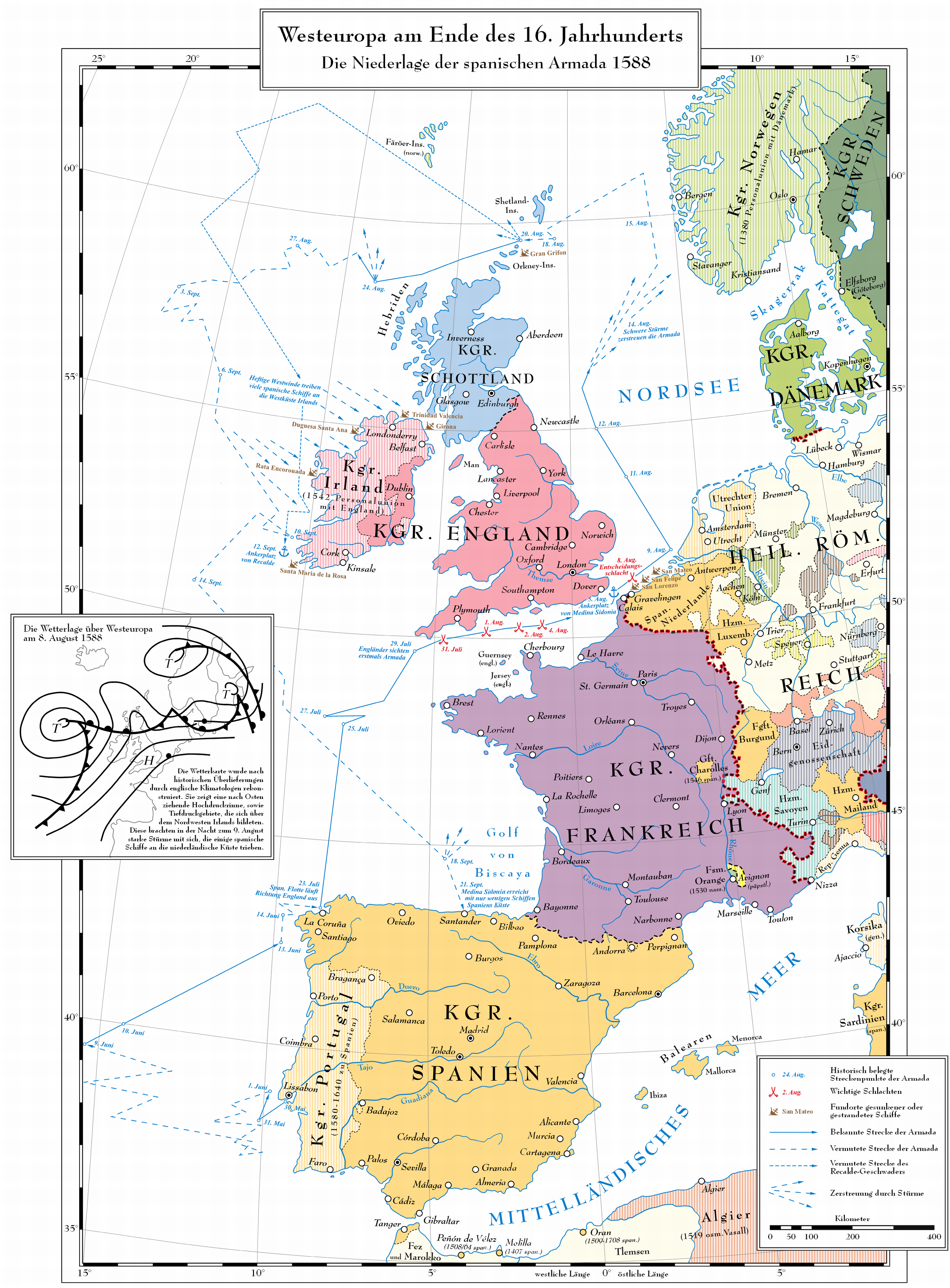
Scotland in 1588

El Gran Grifón was the flagship of the Spanish Armada's supply squadron of Baltic hulks (built in and chartered from the City of Rostock, in modern-day Germany); see list of ships of the Spanish Armada. She was shipwrecked on Fair Isle, Shetland, Scotland, on 27 September 1588.

The 650-ton 38-gun ship sailed under the command and section flag of Juan Gómez de Medina and not – as often quoted – under the command of Don Alonso Pérez de Guzmán el Bueno, 7th Duke of Medina Sidonia, Admiral of Spain and commanding officer of the Armada.

She had been attacked by the Revenge and badly damaged right in the first meeting in the Channel, but managed somehow to escape into the open North Sea where she later met the rest of the beaten Armada. Because of leaks she had to run before the wind up the east coast of Britain. However, an unusually strong storm and the tides forced the ships to cross between Norway and the Northern Isles for about a week before they reached the Atlantic. Having the coast of Ireland nearly in sight, many ships were thrown back north by another storm. El Gran Grifón, the Barca de Amburgo (a hulk, chartered from the City of Hamburg) and the Trinidad Valencera (1,100-tons, one of the biggest ships of the Armada) were separated from the remaining fleet. The Barca de Amburgo foundered south west of the Fair Isle, but was able to split her crew between El Gran Grifon and the Trinidad Valencera (later wrecked in Irish waters). Thus El Gran Grifón carried 43 crew and 234 soldiers – far more sailors and armed forces than standard.

When El Gran Grifón arrived at Fair Isle on 27 September 1588 trying to find a haven to effect repairs, she anchored in Swartz Geo, but the tide drove the ship ashore so that she was wrecked on the rocks of Stroms Hellier. The crew and soldiers scrambled ashore, and were stranded on the isle for about two months before Andrew Umphray, the owner of Fair Isle, heard about the shipwrecked sailors and took Gomez de Medina to Quendale on the Shetland mainland where he stayed with Malcolm Sinclair of Quendale. Most of the Spanish sailors departed first for Orkney (where they are still remembered as the "Westray Dons") to Anstruther in Fife, and then to Edinburgh. 50 of the men died on Fair Isle either from their wounds or starvation or exposure and were buried in the "Spaniards' Grave". Half of the survivors were killed when their ship en route to Spain was attacked and sent aground by Dutch gunboats alerted by the English Navy (Queen Elizabeth had only promised that they would not be molested by English ships).

Patrick Stewart, 2nd Earl of Orkney, made a contract with William Irving to salvage guns from the wreck in the 1590s. The wreck of El Gran Grifón was excavated by Colin Martin and Sydney Wignall in 1970. In 1984 a delegation from Spain planted an iron cross in the island's cemetery in remembrance of the sailors who had died there.

== Contemporary accounts ==
Two little-known diaries provide contemporary accounts of what happened to the men of the El Gran Grifón during the Spanish Armada. The first is a diary written by a crew member (unnamed), which was published in 1885 by C.F. Duro in his book La Armada Invencible (account number 171). It has been partly translated into English. The following extracts from the diary are taken from the translation by Mike Shepherd in his book North Sea Heroes, and appear here with his permission. The dates are old style.

August 6, 1588: With a favourable wind we arrived at Calais, a city of the King of France, at four in the afternoon. We set anchor [four miles offshore] and the opposing navy arrived, and anchored about a cannon shot further out from us.

August 7–8, 1588: At about twelve o'clock at night, a little more or less, the current and the wind coming against where we were at anchor, the English let loose eight ships, which they then set on fire, and these were aimed at the middle of our fleet. [The English] were so fortunate with their efforts, because they evicted us with eight ships, which they could not and did not dare to do with 130 ships.

August 12–14, 1588: We woke up within a cannon shot of the enemy navy, and at noon we saw how the enemy navy was getting close. It was all very sad, so that no one spoke to each other, not even the admiral responded when we came to greet him. On the 13th of that month, the admiral sent an order to throw all the horses and mules into the sea to save the drinking water on board. On the 14th of that month we saw many horses and mules swimming past us after they had been thrown out, which was a great pity, because they were all approaching the ships to get help.

From August 18 to September 2, we made a determined effort to see if we could double the Cape of Clare on the coast of Ireland [probably the Galway coastline]. It was God's will that he would not allow it. On September 2, we lost the other ships and we ran alone. We then spent the next three days in great danger from a horrendous storm.

We were given respite from the storm on the 5th, which encouraged us to go back to Spain. We slept until eleven o'clock, and then made another attempt to round the cape. We tacked back and forth until the 17th to see if we could get past it but the winds were not in our favour. [And then] A great storm damaged our ship, opening up gaps in the planks of our hull. Even with two pumps and all the men helping we could barely cope with the water flooding in.

September 24–26, 1588: The wind rose again and contrary to the direction which would take us home. We decided to turn around and make for Scotland. Late on the 25^{th,} we discovered some islands, which our pilot said were Scottish and inhabited by wild people.

We sailed to the north-east until the 26th when we discovered other islands. We would try to get away from them in case we were shipwrecked there. We were now resolved to find the nearest part of the mainland of Scotland, ramming the ship onland should we have to, because the sea was turning rough and the hull was filling with water again. We must finish this tonight, because the sea is so rough it is as if it fills the sky.

September 27, 1588: At two o'clock at night the rain stopped, revealing another island on our prow. Those who have experienced such a situation will understand the confusion we felt. God had helped us at this moment by giving us enough light to see so that we could flee from this peril. As it became lighter, in two hours, more or less, we came upon a very large island which looked impossible to get round. This was the island they call Creane [the Mainland of Orkney?], which was where we would land should we not make the Scottish mainland. We wanted to get close to her but we feared the sea and its fierceness. The sea was crashing into us with huge waves and our only thought was that our lives were now at an end. We beseeched God to show us the true path before our ship fell apart. If we are to stay in the ship any longer we will die. The men are in despair, 230 soldiers from our ship and forty more who were rescued, didn't lift a finger, and each one so disheartened they are calling to the Virgin Mary, bewailing their lot that they had come on such a bitter journey. [Only God could help them now, a deity 'who never lacked anyone to call him,' writes the diarist. And then, at two o'clock in the afternoon, they spotted Fair Isle.]

September 27 – November 14, 1588 [on Fair Isle]: We settled in a shelter we found on the day we ran into this great danger, which was 27 September 1588. We found it populated by up to seventeen neighbours [families?] in small houses that were more like huts than anything else; a savage people. They eat mostly fish and they do not have bread, or very little, and cakes baked from barley. They cook these over fires fed with fuel taken from the earth, which they call turba [peat]. They have cattle, quite a lot for them because they seldom eat meat. They herd cows, sheep, and pigs; the cows sustain them and they make money from the milk and butter. They get wool from the sheep for their clothes. They are very dirty people. They are not Christian but not quite heretics either. Their minister comes from an island to preach to them once a year. They do not like this but cannot do anything about it. It is a shame.

Three hundred men landed on this island without any food. From September 28th to November 14th fifty men have died. Most of them from hunger. It is the biggest sorrow in the world. We decided to send messengers to the neighbouring island to get boats to Scotland. However, because the weather was so bad, this was not possible until October 27th, which was a pleasant day. They have not returned yet because the seas have been so rough. [The diary ends here.]

The second source is an extract from the diary written by James Melville, the minister of Anstruther-Wester Parish Church In Fife. He records the unexpected landing of 260 men from the El Gran Grifón at Anstruther harbour, having arrived from Orkney. What follows is a story of great kindness and much poignancy. It is written in Scots.

For within twa or thrie monethe thairefter, earlie in the morning, be brak of day, ane of our bailyies cam to my bedsyde, saying, (but nocht with fray,) "I haiff to tell yow newes, Sir. Ther is arryvit within our herbrie [harbour] this morning a schipe full of Spainyarts, bot nocht to giff mercie bot to ask!"

And sa schawes me that the Commanders haid landit, and he haid commandit tham to thair schipe againe till the Magistrates of the town haid advysit, and the Spainyarts haid humblie obeyit: Therfor desyrit me to ryse and heir upe I got with diligence, and assembling the honest men of the town, cam to the Tolbuthe [Tolbooth]; and efter consultation taken to heir tham, and what answer to mak, ther presentes us a verie reverend man of big stature, and grave and stout countenance, grey-heared, and verie humble lyk, wha, efter mikle and verie law courtessie, bowing down with his face neir the ground, and twitching my schoes with his hand, began his harang in the Spanise toung, wharof I understud the substance; and being about to answer in Latine, he haiffing onlie a young man with him to be his interpreter, began and tauld ower againe to us in guid Einglis. The sum was, that King Philipe, his maister, haid riget out a navie and armie to land in Eingland for just causes to be advengit of manie intolerable wrangs quhilk he haid receavit of that nation; but God for ther sinnes haid bein against thame, and be storme of wather haid dryven the navie by the cost of Eingland, and him with a certean of Capteanes, being the Generall of twentie hulks, upon an yll of Scotland, called the Fear Yll, wher they maid schipewrak, and whar sa monie as haid eschapit the merciles sies and rokes, haid mair nor sax or sevin wouks suffred grait hunger and cauld, till conducing that bark out of Orkney, they war com hither as to thair speciall frinds and confederats to kiss the King's Majestie's hands of Scotland, (and thairwith bekkit even to the yeard) and to find releiff and comfort thairby to him selff, these gentilmen Capteanes, and the poore souldarts, whase condition was for the present maist miserable and pitifull.

I answerit this mikle, in soum: That whowbeit nather our frindschipe, quhilk could nocht be grait, seg ther King and they war frinds to the graitest enemie of Chryst, the Pape of Rome, and our King and we defyed him, nor yit thair cause against our nibours and speciall frinds of Eingland could procure anie benefit at our hands for thair releiff and confort; nevertheles, they sould knaw be experience, that we war men, and sa moved be human compassione, and Christiannes of better relligion nor they, quhilk sould kythe, in the fruicts and effect, plan contrar to thars. For wheras our peiple resorting amangs tham in peacable and lawfull effeares of merchandise, war violentlie takin and cast in prisone, thair guids and gear confiscat, and thair bodies committed to the crewall flaming fyre for the cause of Relligion, they sould find na thing amangs us bot Christian pitie and warks of mercie and almes, leaving to God to work in thair harts concerning Relligion as it pleased him.

This being trewlie reported again to him be his trunshman, with grait reverence he gaiff thankes, and said he could nocht mak answer for thair Kirk and the lawes and ordour thairof, onlie for him selff, that ther war divers Scotsmen wha knew him, and to whome he haid schawin courtesie and favour at Calles [Calais], and as he supposit, sum of this sam town of Anstruther: Sa schew him that the Bailyies granted him licence with the Capteanes, to go to thair ludging for thair refreschment, bot to nane of thair men to land, till the ower-lord of the town war advertised, and understand the King's Majestie's mynd anent thame. Thus with grait courtessie he departed. That night, the Laird being advertised, cam, and on the morn, accompanied with a guid nomber of the gentilmen of the countrey round about, gaiff the said Generall and the Capteanes presence, and efter the sam speitches, in effect, as befor, receavit tham in his hous, and interteined tham humeanlie, and sufferit the souldiours to com a-land, and ly all togidder, to the number of threttin score [260], for the maist part young berdles men, sillie, trauchled, and houngered, to the quhilk a day or twa, keall, pattage, and fische was giffen; for my advyse was conforme to the Prophet Elizeus his to the King of Israel, in Samaria, "Giff tham bread and water".

The names of the commanders war Jan Gomes de Medina, Generall of twentie houlkes, Capitan Patricio, Capitan de Legoretto, Capitan de Luffera, Capitan Mauritio, and Seingour Serrano. Bot verelie all the whyll my hart melted within me. for desyre of thankfulnes to God, when I rememberit the prydfull and crewall naturall of they peiple, and whow they wald haiff usit us in ceas they haid landit with thair forces amangs us; and saw the wounderfull wark of God's mercie and justice in making us sie tham, the cheiff commanders of tham to mak sic dewgard and curtessie to pure simen, and thair souldarts' so abjectlie to beg almes at our dures and in our streites.

In the mean tyme, they knew nocht of the wrak of the rest, but supposed that the rest of the armie was saifflie returned, till at day I gat in St Androis in print the wrak of the Galliates [galleons] in particular, with the names of the principall men, and whow they war usit in Yrland and our Hilands, in Walles, and uther partes of England; the quhilk when I recordit to Jan Gomes, be particular and speciall names, O then he cryed out for greiff, bursted and grat. This Jan Gomes schew grait kyndnes to a schipe of our town, quhilk he fund arrested at Calles [Calais] at his ham-coming, red to court for hir, and maid grait rus [praise] of Scotland to his King, tuk the honest men to his hous, and inquyrit for the Lard of Anstruther, for the Minister, and his host, and send hame manie commendationes. Bot we thanked God with our hartes, that we haid sein tham amangs us in that forme.
