= North Haven (harbour) =

Coordinates: 59°32′18″N 1°36′17″W

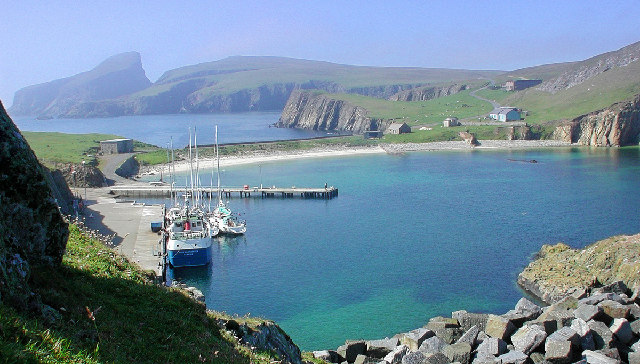

- Location within Scotland
- Country: Scotland
- Sovereign state: United Kingdom
- Police: Scotland
- Fire: Scottish
- Ambulance: Scottish

North Haven is a natural cove, developed in the 20th century as one of the primary ports of Fair Isle, an outlying island of the Shetland Isles in the North Sea off the Scottish mainland.
