= Fair Isle Airport =

Airport on Fair Isle, Scotland

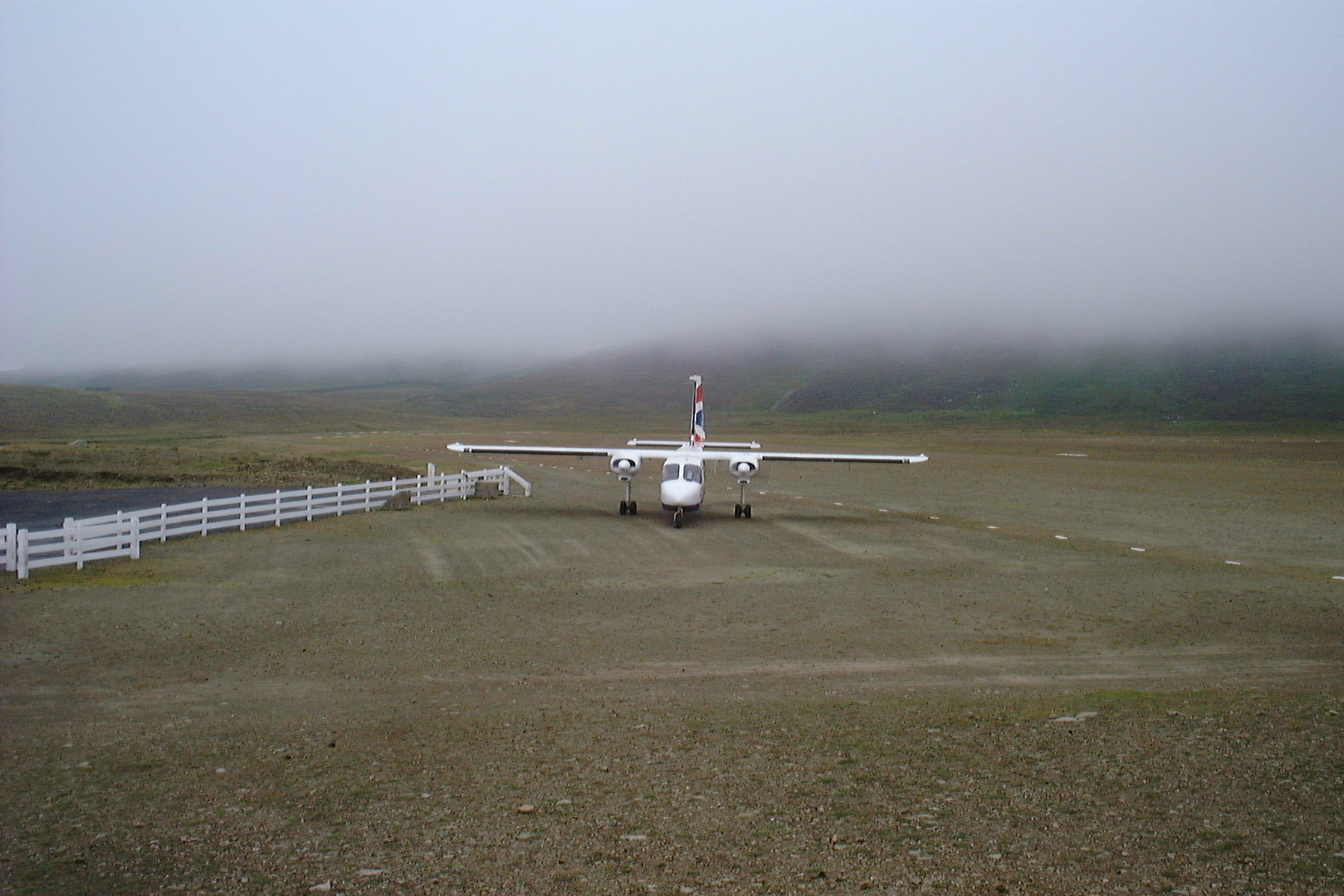
- IATA: FIE; ICAO: EGEF

Summary
- Airport type: Private
- Owner/Operator: National Trust for Scotland
- Location: Fair Isle, Shetland, Scotland
- Elevation AMSL: 237 ft / 72 m
- Coordinates: 59°32′05″N 001°37′43″W
- Website: fairisle.org.uk/travel

Map
- Location on Fair Isle

Runways
Direction	Length		Surface
Direction	m	ft	Surface
06/24	537	1,762	Gravel
- Sources: UK AIP at NATS

Fair Isle Airport (IATA: FIE, ICAO: EGEF), is a regional airport located in Fair Isle, Shetland, Scotland. It is owned by the National Trust for Scotland.

== Licensing ==
Fair Isle Aerodrome has a CAA Ordinary Licence (Number P610) that allows flights for the public transport of passengers or for flying instruction as authorised by the licensee (The National Trust For Scotland). The aerodrome is not licensed for night use. Fixed wing aircraft, in particular Britten-Norman Islander aircraft, and helicopters use the airport regularly.

== Facilities ==
The airport has a single runway aligned northeast–southwest, designated 06/24. Passenger facilities are very limited, and there are no hangars available, although visiting aircraft can be stabled (open air) overnight for a small fee. There is no airport fire service, but the Fair Isle fire engine is on call for airport incidents, and can be requested in advance by incoming flights with at least 30 minutes' notice.

== Airlines and destinations ==
Airlines	Destinations
Directflight	Lerwick
