= Tingwall Airport =

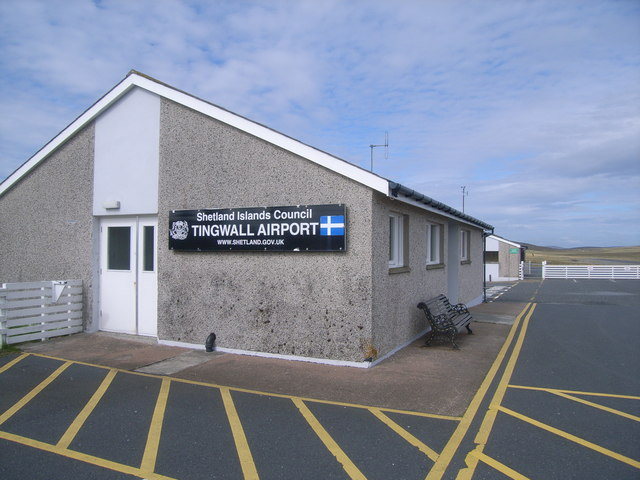
- IATA: LWK; ICAO: EGET

Summary
- Airport type: Public
- Owner: Shetland Islands Council
- Serves: Lerwick
- Location: Gott, Shetland, Scotland
- Elevation AMSL: 45 ft / 14 m
- Coordinates: 60°11′31″N 001°14′37″W

Map
- Location in Shetland

Runways
Direction	Length		Surface
Direction	m	ft	Surface
02/20	810	2,657	Asphalt

Statistics (2022)
- Movements: 702
- Passengers: 2,768
- Sources: UK AIP at NATS; Statistics: UK Civil Aviation Authority

Tingwall Airport (IATA: LWK, ICAO: EGET), also known as Lerwick/Tingwall Airport, is located in the Tingwall valley, near the village of Gott, 5 miles (7 km) northwest of Lerwick in Mainland, Shetland, Scotland. Although it is the nearest airport to Lerwick, it is not Shetland's main airport, which is Sumburgh at the south end of the main island. However, Tingwall is Shetland's inter-island flight hub.

Tingwall Aerodrome has a CAA Ordinary Licence (Number P614) that allows flights for the public transport of passengers or for flying instruction as authorised by the licensee (Shetland Islands Council). It was opened in 1976.

== Airline and destinations ==
Airlines	Destinations
Directflight	Fair Isle, Foula

== Accidents and incidents ==
In 1996, an air ambulance lost altitude while turning to final approach for Runway 02 in strong and gusting winds, crashing 1.5 km short of the runway. The pilot was killed, and the doctor and nurse in the passenger cabin were injured. (Their patient had already been delivered to Inverness.) Lack of adequate ground lighting or other visual cues during the nighttime approach was a factor.
