= Stroms Hellier =

Coordinates: 59.517°N 1.628°W

Stroms Hellier (Stroms Heelor) is a steep-sided rocky cove located off the Swartz Geo inlet on Fair Isle in the Scottish Shetland Islands.

On 27 September 1588 one of the vessels of the Spanish Armada, El Gran Grifón, foundered here during the night, and many of the ship's crew climbed her masts as she was sinking and made it to shore. According to one account, the islanders welcomed them and the Spanish behaved well and stayed for two months. According to another, the arrival of so many Spaniards nearly doubled the population of the island which was already at the subsistence level, and although the Spanish paid well for what they took, competition with the local families for resources became scarce over time, and some soldiers, weakened by lack of food and water, may even have been murdered by the locals.

An archaeological investigation was carried out in the cove in 1970 by Colin Martin and Sydney Wignall.
