= Fair Isle wren =

Scientific classification
- Kingdom: Animalia
- Phylum: Chordata
- Class: Aves
- Order: Passeriformes
- Family: Troglodytidae
- Genus: Nannus
- Species: N. troglodytes
- Subspecies: N. t. fridariensis

Trinomial name
- Nannus troglodytes fridariensis Williamson, 1951

Subspecies of bird

The Fair Isle wren (Nannus troglodytes fridariensis) is a small passerine bird in the wren family. It is a subspecies of the Eurasian wren endemic to Fair Isle, Shetland, Scotland, an island about halfway between mainland Shetland and Orkney. It was first described by the British ornithologist Kenneth Williamson in 1951.

== Description ==
The Fair Isle wren is darker and larger than the mainland form of the winter wren, though not as dark as another insular subspecies, the Shetland wren, N. t. zetlandicus.

== Distribution and habitat ==
This wren is endemic to Fair Isle, an island about halfway between mainland Shetland and Orkney. The St Kilda wren on the island of Hirta is often found nesting in crevices on the cliffs, and in association with puffin colonies, but that is not the case with the Fair Isle wren, where the low red sandstone cliffs are rather bare, with friable rock and earth slides, and small patches of tufted vegetation. The main breeding habitat of Fair Isle wrens is boulder beaches at the tip of long inlets. The boulders provide the shelter lacking on the cliffs, but even so, the windswept south-west of the island hosts few wrens. No breeding seems to occur in the crofting area, although the birds may feed here later in the year when the young are independent.

== Ecology ==
The Fair Isle wren spends much time feeding on the foreshore among the dead seaweed cast up by the tide. Their diet includes sandhoppers and other crustaceans, and the larvae of flies.

== Status ==
Fair Isle is a small island, 7.68 km^{2} (2.97 sq mi) in area, and the population of the wren is tiny, varying from ten to fifty pairs, breeding mainly on boulder beaches.
