= John Morton Boyd =

British zoologist

Dr John Morton Boyd
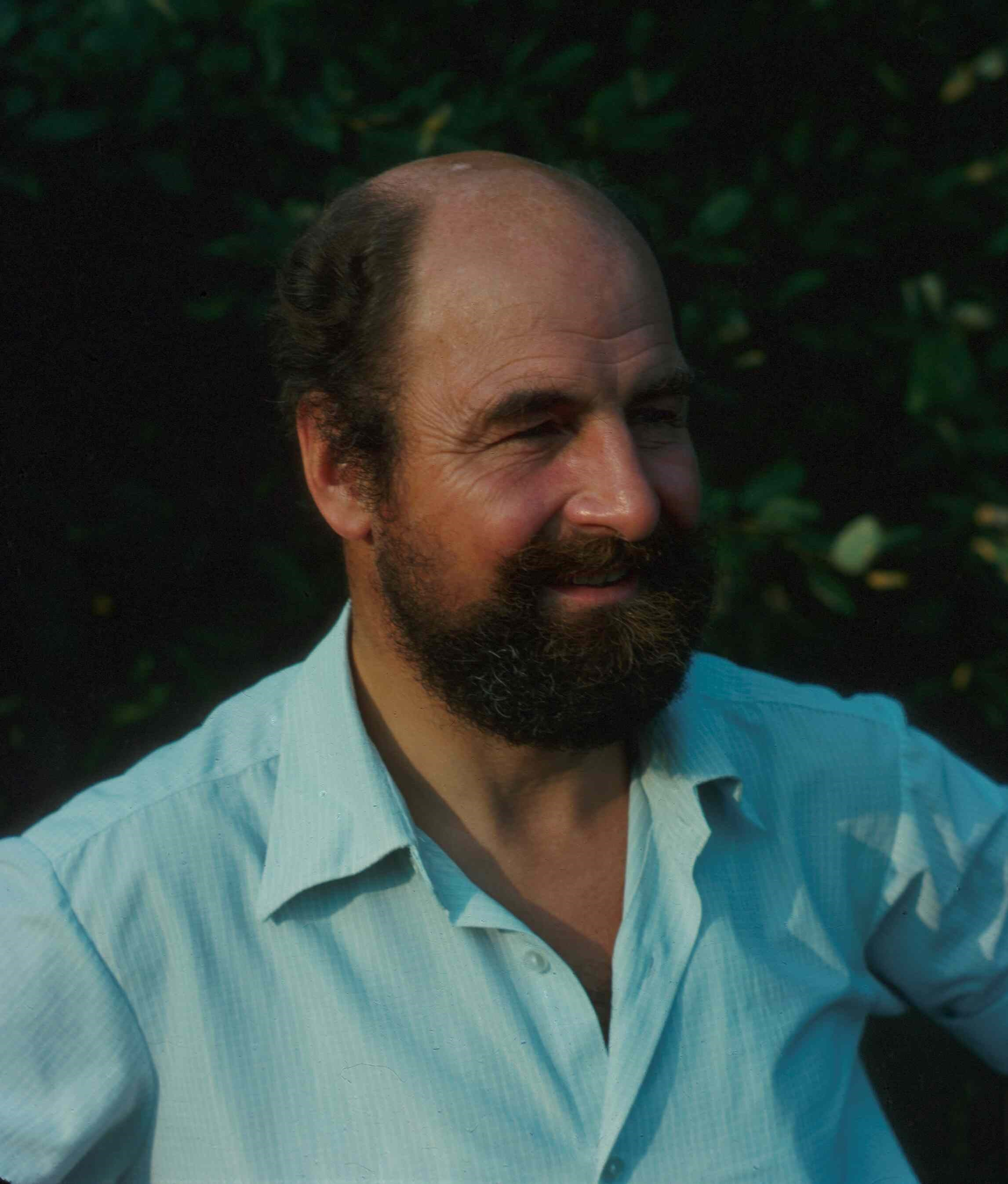
- Born: Darvel, East Ayrshire, UK
- Education: University of Glasgow
- Occupation: Conservationist

John Morton Boyd CBE FRSE (31 January 1925 – 25 August 1998) was a British zoologist, writer and conservationist. He was a pioneer of nature conservation in Scotland.

== Life ==
Boyd was born in Darvel, Ayrshire, the son of Thomas Boyd, master builder and Jeanie Morton. He was educated at Kilmarnock Academy. He then attended the University of Glasgow where he began a course in engineering before switching to zoology. As an undergraduate he studied sand dune snails on the island of Tiree in the Inner Hebrides, subsequently undertaking a doctoral study on the earthworms of the machair and further ecological research.

Boyd was influenced by the writings of Seton Gordon and Frank Fraser Darling. He visited St Kilda and recognised the potential for research into its endemic fauna, including the Soay sheep, the St Kilda wren (a subspecies of the Eurasian wren), and the St Kilda field mouse. He was also involved in research on the grey seal on North Rona.

In 1971 Boyd became the Scottish Director of the Nature Conservancy. He retired from the Conservancy in 1985, but continued to be active in conservation until his death, in Edinburgh in 1998.

He married Winifred Rome in 1954. They had four sons and one, Sir Ian L. Boyd, is also a zoologist.

== Bibliography ==
Books authored or coauthored by Boyd include:

- 1960 – St Kilda Summer. (With Kenneth Williamson). Hutchinson: London.
- 1963 – A Mosaic of Islands. (With Kenneth Williamson). Oliver & Boyd: London.
- 1969 – The Highlands and Islands. (New Naturalist no.6, 2nd edition, with Frank Fraser Darling). Collins: London. ISBN 0-00-219447-3
- 1979 – The Natural Environment of the Outer Hebrides. (Editor). Royal Society of Edinburgh & Nature Conservancy Council.
- 1983 – Natural Environment of the Inner Hebrides. Proceedings of the Royal Society of Edinburgh, vol 83.
- 1986 – Fraser Darling's Islands. Edinburgh University Press. ISBN 0-85224-514-9
- 1990 – The Hebrides. A natural history. (New Naturalist series, with Ian L. Boyd). Collins: London.
- 1992 – Fraser Darling In Africa: a rhino in the whistling thorn. Edinburgh University Press. ISBN 0-7486-0368-9
- 1996 – The Hebrides, a habitable land? (With Ian L. Boyd). Birlinn Ltd: Edinburgh. ISBN 1-874744-55-6
- 1999 – The Song of the Sandpiper: Memoir of a Scottish Naturalist. Colin Baxter Photography Ltd: Grantown-on-Spey. ISBN 1-84107-003-3
