= Ian L. Boyd =

British zoologist (born 1957)

Sir Ian Boyd
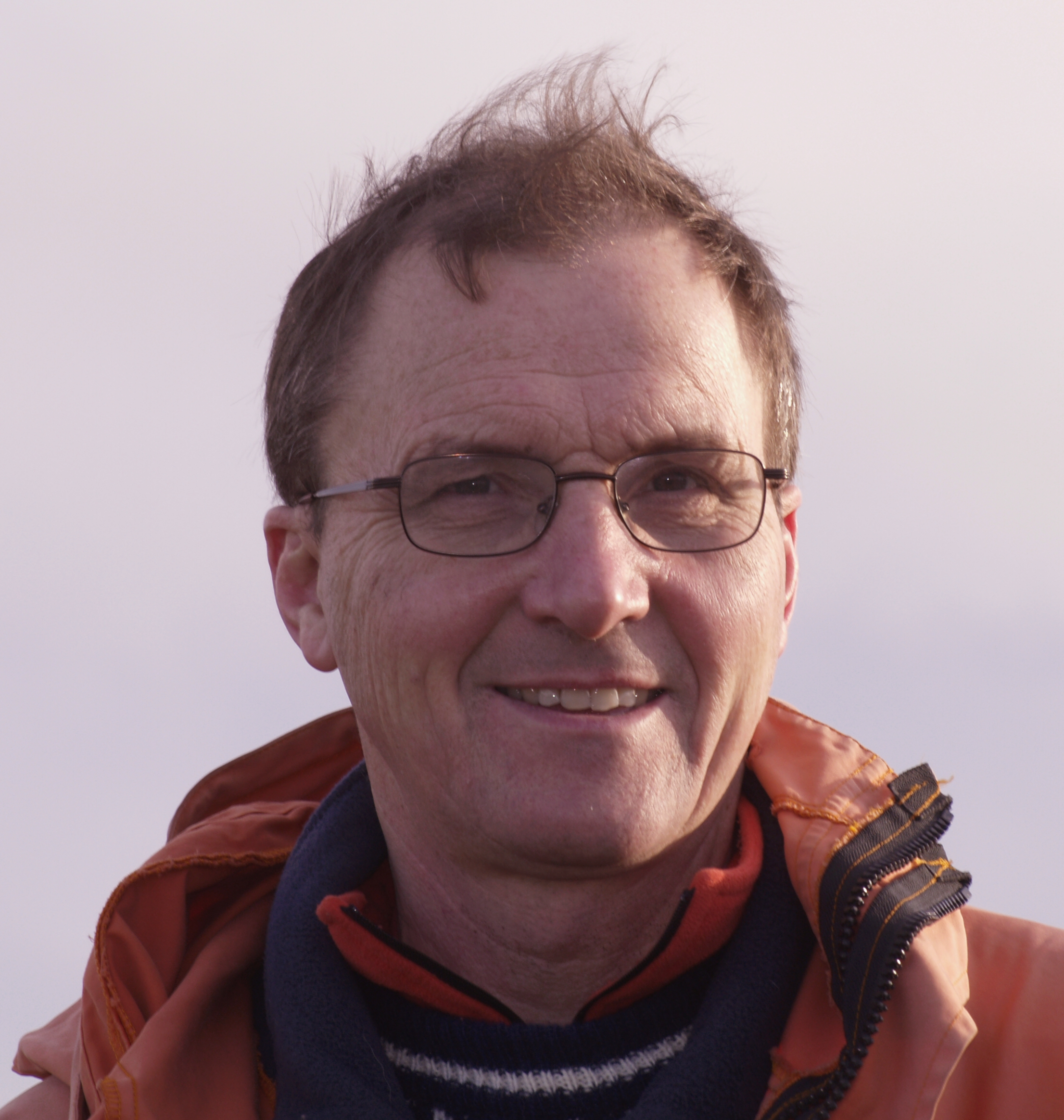
- Born: Ian Lamont Boyd; 9 February 1957 (age 69); Kilmarnock, Scotland
- Education: University of Aberdeen and St John's College, Cambridge
- Occupation: Scientist
- Known for: Chief Scientific Adviser, Defra (2012-2019)
- Spouse: Sheila Margaret Elizabeth Aitken (m. 1982)
- Children: One son, two daughters
- Awards: Scientific Medal, Zoological Society of London (1998); W.S. Bruce Medal for Polar Science (1995); FRSE (2002); Polar Medal (2017); Knight Bachelor (2019); Fellow of the Royal Society (2021)
- Scientific career
- Thesis: Reproduction in grey seals (1983)
- Doctoral advisor: Richard Harrison FRS and Richard Laws FRS

Sir Ian Lamont Boyd, FRSE, FRSB, FRS (born 9 February 1957) is a Scottish zoologist, environmental and polar scientist, former Chief Scientific Adviser at the Department for Environment, Food and Rural Affairs (DEFRA) and is a professor of biology at the University of St Andrews. He has been chair of the UK Research Integrity Office and is president of the Royal Society of Biology.

== Early life and education ==
He is son of the zoologist and conservationist John Morton Boyd. He attended the independent George Heriot's School in Edinburgh. He went to the University of Aberdeen from 1975 where he graduated with a 1st class Degree in Zoology in 1979. He subsequently went to St John's College, Cambridge until 1982 and received a PhD degree from Cambridge University in 1983. He was a Churchill Fellow in 1980. He was a pilot in the Royal Air Force Volunteer Reserve from 1975 to 1978.

== Career ==
=== Overview ===
Boyd's career has evolved from physiological ecologist with the Natural Environment Research Council Institute of Terrestrial Ecology, to a Science Programme Director with the British Antarctic Survey, Director at the Natural Environment Research Council's Sea Mammal Research Unit, Chief Scientist to the Behavioural Response Study for the US-Navy, Director for the Scottish Oceans Institute and acting Director and Chairman with the Marine Alliance for Science and Technology for Scotland. He has also been the Chief Executive or board member of several companies including for the University of St Andrews and Fera Science Ltd. He is currently Professor in Biology at the University of St Andrews and was Chief Scientific Adviser to the Department for Environment, Food and Rural Affairs (Defra) from 2012 to 2019. He is also currently on the board of UK Research and Innovation(UKRI) and is co-chair with Scotland's First Minister of the First Minister's Environment Council.

In parallel to his formal positions he has chaired, co-chaired or directed international scientific assessments; his activities focusing upon the management of human impacts on the environment.

He was responsible for establishing the Scottish Oceans Institute at the University of St Andrews and the Marine Alliance for Science and Technology for Scotland (MASTS), a cross-institutional research pool including eight of Scotland's universities. As Director of the NERC Sea Mammal Research Unit he was responsible for providing scientific advice to Defra and the Scottish Government about policies related to marine mammals. He has been a member of the Scottish Science Advisory Council and is on the Board of Reviewing Editors of Science. He was Editor-in-Chief of the Journal of Zoology from 2006 to 2008. He sits on the judging panel for the St Andrews Prize for the Environment.

=== DEFRA ===
His position as a Director General and Chief Scientific Adviser at Defra was announced on 24 April 2012 and he took up his post on 1 September 2012. In 2017 he announced that he would be leaving Defra after five years as Chief Scientific Adviser but then agreed to stay on following the 2017 General Election when Michael Gove became the Secretary of State for Defra. He explained in a blog that Defra "is responsible for delivering the basics of life – food, water and air – in sufficient quantities and to a demanding quality standard. As a consequence, we have to deal with some of the most difficult questions facing people and the planet" and that "like many others, I cannot easily walk away from these challenges and especially when opportunities are opening up which could ratchet us along the track to improvement."

Since 2011 most government departments have had their own Chief Scientific Adviser but Defra has had a Chief Scientific Adviser since its creation in 2001. Predecessors had been Sir Howard Dalton (2002-2007) and Sir Robert Watson (2007-2012). Defra was originally formed from the Ministry for Agriculture, Fisheries and Food and part of the Department for the Environment, Transport and the Regions both of which had Chief Scientific Advisers up until the merger.

His appointment was non-political, but he served as scientific adviser to four different Secretaries of State including Owen Paterson, Liz Truss, Andrea Leadsom and Michael Gove.

=== Publications ===
==== Research ====
Boyd has published over 180 peer-reviewed scientific papers (H-index 82), 14 books and has been the author/co-author/editor of several major reports including a marine atlas of Scotland's coastal seas. He has been an author of a number of publications about fisheries management both in connection with his native Scotland and globally.

His most significant discovery has been the functional relationship between the performance of marine predators and the state of their food supply, first published in a paper in the Journal of Animal Ecology in 2001. This suggested that there was likely to be a surplus of marine production which could be exploited by fisheries before there were wider effects on marine ecosystems. Although Boyd had made this discovery in the krill-based ecosystems of the Southern Ocean, together with colleagues, he showed that this relationship was general for most marine ecosystems. They published a paper in the journal Science making the point that fisheries needed to leave at least one-third of the biomass in the ocean for other predators like seabirds.

Much of his research has focused on the studying the ecological economics of marine predators, mostly in Antarctica, and using their energy balances and behavioral and physiological responses to understand the distribution and abundance of marine resources. He has developed methods of using heart rate as a proxy for measuring metabolic rates in free-ranging animals. He then used these results to estimate the food consumption of whole populations of marine predators like seals and penguins. Other interests have included behavioral optimisation within physiological constraints using diving physiology as an example and the evolution of the economy of natural currency (e.g. energy) allocation under uncertainty.

His most recent book, titled Science and Politics was based on his experiences as a science adviser in government. He has also authored many research papers and books about marine mammals. He has studied controversial issues in marine environmental science including the interactions between marine mammals and fisheries in the Northern Gulf of Alaska and the effects of anthropogenic noise on marine organisms.

==== Popular ====
Together with his father, John Morton Boyd, he has written several books about the natural history of the Hebrides include one published in the Collins New Naturalist series.

==== Policy ====
In a 2017 article in the journal Science, "Toward pesticidovigilance", he called for a new approach to the regulation of pesticides and he made further reference to pesticides in an explanation for the decision made by the UK government in April 2018 to support further restriction by the EU on neonicotinoid pesticides. He also published a recent article in Nature, "Taking the long view", which advocated taking a systems approach to understanding the problems which governments have to manage.

In 2015, he wrote an oped in The New York Times titled "Our deadened, carbon soaked seas" with Rick Spinrad who was then the Chief Scientist at NOAA to draw attention to the dangers of ocean acidification. Also in 2015, he wrote an article on environmental forensics where he said "We breathe, eat and drink other people's pollution. The 'tragedy of the commons' has a powerful presence across the environment. It has proved difficult to design market solutions to deal with these issues of equity."

With co-author Sir Mark Walport he produced a report in 2017 on waste and resource productivity. When giving evidence to the UK Parliamentary Environment, Food and Rural Affairs Select Committee he said that it would be sensible to "bury plastic in landfill until science progresses" and that plastic waste should be stored in landfill sites until it can be mined. In 2018, also with Sir Mark Walport, he co-edited a UK Government Foresight report on the Future of the Sea.

He has also provided commentary on the use of data in government saying "Across government there may be just about as many definitions of data as there are people".

He also joined the UK's COVID-19 Scientific Advisory Group for Emergencies SAGE in late April 2020 and took part in its meetings until August 2021. In August 2022, he wrote an opinion piece in The Observer defending the way science advice was provided during the pandemic.

In 2021, he became Co-Chair (with Scotland's First Minister) of the First Minister's Environment Council.

=== Charity ===
He is Chair of the UK Research Integrity Office and is a Trustee of the UK's National Oceanography Centre and the Campaign for Science and Engineering. He has been a member of the Council of Management of the Hebridean Trust for over 20 years. Until 2023, the trust owns the Treshnish Isleas in the Hebrides and has renovated the Skerryvore lighthouse supply station at Hynish on the island of Tiree to create an outdoor centre, holiday accommodation and affordable housing.

=== Controversy ===
In July 2013, Boyd opined that "the scientific community needs to [be] avoiding suggesting that policies are either right or wrong; and being willing to make the voice of science heard by engaging with the mechanisms already available through science advisory committees, by working with embedded advisers (such as myself), and by being the voice of reason, rather than dissent, in the public arena." The sentiment is seen as controversial by such people as Naomi Klein and George Monbiot, the latter of which described the opinion as "Shut up, speak through me, don't dissent – or your behaviour will ensure that science becomes irrelevant."

In October 2013, Professor Boyd rebutted these opinions by Naomi Klein and George Monbiot. Boyd stated that the point he was making in July was that "it is not their (scientists) job to make politicians' decisions for them – when scientists start providing opinions about whether policies are right or wrong they risk becoming politicised. A politicised scientist cannot also be an independent scientist."

He was Chief Scientific Adviser at Defra through a period of controversy and change. Following the invasion of ash disease in to the UK in 2012, caused by the fungus Hymenoscyphus fraxineus, he wrote a review of the effects of tree disease on ecosystems and he also responded to criticism of some of Defra's methods used in badger culling. In 2013, he called for higher standards in policy-relevant science.

In 2007 and 2008, he was Chief Scientist for the US Navy Behavioral Response Study which examined the responses of whales to naval anti-submarine sonar. This contributed to the case of Winter v. Natural Resources Defense Council in the US Supreme Court.

== Honours and awards ==
Boyd has received numerous honours and awards recognising his contributions to science, including the Scientific Medal of the Zoological Society of London, the W. S. Bruce Medal for his research in Polar Science and has been elected as a Fellow of the Royal Society (FRS), Fellow of the Royal Society of Edinburgh (FRSE) and is a Fellow of the Royal Society of Biology (FRSB). He has held an honorary professorship at the University of Birmingham and was awarded the Antarctic Service Medal of the United States in 1995. In the same year he was awarded a DSc degree by the University of Aberdeen in 1995 for his research on mammalian physiological ecology. He led the Sea Mammal Research Unit at the University of St Andrews to the award of the Queen's Anniversary Prize in 2011. In 2017, he was awarded the Polar Medal and an honorary doctorate from the University of Exeter for his contribution to science and policy. He also has honorary doctorates from the University of Plymouth, the University of Stirling and Heriot-Watt University. In 2021, he was awarded the Medal of the Chartered Institute of Ecology and Environmental Management (CIEEM). In 2021, the University of St Andrews made him a Bishop Wardlaw Professor. In 2022, he received the Fletcher of Saltoun Award from the Saltire Society for his contribution to the cultural life of Scotland.

He was knighted in the 2019 Birthday Honours for services to science and economics on food and the environment.

== Personal life ==
He married in 1982 and has one son and two daughters. He lives in London, St Andrews and on the island of Tiree in the Hebrides.

Government offices
Preceded by	Chief Scientific Adviser for DEFRA; September 2012 –	Incumbent
Business positions
Preceded by	Editor-in-Chief of Journal of Zoology; 2006 – 2008	Succeeded by
