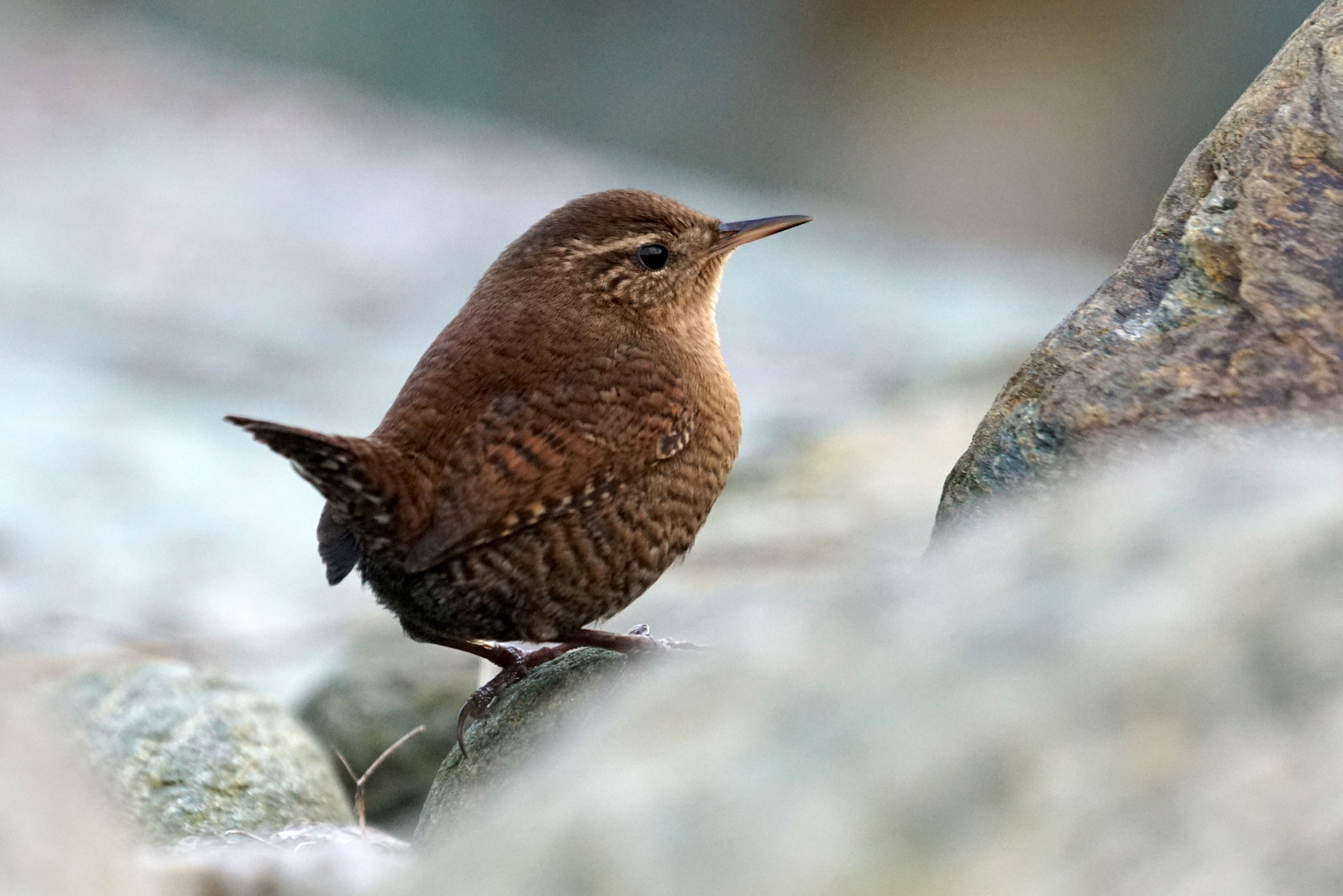

Scientific classification
- Kingdom: Animalia
- Phylum: Chordata
- Class: Aves
- Order: Passeriformes
- Family: Troglodytidae
- Genus: Nannus
- Species: N. troglodytes
- Subspecies: N. t. zetlandicus

Trinomial name
- Nannus troglodytes zetlandicus Hartert, 1910

= Shetland wren =

Subspecies of bird

The Shetland wren (Nannus troglodytes zetlandicus) is a small passerine bird in the wren family. It is a subspecies of the Eurasian wren, endemic to the Shetland archipelago of Scotland, with the exception of Fair Isle which has its own endemic subspecies, the Fair Isle wren. The Shetland wren is distinguished by its darker and more rufous-brown colouring from the mainland form, with a heavily barred underside, the barring extending from belly to breast. The bill is stouter and longer and it has stronger legs.

== Description ==
Adult birds are about 9 to 11 cm (3.5 to 4.3 in) and the sexes are similar in this species. It is a much darker subspecies of the Eurasian wren (Nannus troglodytes), especially the crown and nape which are nearly black. The barring on the upper parts is blacker and the markings on the lores and ear coverts are darker brown. The throat and breast are brownish-buff rather than white and the dark speckling on the belly extends further up the flanks and breast. The beak is dark brown and the sturdy legs are mid-brown. The song is rather louder and more varied than the Eurasian wren, perhaps to make it more audible on the boulder beaches where it mainly breeds.

== Distribution and habitat ==
This wren is endemic to the Shetland Islands. It is found on and near cliffs and rocky shores, around crofts and walls. The main breeding habitat of Shetland wrens is boulder beaches, though when population levels increase some birds will nest further inland, in bushes or beside streams.

== Status ==
An estimate of the population, dating back to the start of the 21st century, was of 1500–3000 breeding pairs.
