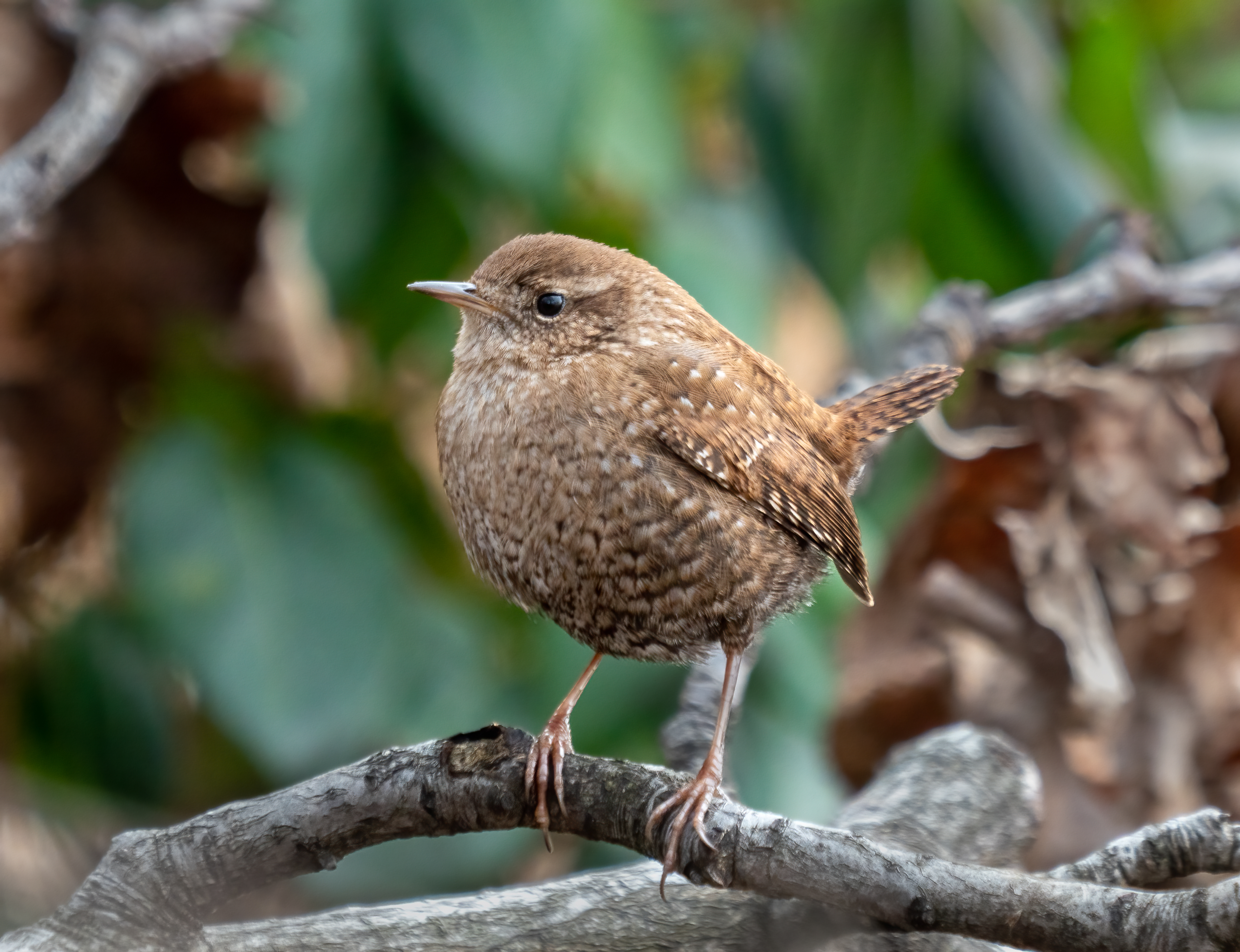
- In Prospect Park, New York

Conservation status
- Least Concern (IUCN 3.1)

Scientific classification
- Kingdom: Animalia
- Phylum: Chordata
- Class: Aves
- Order: Passeriformes
- Family: Troglodytidae
- Genus: Nannus
- Species: N. hiemalis

Binomial name
- Nannus hiemalis (Vieillot, 1819)
- Breeding Migration Year-round Nonbreeding

Synonyms
- Olbiorchilus hiemalis Troglodytes hiemalis

Audio
- Song recorded in Tahquamenon Falls State Park, Michigan

= Winter wren =

Species of bird

The winter wren (Nannus hiemalis) is a very small North American bird and a member of the mainly New World wren family Troglodytidae. The species was formerly often lumped together with Eurasian wren (Nannus troglodytes) of Eurasia and Pacific wren (Nannus pacificus) of western North America under the merged name of northern wren (with the scientific name troglodytes having priority), until they were split in 2010. Furthermore, although these three species were previously classified in the genus Troglodytes, they have been moved to the genus Nannus.

It breeds in coniferous forests from British Columbia to the Atlantic Ocean. It migrates through and winters across southeastern Canada, the eastern half the United States and (rarely) north-eastern Mexico. Small numbers may be casual in the western United States and Canada.

== Taxonomy ==
The winter wren was described and illustrated in 1808 by the American ornithologist Alexander Wilson. He was uncertain as to whether the wren should be considered a separate species or a subspecies of the Eurasian wren. When Louis Pierre Vieillot, a French ornithologist, described the winter wren in 1819 he considered it a separate species and coined the binomial name Troglodytes hiemalis. The specific epithet is Latin and means "of winter". The type locality was restricted to Nova Scotia by Harry C. Oberholser in 1902.

The winter wren was formerly considered to be conspecific with the Eurasian wren (Troglodytes troglodytes) and the Pacific wren (Troglodytes pacificus). The two North American species were split from the Eurasian wren based on a study of mitochondrial DNA published in 2007. A study published in 2008 of the songs and genetics of individuals in an overlap zone between Troglodytes hiemalis and Troglodytes pacificus found strong evidence of reproductive isolation between the two. It was suggested that the subspecies pacificus be promoted to the species level designation of Troglodytes pacificus with the common name of "Pacific wren". By applying a molecular clock to the amount of mitochondrial DNA sequence divergence between the two, it was estimated that Troglodytes pacificus and Troglodytes troglodytes last shared a common ancestor approximately 4.3 million years ago, long before the glacial cycles of the Pleistocene, which are thought to have promoted speciation in many avian systems inhabiting the boreal forest of North America.

For a while after that, the three species were classified within the genus Troglodytes; however, as the genus was found to be paraphyletic, it had long been proposed that they be reclassified into the genus Nannus. The genus was recognized by the American Ornithological Society and AviList in 2026.

Two subspecies are accepted:

- N. h. hiemalis (Vieillot, 1819) – breeds in east Canada and northeast USA, winters in southeast USA
- N. h. pullus (Burleigh, 1935) – breeds in mountains of West Virginia to Georgia (east-central USA), winters in south USA

== Description ==
Small tail is often cocked above its back, and short neck gives the appearance of a small brown ball. Rufous brown above, grayer below, barred with darker brown and gray, even on wings and tail. The bill is dark brown, and the legs are pale brown. Young birds are less distinctly barred. Most are identifiable by the pale "eyebrows" over their eyes.

Measurements:

- Length: 8–12 cm (3.1–4.7 in)
- Weight: 8–12 g (0.28–0.42 oz)
- Wingspan: 12–16 cm (4.7–6.3 in)

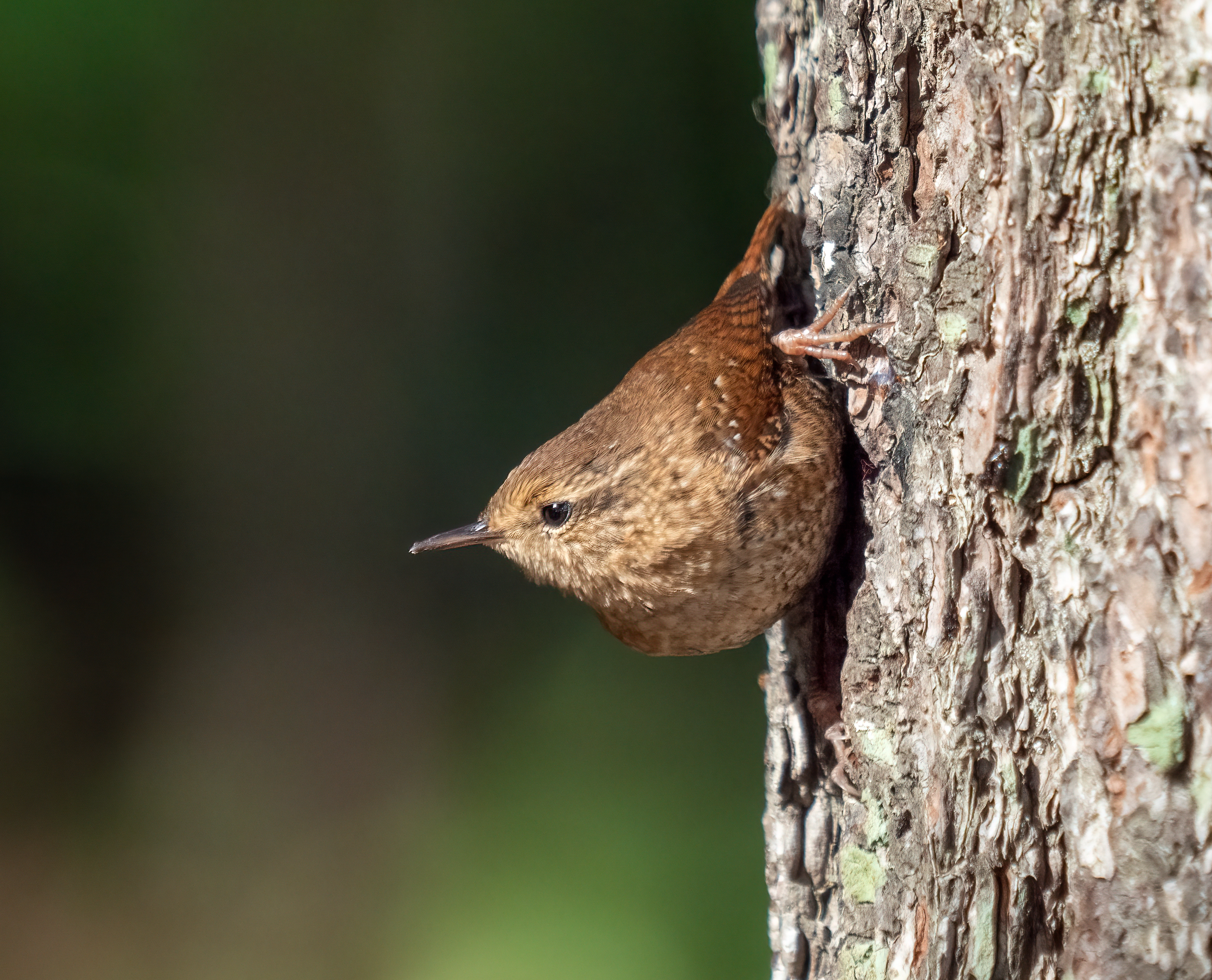
Clinging to a spruce tree during fall migration in New York.

== Distribution and habitat ==
The winter wren nests mostly in coniferous forests, especially those of spruce and fir, where it is often identified by its long and exuberant song. Although it is an insectivore, it can remain in moderately cold and even snowy climates by foraging for insects on substrates such as bark and fallen logs.

Its movements as it creeps or climbs are incessant rather than rapid; its short flights swift and direct but not sustained, its tiny round wings whirring as it flies from bush to bush.

At night, usually in winter, it often roosts, true to its scientific name, in dark retreats, snug holes and even old nests. In hard weather it may do so in parties, either consisting of the family or of many individuals gathered together for warmth.

== Behavior and ecology ==
=== Breeding ===
The male builds a small number of nests. These are called "cock nests" but are never lined until the female chooses one to use. The normal round nest of grass, moss, lichens or leaves is tucked into a hole in a wall, tree trunk, crack in a rock or corner of a building, but it is often built in bushes, overhanging boughs or the litter which accumulates in branches washed by floods. Five to eight white or slightly speckled eggs are laid in April, and second broods are reared.

=== Food and feeding ===
Winter wrens primarily eat arthropods, with preference for spiders, caterpillars, and adult beetles and flies. Other less common food items include arthropods of taxa Acari (mites and ticks), Hymenoptera (bees, wasps, and ants), Chilopoda (centipedes), Diplopoda (millipedes), and Amphipoda (amphipods).
