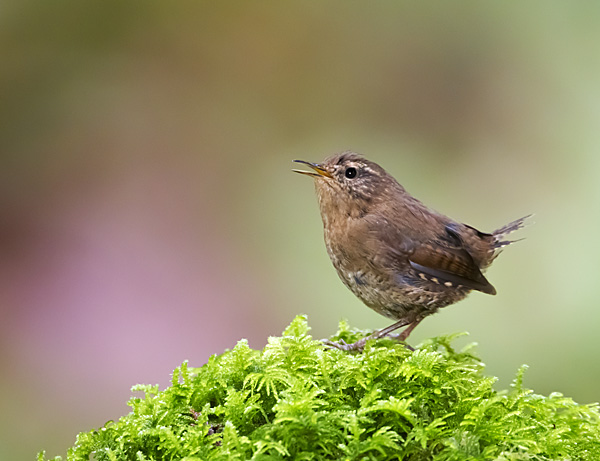

Conservation status
- Least Concern (IUCN 3.1)

Scientific classification
- Kingdom: Animalia
- Phylum: Chordata
- Class: Aves
- Order: Passeriformes
- Family: Troglodytidae
- Genus: Nannus
- Species: N. pacificus

Binomial name
- Nannus pacificus (Baird, 1864)

Synonyms
- Troglodytes pacificus

Audio

= Pacific wren =

Species of bird

The Pacific wren (Nannus pacificus) is a very small North American bird and a member of the mainly New World wren family Troglodytidae. The species was formerly lumped together with either the winter wren (Nannus hiemalis) of eastern North America alone, or also with the Eurasian wren (Nannus troglodytes) of Eurasia, then under the merged name of northern wren with the scientific name troglodytes having priority. Furthermore, although these three species were previously classified in the genus Troglodytes, they have been moved to the genus Nannus.

It breeds along the Pacific coast from Alaska to California and inland as far as Wyoming and the Black Hills of South Dakota. It migrates through and winters across the western half of the United States and Canada.

== Description ==
Rufous brown above, richly colored below, barred with darker brown and dusky, even on wings and tail. The bill is dark brown, the legs pale brown. Young birds are less distinctly barred.

== Taxonomy ==
By studying the songs and genetics of individuals in an overlap zone between N. hiemalis and N. pacificus, Toews and Irwin (2008) found strong evidence of reproductive isolation between the two. It was suggested that the pacificus subspecies be promoted to the species level designation with the common name 'Pacific wren'. By applying a molecular clock to the amount of mitochondrial DNA sequence divergence between the two, it was estimated that N. pacificus and N. troglodytes last shared a common ancestor approximately 4.3 million years ago, long before the glacial cycles of the Pleistocene, thought to have promoted speciation in many avian systems inhabiting the boreal forest of North America.

For a while after that, three species were all classified within the genus Troglodytes; however, as the genus was found to be paraphyletic, it had long been proposed that they be reclassified into the genus Nannus.. The genus was recognized by the American Ornithological Society and AviList in 2026.

== Ecology ==
The Pacific wren nests mostly in coniferous forests, especially those of spruce and fir, where it is often identified by its long and exuberant song. Although it is an insectivore, it can remain in moderately cold and even snowy climates by foraging for insects on substrates such as bark and fallen logs.

Its movements as it creeps or climbs are incessant rather than rapid; its short flights swift and direct but not sustained, its tiny round wings whirring as it flies from bush to bush.

At night, usually in winter, it often roosts, true to its scientific name, in dark retreats, snug holes and even old nests. In hard weather it may do so in parties, either consisting of the family or of many individuals gathered together for warmth.

For the most part insects and spiders are its food, but in winter large pupae are taken and some seeds.

=== Breeding ===
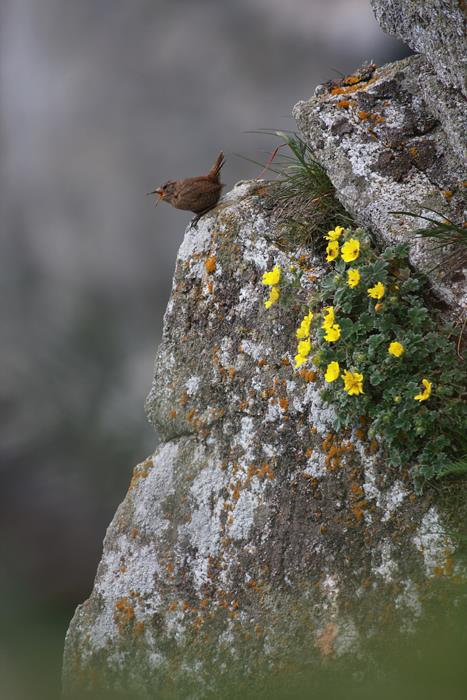
Pacific wren calling

The male builds a small number of nests. These are called "cock nests" but are never lined until the female chooses one to use. The normal round nest of grass, moss, lichens or leaves is tucked into a hole in a wall, tree trunk, crack in a rock or corner of a building, but it is often built in bushes, overhanging boughs or the litter which accumulates in branches washed by floods. Five to eight white or slightly speckled eggs are laid in April, and second broods are reared.

A particular facet of the Pacific Wren is that the males use intricate vocalizations to attract females for mating. Pacific Wrens are songbirds and the songs are used for mating purposes as well as for territorial displays. In British Columbia, Canada, male Pacific Wren have been observed to adapt their songs in the presence of highway noise. Pacific Wrens are widely known for their variety and complexity of song. In adaptation to the noise of freeway traffic, male Pacific wrens were observed to change the overall length of their songs. However, other changes in song variation and individual syllable length could not be concluded.

A variation in reproduction success has been observed at higher altitudes. In the forests of British Columbia, at higher altitudes, in 2003-2004 there was a decline in breeding compared with lower altitudes of habitation for the Pacific Wren. Specifically, the length of breeding season was shorter and the survival rates of nests were lower. However, other factors such as incubation length and the total number of eggs in each nesting attempt showed no variation due to elevation. Although the Pacific Wren overall lacked adaptation to higher altitudes, there was a small percentage of Pacific Wrens that were able to successfully reproduce at these higher elevations.

Adaptations in breeding patterns within urban landscapes were observed in the Seattle, Washington area and its surrounding forests. In the developing urban ecosystems of the city, Pacific Wren fled and relocated to nearby forests. Due to this change of location, breeding success for those Pacific Wren declined significantly. The proportion of wrens returning to the same urban nest in the greater Seattle, Washington area was in some cases observed to be as low as 0%. In this case, the Pacific Wren's relocation in conjunction with its inability to cultivate a successful new nesting site is what contributed to the decline in reproduction.

In contrast, a close relative of the Pacific Wren, the Bewick's wren has been highly successful at thriving in certain urban environments. This stands in polarity to the Pacific Wren's diminished numbers in urban areas. Moreover, the Bewick's Wren, otherwise known as Thryomanes bewickii, has been observed to interact aggressively with the Pacific Wren. However, the exact reasons for Bewick Wren's success vs. Pacific Wren's diminishing numbers in urban areas are unclear. Overall, observations are in favor of the hypothesis that urban landscapes foster aggressive and combative interactions between native species.

== Cultural depictions ==
The 1999 U.S. postage stamp Pacific Coast Rain Forest sheet features a stamp with a "winter wren (Troglodytes troglodytes)"; this bird was subsequently classified as the Pacific wren. The narrator of "The White Seal" story of The Jungle Book by Rudyard Kipling is Limmershin, a "winter wren", actually the Pacific wren.
