= Eurasian wren =

- Nominate subspecies in Franconville, France Song of male bird recorded in Scotland Calls recorded in Surrey, England

Conservation status
- Least Concern (IUCN 3.1)

Scientific classification
- Kingdom: Animalia
- Phylum: Chordata
- Class: Aves
- Order: Passeriformes
- Family: Troglodytidae
- Genus: Nannus
- Species: N. troglodytes

Binomial name
- Nannus troglodytes (Linnaeus, 1758)
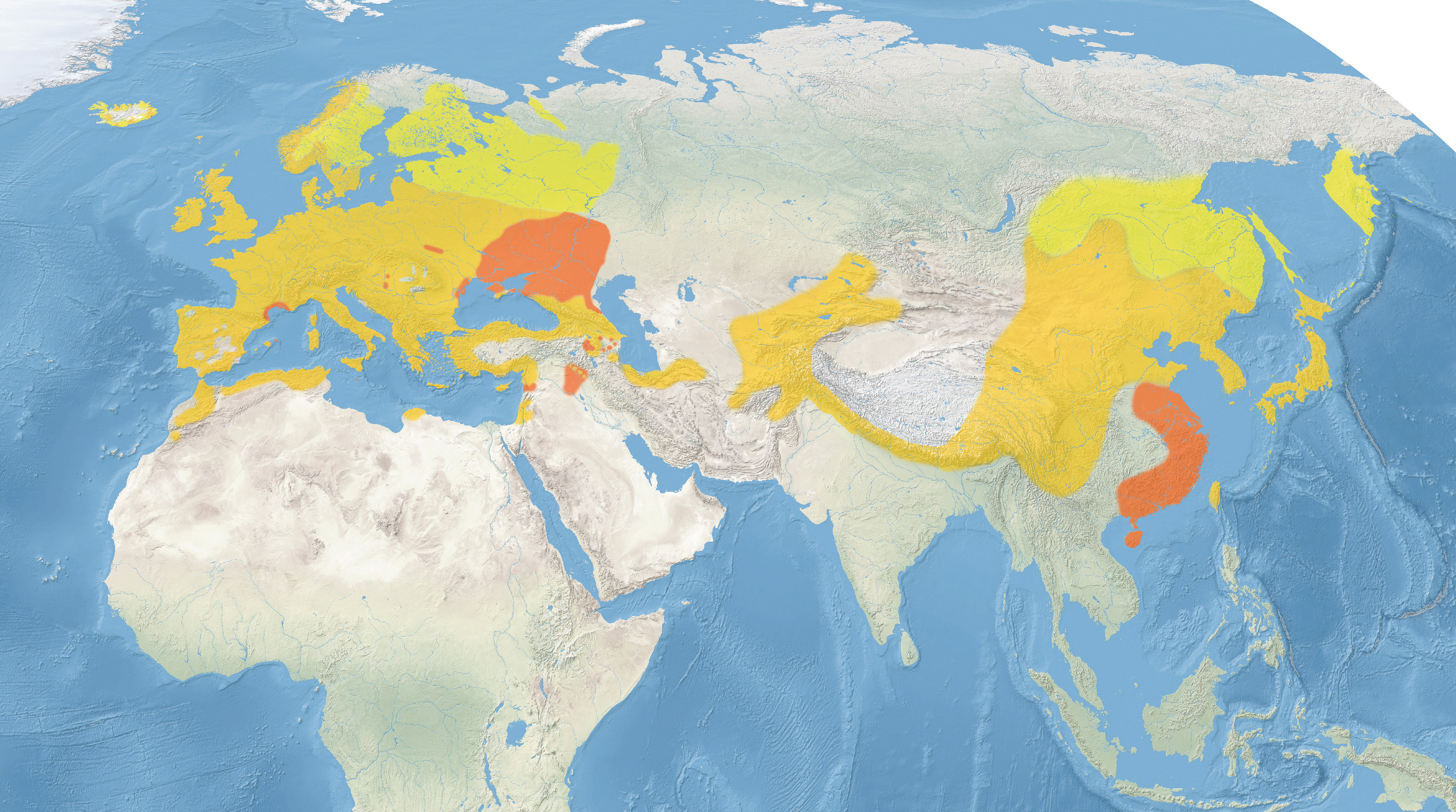
- Breeding summer visitor Breeding resident Non-breeding winter visitor

Synonyms
- Motacilla troglodytes Linnaeus, 1758; Troglodytes troglodytes (Linnaeus, 1758); Troglodytes parvulus K. L. Koch, 1816

Species of bird

The Eurasian wren (Nannus troglodytes) is a very small insectivorous bird and the only member of the wren family found in the Old World, specifically in Eurasia and Africa (Maghreb). In Anglophone Europe, it is commonly known simply as the wren. It has a very short tail which is often held erect, a short neck and a relatively long thin bill. It is russet brown above, paler buff-brown below, overall finely barred darker, and has a cream buff supercilium. The sexes are alike.

The Eurasian wren occurs in Europe and across the Palearctic, including a belt of Asia from northern Iran and Afghanistan across to Japan. It is migratory in the northern (particularly northeastern), parts of its range, and sedentary in the west and south of its range. It is also highly polygynous, an unusual mating system for passerines. The species was formerly lumped together with winter wren (Nannus hiemalis) of eastern North America and Pacific wren (Nannus pacificus) of western North America under the merged name of northern wren. Furthermore, although these three species were previously classified in the genus Troglodytes, they have since been moved to the genus Nannus due to the paraphyly of the genus.

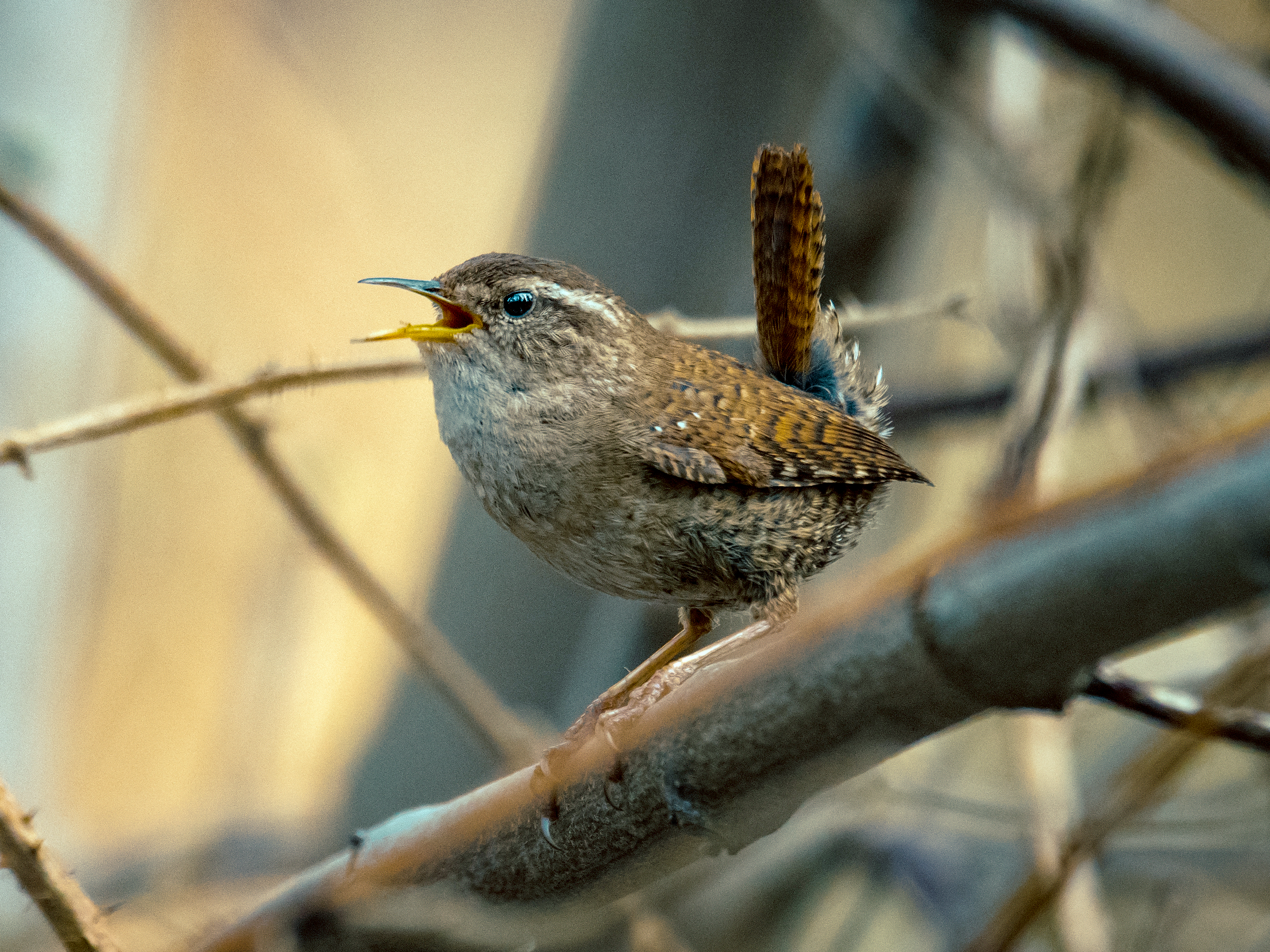
N. t. kabylorum in Tunisia

== Taxonomy ==
The Eurasian wren was described by the Swedish naturalist Carl Linnaeus in 1758 in the tenth edition of his Systema Naturae under the binomial name Motacilla troglodytes. The specific epithet is from the Ancient Greek trōglodutēs meaning "cave-dweller". In 1555 the German naturalist Conrad Gessner had used the Latin name Passer troglodyte for the Eurasian wren in his Historiae animalium.

The Eurasian wren was formerly considered conspecific with two North American species, the winter wren (Nannus hiemalis) and the Pacific wren (Nannus pacificus).

For a while after that, the three species were classified within the genus Troglodytes; however, as the genus was found to be paraphyletic, it had long been proposed that they be reclassified into the genus Nannus that was described by the Swedish naturalist Gustaf Johan Billberg in 1828 with the Eurasian wren as the type species.. The genus name Nannus is derived from the Ancient Greek word ναννος (nannos), meaning "dwarf". Nannus was recognized as a valid genus by the American Ornithological Society and AviList in 2026.

It was estimated that Nannus pacificus and Nannus troglodytes last shared a common ancestor approximately 4.3 million years ago, long before the glacial cycles of the Pleistocene, thought to have promoted speciation in many avian lineages inhabiting the boreal forest of North America.

=== Subspecies ===
Currently, 28 subspecies of this taxonomically complex bird are accepted:

- Nannus troglodytes islandicus Hartert, EJO, 1907. Iceland.
- Nannus troglodytes borealis Fischer, JCH, 1861. Faroe Islands.
- Nannus troglodytes zetlandicus Hartert, EJO, 1910. Scotland (Shetland).
- Nannus troglodytes fridariensis Williamson, K, 1951. Scotland (Fair Isle).
- Nannus troglodytes hirtensis Seebohm, H, 1884. Scotland (St Kilda).
- Nannus troglodytes hebridensis Meinertzhagen, R, 1924. Scotland (Outer Hebrides).
- Nannus troglodytes indigenus Clancey, PA, 1937. Ireland, Inner Hebrides, Orkney, Great Britain mainland.
- Nannus troglodytes troglodytes (Linnaeus, C, 1758). Continental Europe and Turkey.
- Nannus troglodytes kabylorum Hartert, EJO, 1910. Northwestern Africa (Morocco to Tunisia), Southern Iberian Peninsula, Balearic Islands (but see below).
- Nannus troglodytes koenigi Schiebel, G, 1910. Corsica and Sardinia.
- Nannus troglodytes juniperi Hartert, EJO, 1922. Northern Libya (Cyrenaica).
- Nannus troglodytes cypriotes (Bate, DMA, 1903). Crete, Rhodes, Cyprus, Near East.
- Nannus troglodytes hyrcanus Zarudny, NA; Loudon, HGG, 1905. Crimean Peninsula to Caucasus Mountains, northern Iraq, Iran.
- Nannus troglodytes tianschanicus Sharpe, RB, 1882. Mountains of Central Asia from Tien Shan (possibly from Altai) south to Pamir and northeastern Afghanistan.
- Nannus troglodytes subpallidus Zarudny, NA; Loudon, HGG, 1905. Himalayas of Afghanistan.
- Nannus troglodytes magrathi (Whitehead, CHT, 1907). Mountains on borders of Pakistan and Afghanistan.
- Nannus troglodytes neglectus Brooks, WE, 1872. Western Himalaya (Gilgit to western Nepal).
- Nannus troglodytes nipalensis Blyth, E, 1845. Central and eastern Himalaya from central Nepal to northeastern Assam and southern Tibet.
- Nannus troglodytes idius (Richmond, CW, 1907). Northern China (southern Hebei to Shandong).
- Nannus troglodytes szetschuanus Hartert, EJO, 1910. Southwestern China (southern Shaanxi and Sichuan eastward to Hupei).
- Nannus troglodytes talifuensis (Sharpe, RB, 1902). Western China (southern Sichuan to western Yunnan) and northeastern Myanmar.
- Nannus troglodytes dauricus Dybowski, BT; Taczanowski, W, 1884. Eastern Siberia to Sakhalin, Manchuria, and Korea.
- Nannus troglodytes pallescens (Ridgway, R, 1883). Kamchatka Peninsula and Komandorskiye Islands.
- Nannus troglodytes kurilensis Stejneger, LH, 1889. Northern Kuril Islands (Shasukotan and Ushichi).
- Nannus troglodytes fumigatus Temminck, CJ, 1835. Japan, southern Kuril Islands.
- Nannus troglodytes mosukei Momiyama, T, 1923. Eastern Japan (Izu Islands and Daito Islands).
- Nannus troglodytes ogawae Hartert, EJO, 1910. Southern Japan (Tanegashima and Yakushima).
- Nannus troglodytes taivanus Hartert, EJO, 1910. Taiwan.

Only limited genetic studies have been carried out to date, but show the subspecies may need further revision. Most notably, the northwest African population (N. t. kabylorum sensu stricto) and the Cyrenaican population (N. t. juniperi) are genetically highly distinct and may not even belong in N. troglodytes at all, being sister to the rest of N. troglodytes plus N. hiemalis (winter wren, of eastern North America). Conversely, the Iberian Peninsula birds currently included in N. t. kabylorum are very close to nominate N. t. troglodytes.

In Scotland, in addition to the typical bird N. t. indigenus widespread in Britain and Ireland, there are four distinct insular subspecies; one, N. t. hirtensis, is confined to the island of St Kilda; another, N. t. zetlandicus, to Shetland; the third, N. t. fridariensis, to Fair Isle; and the fourth, N. t. hebridensis, to the Outer Hebrides. The St Kilda wren (N. t. hirtensis) is greyer above, whiter beneath, with more abundant bars on the back; the Shetland wren (N. t. zetlandicus) and Fair Isle wren (N. t. fridariensis) are darker. Other isolated northwestern European island subspecies include N. t. islandicus on Iceland and N. t. borealis on the Faroe Islands. Not all of these are accepted by all authors though; Shirihai & Svensson (2019) merged N. t. indigenus, N. t. zetlandicus, N. t. fridariensis, and N. t. hebridensis into a broader concept of a widespread oceanic climate subspecies N. t. borealis and retaining only the highly isolated N. t. hirtensis as distinct; they also included southeast English birds in nominate N. t. troglodytes.

An additional disputed subspecies N. t. orii, the Daito wren, became extinct around 1940, if it was ever a valid taxon and not merely a vagrant of another subspecies; in an analysis of Eurasian wren subspecies, the ornithologist Charles Vaurie concuded it was a synonym of N. t. mosukei.

== Description ==
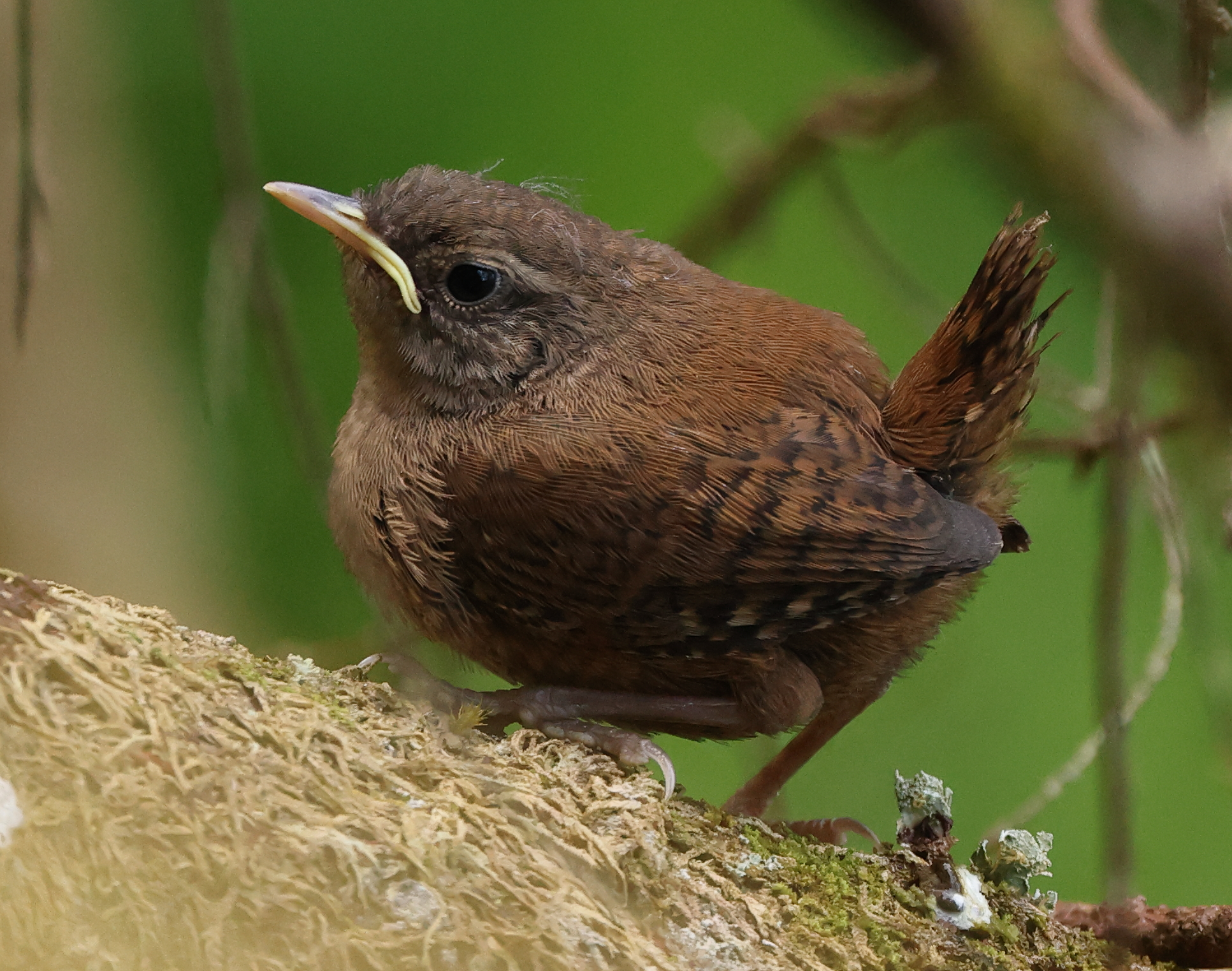
Juvenile Eurasian wren in Norway

The Eurasian wren is a plump, sturdy bird with rounded wings and a short tail, which is usually held cocked up. It is 9 to 10 cm (3.5 to 3.9 in) in length and has a wingspan of 13–17 cm (5.1–6.7 in). It weighs around 10 g (0.35 oz). It is rufous brown above, greyer beneath, and indistinctly barred with darker brown and grey, even on the wings and tail. The bill is dark brown and the legs are pale brown, the feet having strong claws and a large hind toe. Young birds are less distinctly barred and have mottled underparts. The plumage is subject to considerable variation, and where populations have been isolated, the variation has become fixed in one minor form or another.

=== Vocal behaviour ===
Song
song

The most common call is a sharp, repeated "tic-tic-tic", similar but faster and with less isolated notes compared to that of a robin. When the bird is annoyed or excited, its call runs into an emphatic churr, not unlike clockwork running down. The song is a gushing burst of sweet music, clear, shrill and emphatic. The male has a remarkably long and complex song, with a series of tinkling trills one after the other for several seconds. The bird has an enormous voice for its size, ten times louder, weight for weight, than a cockerel. The song begins with a few preliminary notes, then runs into a trill, slightly ascending, and ends in full clear notes or another trill. The song may be heard at any time of year, though it is most noticeable during spring. Despite its generally mouse-like behaviour, the male may sing from an exposed low perch as its whole body quivers from the effort. Its song may sometimes be confused with that of the dunnock, which has a warble that is shorter and weaker. The wren's song also incorporates repeated trill sounds while the dunnock's does not.

== Distribution and habitat ==
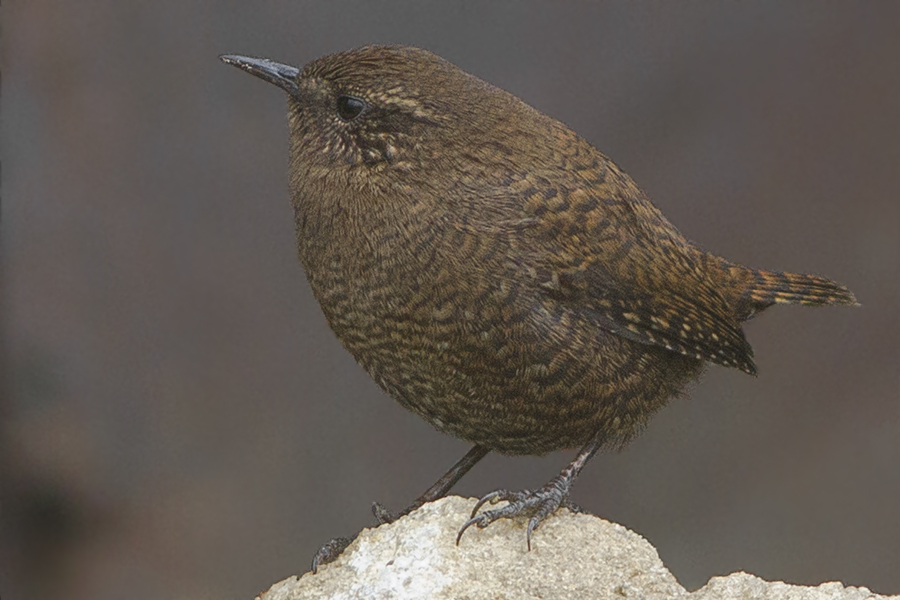
Subspecies Nannus troglodytes nipalensis with its very dark plumage in Sikkim, India

This small, stump-tailed wren is almost as familiar in Europe as the robin. It is mouse-like, easily lost sight of when it is hunting for food, but is found everywhere from the sea coast to the tops of the highest moors.

The Eurasian wren is a Palearctic species. The nominate subspecies breeds in Europe as far north as 67°N in Norway and 64°N in Sweden, Finland and Russia. Its southern limit is northern Spain, southern France, Italy, Sicily and southern Russia. It also breeds in Western Asia as far east as Syria. It is replaced by other subspecies in Iceland, the Faroe Islands, Shetland, the Hebrides, and St Kilda, and further south in northwestern Africa, Spain and Portugal, the Balearic Islands, Corsica, Sardinia, Crete and Cyprus. Other subspecies also occur in southern Russia and eastern Asia to Japan.

It occupies a great variety of habitats, typically any kind of cultivated or uncultivated area with bushes and low ground cover; gardens, hedgerows, thickets, plantations, woodland and reed beds. It inhabits more open locations with clumps of brambles or gorse, rough pasture, moorland, boulder-strewn slopes, rocky coasts and sea cliffs.

== Behaviour and ecology ==
Eurasian wren singing, Texel, Netherlands

The Eurasian wren is an ever-active bird, constantly on the move foraging for insects, in the open or among thick vegetation. It moves with quick jerks, probing into crevices, examining old masonry, hopping onto fallen logs and delving down among them. It sometimes moves higher in the canopy, but for the most part stays near the ground, often being flushed from under overhangs on banks. Sometimes it hops up the lower part of tree trunks. Occasionally it flits away, its short flights swift and direct but not usually sustained, its tiny round wings whirring as it flies. On migration, it is however capable of lengthy sustained flight; ringing recoveries of English-ringed birds in Sweden and a German-ringed bird in England, and the regular arrival of presumed Norwegian birds on the east coast of Britain north to Shetland in autumn, shows they can readily cross the over-500 km wide North Sea. The longest distance ringing recovery is of 1,524 km from Rossitten Bird Observatory in Kaliningrad, Russia, to Bosham in West Sussex, England.

The species is found in the uplands of Britain, where It frequents gardens and farms, but is equally abundant in thick woods and in reed-beds.

During winter nights, it often roosts in dark retreats, snug holes and even old nests. In case of strong weather, the wren roosts in small groups of other wren to protect themselves.

=== Breeding ===
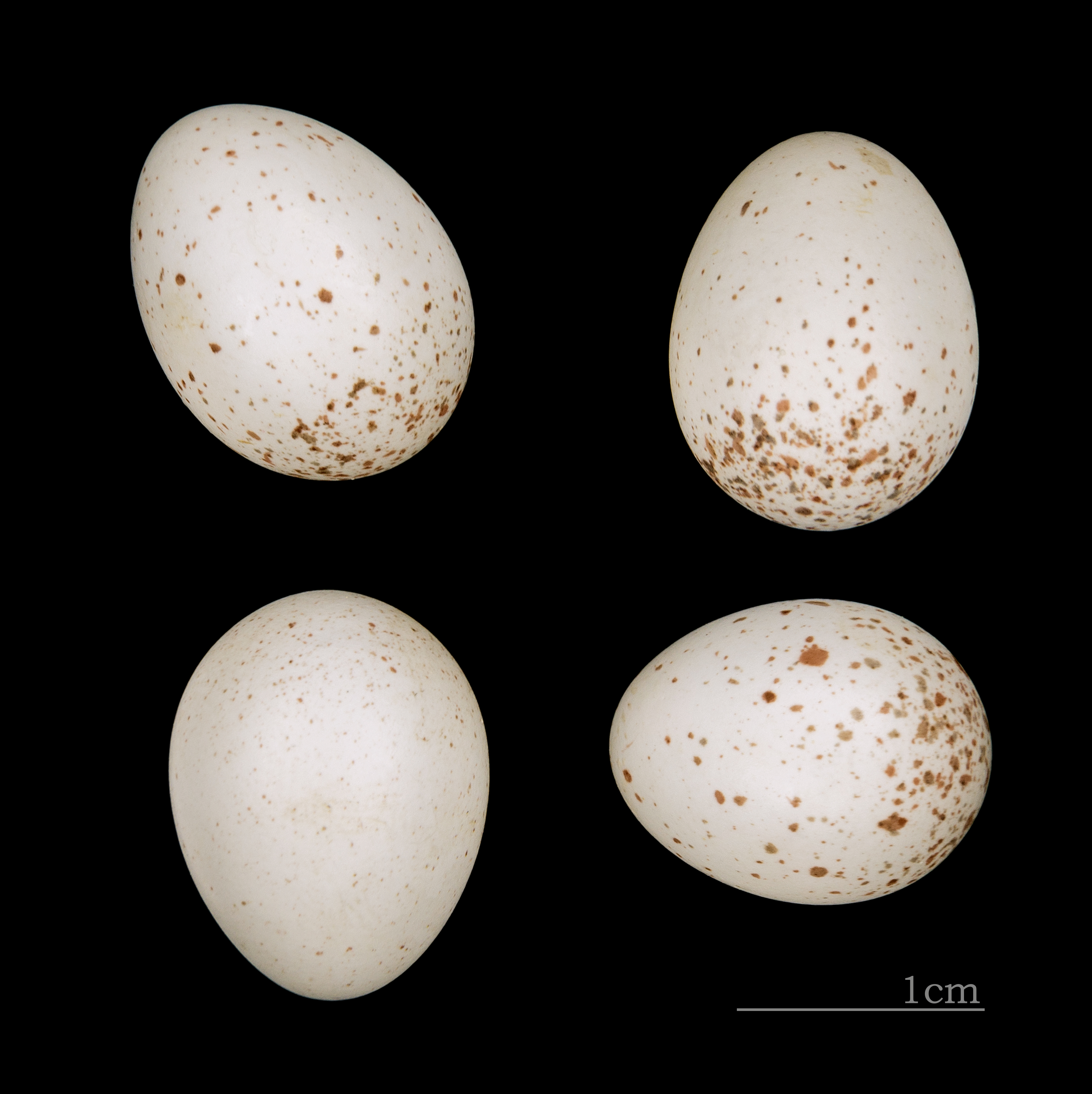
Eggs of the subspecies N. t. kabylorum - MHNT

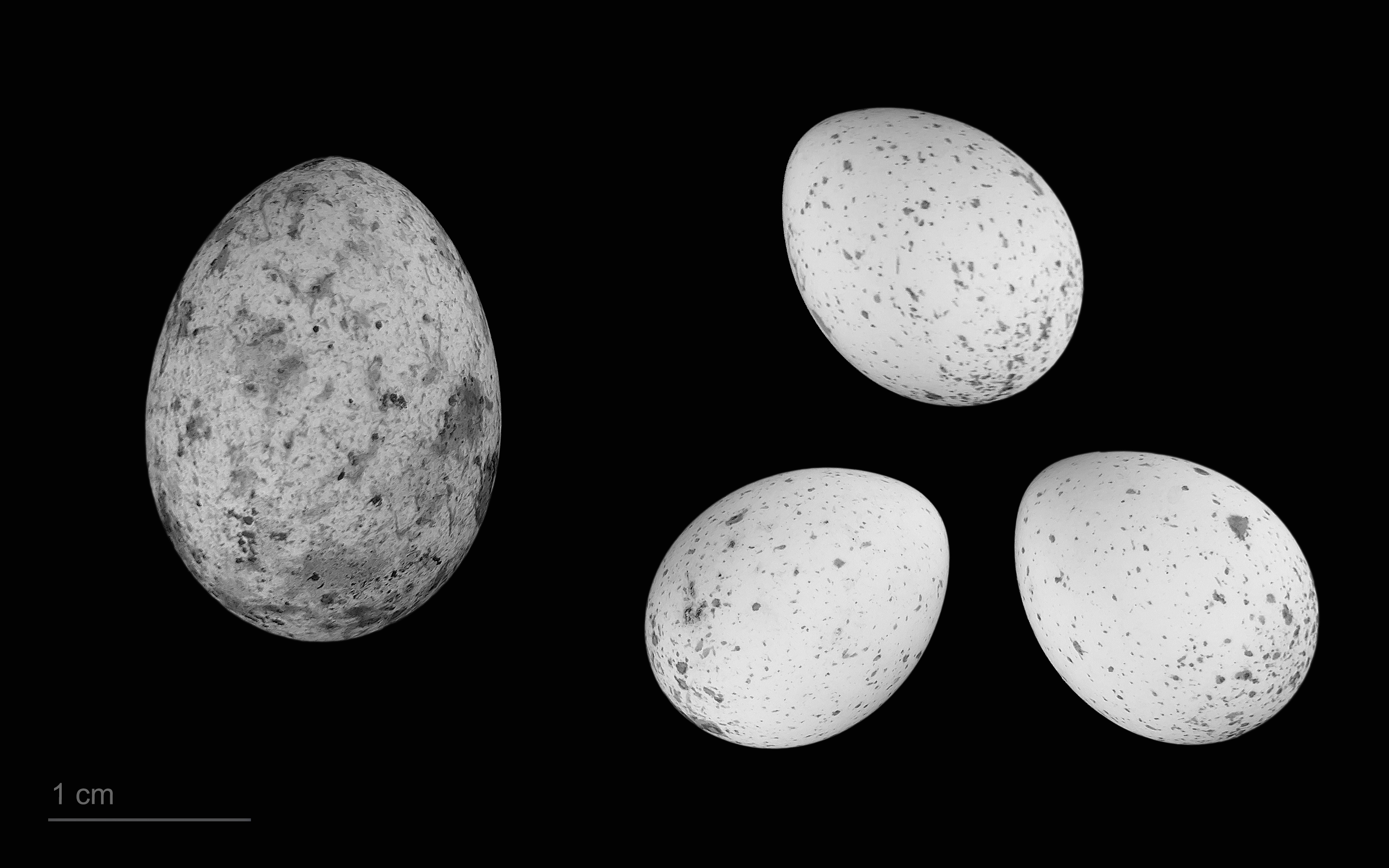
Cuculus canorus canorus egg with three eggs of Nannus troglodytes - MHNT

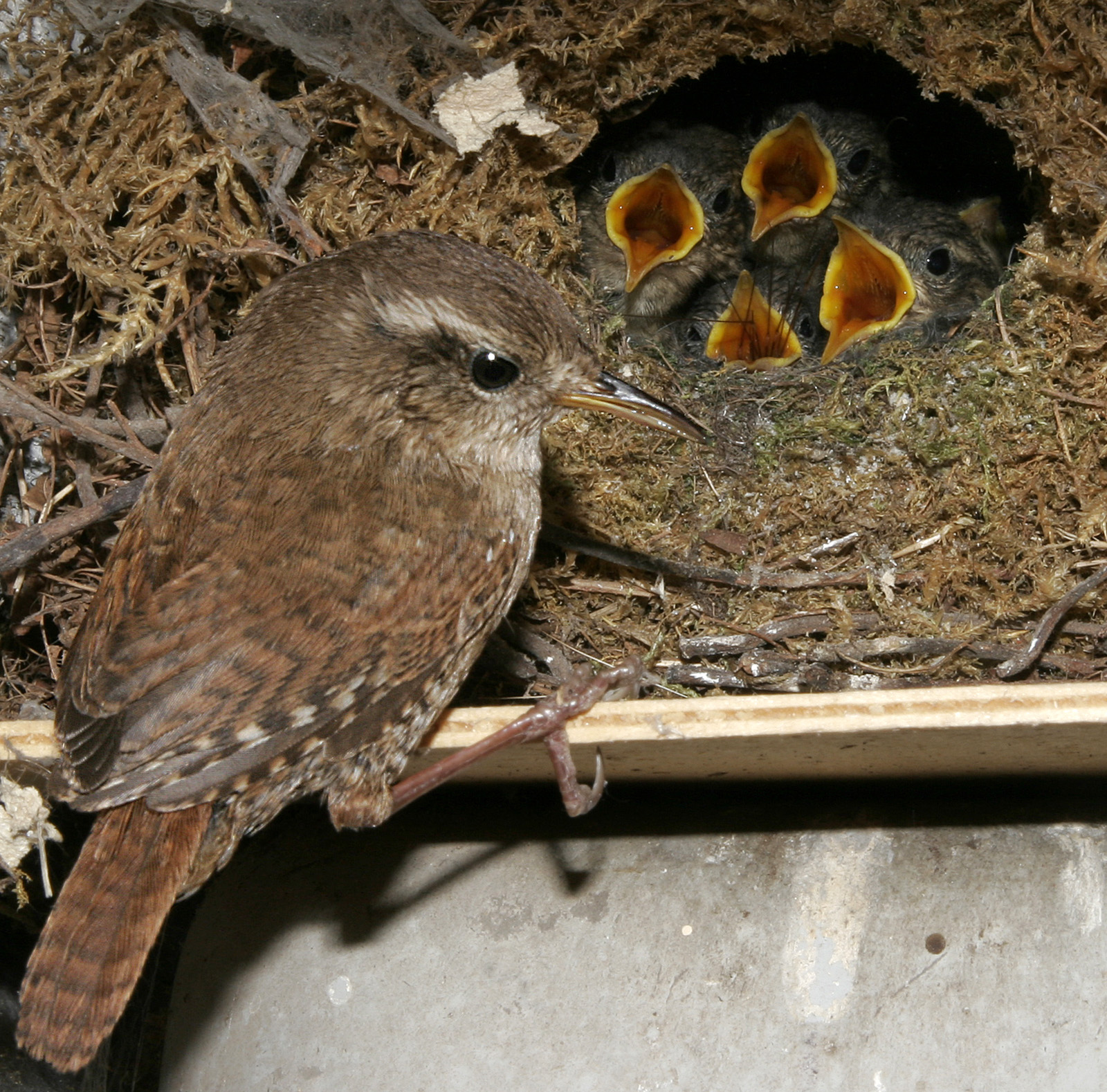
Adult with four hatchlings; one has just been fed a spider or harvestman

The Eurasian wren commonly nests in northern European and Asian coniferous forests, often identified by its long and exuberant song. Although it is an insectivore, the Eurasian wren can remain in moderately cold and even snowy climates by foraging for insects on substrates such as bark and fallen logs. The male wren builds several nests in his territory; these are called "cock nests" but are never lined until the female chooses one to use. The number of nests on a territory influences the female's choice of mate; she preferentially mates with a male that had constructed numerous nests. Courtship includes display and posturing by the male. He sings with wings and tail half open, or with them drooping, sometimes with one wing extended, or the wings may be raised and lowered several times in quick succession.

The neatly-domed nest has a side entrance and is built of grass, moss, lichen and dead leaves, whatever is available locally. It is often tucked into a hole in a wall or tree trunk or a crack in a rock, but it can also be built in brambles, a bush or a hedge, among ivy on a bank, in thatch, or in abandoned bird's nests such as those of the house sparrow, swallow, house martin and dipper. On making her selection, the female wren lines the nest generously with feathers.

A clutch of five or six (range three to eleven) eggs are laid during April and onward. The eggs average at around 16.6 by 12.7 mm (0.65 by 0.50 in) and are white with variable amounts of reddish-brown speckles, mostly on the broad end. The female alone incubates these, and they hatch after 14 to 15 days. The young are fed on insects, spiders and other small invertebrates; there is no record of the male feeding the young in the nest, but he does do so after they have fledged, which happens after about 16 days. There are usually two broods.

Wrens are highly polygamous; a male can have more than one female with an active nest on his territory at a time. An active nest is one in which there are eggs or nestlings. A male has been recorded with four females breeding on his territory. Bigamy and trigamy are the most common forms of polygamy.

=== Food and feeding ===
Insects form the bulk of their diet; these are chiefly the larvae of butterflies and moths, such as geometer moths and owlet moths, as well as beetle larvae, fly larvae, caddisfly larvae and aphids. Other food items include spiders, and some seeds are also taken. The young are largely fed on moth larvae, with caterpillars of the cabbage moth and crane fly larvae having been identified.

== Status ==
The Eurasian wren is classified as "Least Concern" on the IUCN Red List due to its extremely large range, increasing population trend, and a globally substantial population size.

The breeding population in Europe is estimated to range from 32.7 to 56.5 million pairs, equating to 65.3 to 113 million mature individuals.

== Relationship with humans ==
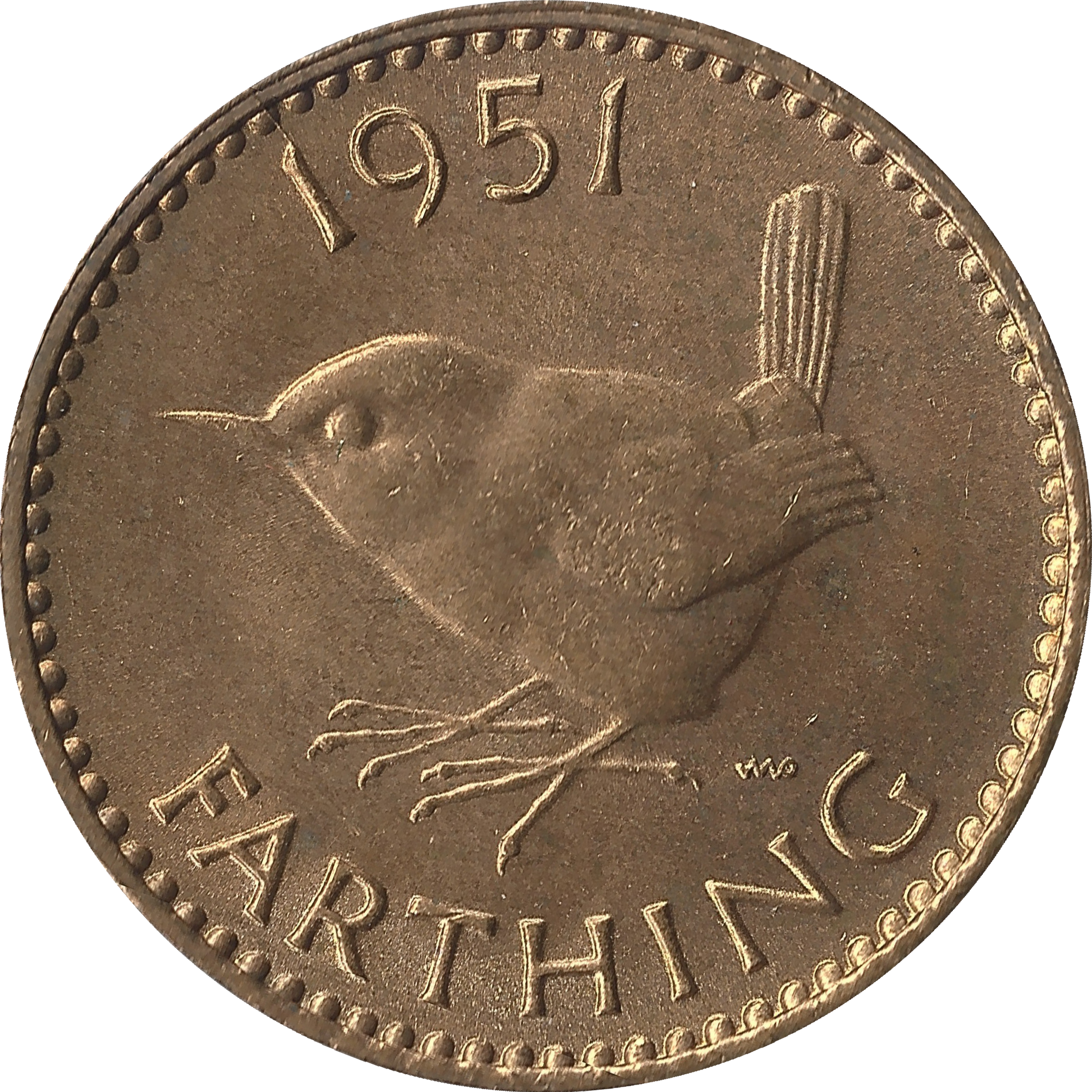
Wren on a British farthing coin

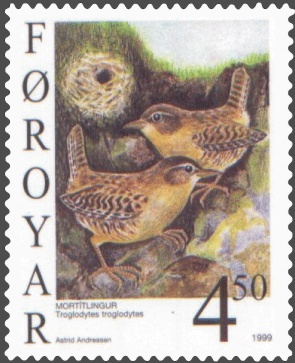
Wrens on a stamp from the Faroe Islands

In European folklore, the wren is the king of the birds, (Note: Historically, the name "wren" was used for several unrelated but very small birds, notably "Golden-crested Wren" or "Golden-crowned Wren" (now goldcrest), "Willow Wren" (now willow warbler) and "Wood Wren" (now wood warbler); these legends may have developed from these species, rather than Eurasian wren, particularly so the goldcrest with its even smaller size and its golden crown signifying kingship. See Goldcrest#In culture for additional detail and citations.) according to a fable attributed to Aesop by Plutarch, when the eagle and the wren strove to fly the highest, the wren rested on the eagle's back, and when the eagle tired, the wren flew out above him. Thus, Plutarch implied, the wren proved that cleverness is better than strength. The wren's majesty is recognized in such stories as the Grimm Brothers' The Willow-Wren and the Bear. Aristotle and Plutarch called the wren basileus (king) and basiliskos (little king). In German, the wren is called Zaunkönig (king of the fence). An old German name was "Schneekönig" (snow king), and in Dutch, it is "winterkoning" (winter king), which all refer to king. In Japan, the wren is labelled king of the winds, and the myth of The Wren Among the Hawks sees the wren successfully hunt a boar that the hawks could not, by flying into its ear and driving it mad.

It was a sacred bird to the Druids, who considered it "king of all birds", and used its musical notes for divination. The shape-shifting Fairy Queen took the form of a wren, known as "Jenny Wren" in nursery rhymes. A wren's feather was thought to be a charm against disaster or drowning.

The wren also features in the legend of Saint Stephen, the first Christian martyr, who supposedly was betrayed by the noisy bird as he attempted to hide from his enemies. Traditionally, Saint Stephen's Day (26 December) has been commemorated by Hunting the Wren, where young wren-boys would catch the bird and then ritually parade it around town, as described in the traditional "Wren Song". The Wren, the Wren, the king of all birds, Saint Stephen's day was caught in the furze. Although he is little, his family's great, I pray you, good landlady, give us a treat. The tradition, and the significance of the wren as a symbol and sacrifice of the old year, is discussed in Sir James Frazer's The Golden Bough.

According to Suetonius, the assassination of Julius Caesar was foretold by an unfortunate wren. On the day before the Ides of March, a wren was seen being pursued in a frenzy by various other birds. With a conspicuous sprig of laurel clamped in its beak, the wren flew desperately into the Roman Senate, but there its pursuers overtook it and tore it to pieces.

=== Cultural depictions ===
- The old British farthing coin featured a wren on the reverse side from 1937 to 1960. The wren was chosen because it was thought of as Britain's smallest bird.
- Wrens have been featured on postage stamps from Albania, Alderney, Belarus, Belgium, Bulgaria, the Faroe Islands, France, Germany, Britain, Guernsey, Hungary, Iceland, Ireland, the Isle of Man, Jersey, the Netherlands, San Marino, the United States, (Note: The 1999 U.S. stamp features a "winter wren (Troglodytes troglodytes)" of the Pacific Coast Rain Forest; this bird was subsequently classified as the Pacific wren (Nannus pacificus).) and Vatican City.

== Sources ==
- Cramp, Stanley; et al., eds. (1988). "Troglodytes troglodytes Wren". Handbook of the Birds of Europe the Middle East and North Africa. The Birds of the Western Palearctic. Vol. V: Tyrant Flycatchers to Thrushes. Oxford: Oxford University Press. pp. 525–542. ISBN 978-0-19-857508-5.
