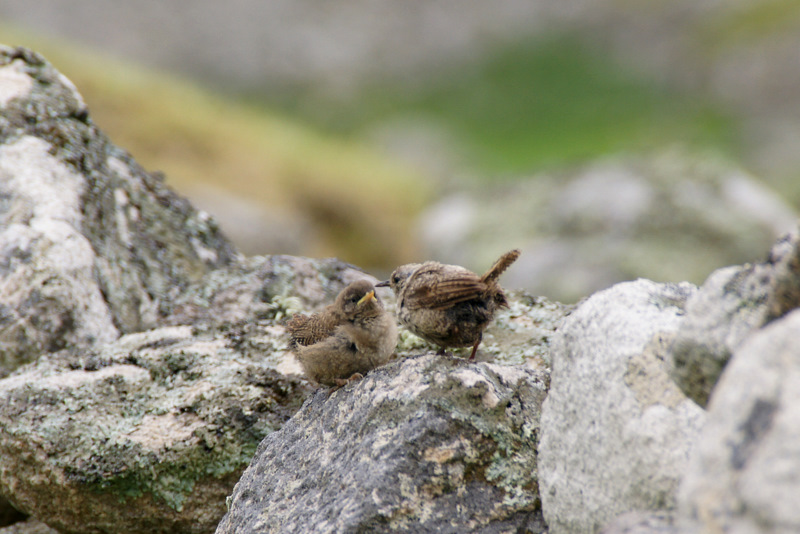
- St Kilda wren in Village Bay, St Kilda

Scientific classification
- Kingdom: Animalia
- Phylum: Chordata
- Class: Aves
- Order: Passeriformes
- Family: Troglodytidae
- Genus: Nannus
- Species: N. troglodytes
- Subspecies: N. t. hirtensis

Trinomial name
- Nannus troglodytes hirtensis Seebohm, 1884

= St Kilda wren =

Subspecies of bird

The St Kilda wren (Nannus troglodytes hirtensis) is a small passerine bird in the wren family. It is a distinctive subspecies of the Eurasian wren, endemic to the islands of the isolated St Kilda archipelago, in the Atlantic Ocean 64 kilometres (40 mi) west of the Outer Hebrides, Scotland.

== Description ==
The St Kilda wren is distinguished from the mainland form by its larger size and heavier barring, as well as its generally greyer and less rufous colouration. It differs from other Scottish island subspecies by its heavy barring, long and strong bill, and its greyer and paler plumage. The voice is somewhat louder than the mainland subspecies.

== Distribution and habitat ==
This wren is known only from St Kilda in the Outer Hebrides, where it is present on all islands in the group. In the breeding season it is largely found on the cliffs and steep rocky slopes with thick vegetation, but also around old buildings. Outside the breeding season it is more widely dispersed around the islands.

== Ecology ==
The St Kilda wren feeds on small invertebrates such as beetles and their larvae, flies, moth larvae, spiders, centipedes and sandhoppers. Most birds breed in crevices and holes on cliffs concealed behind grasses and dead thrift. Some choose old walls and buildings, or the steep grassy slopes where puffins breed. The nest is built by the male and is rather bulky and is composed of dead grasses, mosses and bits of dead bracken, lined with white feathers moulted by seabirds. There are usually four to six eggs, white with reddish-brown speckles, mostly on the wide end.

== Status ==
The St Kilda wren is a fairly common breeding resident on St Kilda. The population was estimated at 230 breeding pairs in 2002.
