= UK Research Integrity Office =

British charitable organization

The UK Research Integrity Office (UKRIO), established in 2006 is an independent body in the United Kingdom "which provides expert advice and guidance about the conduct of research". The UKRIO is a registered charity.
