= Kenneth Williamson =

- Kenneth Williamson
- Born: 1914; Bury, Greater Manchester
- Died: 14 June 1977
- Occupation: Ornithologist

Kenneth Williamson FRSE MBOU (c. 1914 – 14 June 1977) was a British ornithologist who had a strong association with Scotland and with bird migration.

== Life ==
Williamson was born in Bury, Lancashire. After briefly working as a journalist, Williamson started training in biology at the Manx Museum. He served with the British occupation of the Faroe Islands in World War II from 1941 to 1945. After the war he continued his biological training at the Yorkshire Museum under Reginald Wagstaffe. He was employed as a Museum Assistant for Natural History from 1946 until April 1949 when he left to become the Director of the Fair Isle Bird Observatory. He remained in the role of director until 1957 when he left to be the inaugural Migration Research Officer for the British Trust for Ornithology.

He served as editor of the journal Bird Migration (1958–1963). He served on the British Birds Rarities Committee (1959–1963).

On 2 March 1959 Williamson was elected a Fellow of the Royal Society of Edinburgh. His proposers were George Waterston, Vero Wynne-Edwards, John Berry and James Ritchie.

He died unexpectedly during the night of 14 June 1977.

=== Personal life ===
He married Esther Louise Rein of Tórshavn in 1944, with whom he had a daughter and a son.

== Publications ==
As well as numerous ornithological papers, books authored or co-authored by Williamson include:

- 1937 – The Sky’s Their Highway. Putnam: London. (Illustrated by Charles Tunnicliffe)
- 1948 – The Atlantic Islands. A Study of the Faeroe Life and Scene. Collins: London.
- 1960 – St Kilda Summer. Hutchinson: London. (With J. Morton Boyd).
- 1963 – A Mosaic of Islands. Oliver & Boyd: London. (With J. Morton Boyd).
- 1965 – Fair Isle and its Birds. Oliver & Boyd: London.
