= Nannus =

- Eurasian Wren (Nannus troglodytes)

Scientific classification
- Kingdom: Animalia
- Phylum: Chordata
- Class: Aves
- Order: Passeriformes
- Family: Troglodytidae
- Genus: Nannus; Billberg, 1828

Type species
- Motacilla troglodytes Linnaeus, 1758

Species
- See text

Genus of birds

Nannus is a genus of passerine birds in the wren family. Of the three species in this genus, two occur in North America, while the third (the only member of the wren family native to the Old World) is distributed across Eurasia and North Africa. All species in the genus were formerly placed in the genus Troglodytes.

== Etymology ==
The genus Nannus was described in 1828 by the Swedish scientist Gustaf Johan Billberg. The genus name is derived from the Ancient Greek word ναννος (nannos), meaning "dwarf".

== Description ==
Oberholser (1919) distinguished Nannus from Troglodytes by its relatively short tail, measuring less than three-quarters of the wing length; its slender, flattened bill with a nearly straight culmen; and its narrow, slit-like nostrils, largely covered by thin, overhanging membranes.

== Systematics ==
In the early 20th century, Nannus was often recognized as a genus distinct from Troglodytes. However, Hellmayr (1934) considered the morphological differences between the two genera insufficient to justify their separation, pointing in particular to the existence of species with intermediate characteristics. He therefore merged Nannus into Troglodytes, a treatment that subsequently became widely adopted.

Later, Rice et al. (1999) found that Troglodytes, as then broadly defined, was paraphyletic, with the species traditionally placed in Nannus distantly related to the remaining members of Troglodytes. They consequently proposed reinstating Nannus as a distinct genus. Subsequent molecular phylogenetic studies by Barker (2017) and Imfeld et al. (2024) provided further support for this separation, with the latter recovering Nannus as the sister group to Cistothorus. The genus was recognized by the American Ornithological Society and AviList in 2026.

The phylogenetic tree below is from Imfeld et al. (2024).

- Nannus
  - Winter wren − Nannus hiemalis
  - - Pacific wren − Nannus pacificus
    - Eurasian wren − Nannus troglodytes

=== Species ===
The genus contains 3 species:

| Image | Common name | Scientific name | Distribution |
|---|---|---|---|
| | Winter wren | Nannus hiemalis | breeds from northeastern British Columbia eastward to Newfoundland (northwestern to northeastern Canada), southward to Wisconsin to southern Ontario, and in the Appalachians to far northeastern Georgia; winters in the southern half of the eastern USA to northeastern Texas, the Gulf coast, and northern Florida |
| | Pacific wren | Nannus pacificus | From southern and western Alaska, including the Aleutian and Pribilof Islands, southward to southwestern Alberta (southwestern Canada) in northern Rocky Mountains to southern Idaho and western Montana, and the USA along the Pacific coast and ranges to central California, with an isolated population in central Arizona and possibly in western South Dakota (Black Hills) |
| | Eurasian wren | Nannus troglodytes | From Iceland, North Atlantic islands, and British Isles eastward to Kamchatka and Japan, and southward to northern Africa, Levant, Caucasus, Himalayas, southern China, and Taiwan |
