= List of airports by ICAO code: EB-EG =

List of airports by ICAO code: A - B - C - D - EB-EG - EH-EY - FA-FM - FN-FZ - G - H - ~~I~~ - J - KA-KH - KI-KP - KR-KZ - LA-LJ - LK-LZ - M - N - O - P - Q - R - SA-SC - SD-SH - SI - SJ - SK-SM - SN-SP - SQ - SS-SU - SV-SY - T - U - V - W - ~~X~~ - Y - Z

== EB – Belgium ==
Also see airport category and list.

All Belgian airports from Aeronautical Information Publication at Belgocontrol except where noted.

=== EB – Public airports ===
ICAO	IATA	Airport name	Community	Province or territory	Coordinates	Notes
EBAW	ANR	Antwerp International Airport	Antwerp/Deurne	Antwerp	51°11′22″N 4°27′37″E	
EBBR	BRU	Brussels Airport	Brussels/Zaventem	Flemish Brabant	50°54′05″N 4°29′04″E	
EBCI	CRL	Brussels South Charleroi Airport	Charleroi	Heynault	50°27′36″N 4°27′10″E	
EBKT	KJK	Kortrijk-Wevelgem International Airport	Kortrijk/Wevelgem	West Flanders	50°49′07″N 3°12′23″E	
EBLG	LGG	Liège Airport	Liège	Liège	50°38′11″N 5°26′34″E	
EBOS	OST	Ostend–Bruges International Airport	Bruges/Ostend	West Flanders	51°11′56″N 2°51′44″E	

=== EB – Military air bases ===
ICAO	IATA	Airport name	Community	Province or territory	Coordinates	Notes
EBBE		Beauvechain Air Base	Beauvechain		50°45′28″N 4°46′01″E	
EBBL		Kleine Brogel Air Base	Kleine Brogel		51°10′06″N 5°28′12″E	
EBBX		Jehonville Air Base	Bertrix		49°53′30″N 5°13′26″E	
EBCV		Chièvres Air Base	Chièvres		50°34′33″N 3°49′52″E	
EBDT		Schaffen Air Base	Schaffen		51°00′07″N 5°03′52″E	
EBFN		Koksijde Air Base	Koksijde		51°05′25″N 2°39′10″E	
EBFS		Florennes Air Base	Florennes		50°14′36″N 4°38′45″E	
EBLB		Elsenborn-Butgenbach Air Base	Elsenborn		50°29′05″N 6°10′59″E	
EBMB	BRU	Melsbroek Air Base	Brussels/Zaventem		50°54′05″N 4°29′04″E	
EBSU		Saint-Hubert Air Base	Saint-Hubert		50°02′03″N 5°26′24″E	
EBUL		Ursel Air Base	Ursel		51°08′39″N 3°28′32″E	
EBWE		Weelde Air Base	Weelde		51°23′39″N 4°57′33″E	

=== EB – Private airfields ===
ICAO	IATA	Airport name	Community	Province or territory	Coordinates	Notes
EBBT		Brasschaat Airfield	Brasschaat		51°20′27″N 4°30′15″E	
EBCF		Cerfontaine Airfield	Cerfontaine		50°09′10″N 4°23′14″E	
EBGB		Grimbergen Airfield	Grimbergen		50°56′55″N 4°23′31″E	
EBGG		Overboelare Airfield	Geraardsbergen/Overboelare		50°45′20″N 3°51′50″E	
EBHN		Hoevenen Airfield	Hoevenen		51°18′19″N 4°23′26″E	
EBKH		Balen-Keiheuvel Aerodrome	Balen		51°10′51″N 5°13′15″E	
EBLE		Leopoldsburg/Beverlo Airfield	Leopoldsburg/Beverlo		51°07′12″N 5°18′26″E	
EBMO		Moorsele Airfield	Moorsele		50°51′10″N 3°08′50″E	
EBNM		Namur-Suarlée Airfield	Namur		50°29′17″N 4°46′08″E	
EBSG		Saint-Ghislain Airfield	Saint-Ghislain		50°27′27″N 3°49′13″E	
EBSH		Saint-Hubert Airfield	Saint-Hubert		50°02′09″N 5°24′15″E	
EBSL		Zutendaal Air Base	Zutendaal		50°56′51″N 5°35′26″E	
EBSP		Spa-La Sauvenière Airfield	Spa		50°28′57″N 5°54′37″E	
EBST		Sint-Truiden / Brustem Airfield	Brustem/Sint-Truiden		50°47′31″N 5°12′06″E	
EBTN		Goetsenhoven Airfield	Goetsenhoven		50°46′54″N 4°57′28″E	
EBTX		Verviers-Theux Airfield	Theux		50°33′09″N 5°51′18″E	
EBTY		Maubray Airfield	Tournai		50°31′47″N 3°29′40″E	
EBZH		Kiewit Airfield	Hasselt		50°58′12″N 5°22′30″E	
EBZR		Oostmalle Airfield	Zoersel/Oostmalle		51°15′53″N 4°45′12″E	
EBZW		Zwartberg Airfield	Genk		51°00′55″N 5°31′35″E	

=== EB – ULM fields ===
ICAO	IATA	Airport name	Community	Province or territory	Coordinates	Notes
EBAM		Amougies Airfield	Amougies		50°44′22″N 3°29′10″E	
EBAR		Arlon-Sterpenich Aerodrome	Arlon		49°39′46″N 5°53′13″E	
EBAV		Avernas-le-Bauduin Airfield	Hannut		50°42′24″N 5°04′05″E	
EBBN		Büllingen Airfield	Büllingen		50°24′54″N 6°16′35″E	
EBBY		Baisy-Thy Airfield	Genappe		50°34′07″N 4°26′05″E	
EBBZ		Buzet Airfield	Pont-à-Celles		50°32′30″N 4°22′52″E	
EBIS		Ath/Isières Airfield	Ath		50°39′51″N 3°48′16″E	
~~EBLN~~		~~Liernu Airfield~~	Éghezée		50°34′47″N 4°47′32″E	
EBMG		Doische-Matagne Airfield	Doische		50°06′17″N 4°38′17″E	
EBML		Maillen Airfield	Assesse		50°22′27″N 4°55′40″E	
~~EBNE~~		~~Neerpelt Airfield~~	Neerpelt		51°12′43″N 5°28′43″E	
EBOR		Orchimont Airfield	Vresse-sur-Semois		49°54′23″N 4°56′03″E	
EBZU		Zuienkerke Airfield	Zuienkerke		51°15′24″N 3°08′26″E	

=== EB – Hospital heliports ===
ICAO	IATA	Airport name	Community	Province or territory	Coordinates	Notes
EBAD		Roeselare/AZ Delta Heliport	Roeselare		50°55′02″N 3°09′55″E	
EBAL		Aalst Hospital Heliport	Aalst		50°56′35″N 4°03′21″E	
EBBA		Baudour Heliport	Douvrain		50°28′10″N 3°50′20″E	
EBCH		Liège/Clinique Montlegia CHC Heliport	Liège		50°38′54″N 5°32′03″E	
EBEA		Eeklo/AZ Alma Heliport	Eeklo		51°11′28″N 3°32′04″E	
EBEU		Universitair Ziekenhuis Antwerpen Hospital Heliport	Edegem		51°09′21″N 4°24′35″E	
EBGA		UZ Leuven Hospital Heliport	Leuven		50°52′38″N 4°40′22″E	
EBGH		Grand Hôpital de Charleroi (GHDC Asbl) Heliport	Loverval		50°25′15″N 4°29′24″E	
EBGT		Ghent/Industry Zone Heliport	Ghent		51°01′14″N 3°43′49″E	
EBKG		AZ Groeninge Heliport	Kortrijk		50°48′10″N 3°15′50″E	
EBKZ		Knokke/AZ Zeno Heliport	Knokke		51°19′43″N 3°17′33″E	
EBLC		CHR de La Citadelle Hospital Heliport	Liège		50°39′12″N 5°34′40″E	
EBLS		Liège/Centre Hospitalier Heliport	Liège		50°34′17″N 5°33′55″E	
EBLX		Lierneux/Centre Hospitalier Spécial l'Accueil Heliport	Lierneux		50°17′13″N 5°47′20″E	
EBMD		Antwerp/Middelheim Hospital Heliport	Antwerp		51°10′54″N 4°25′16″E	
EBMS		Centre Médical Héliporté ASBL (CMH) Heliport	Lierneux		50°19′18″N 5°43′51″E	
EBMT		Centre Hospitalier Universitaire A. Vésale Heliport	Montigny-le-Tilleul		50°21′31″N 4°22′07″E	
EBNB		Clinique Saint-Luc Bouge Heliport	Namur		50°28′44″N 4°53′06″E	
EBNG		Namur/CHU UCL Godinne Heliport	Namur		50°21′31″N 4°53′04″E	
EBSJ		Bruges/Sint-Pieters Hospital Heliport	Sint-Pieters		51°13′14″N 3°11′46″E	
EBSS		Sint-Lucas Hospital Heliport	Bruges		51°11′03″N 3°15′00″E	
EBUC		Cliniques Universitaires Saint-Luc Hospital Heliport	Woluwe-Saint-Lambert		50°11′01″N 4°27′13″E	
EBVS		Veurne/Sint-Augustinus Heliport	Veurne		51°03′44″N 2°40′10″E	
EBYP		Regionaal Ziekenhuis Jan Yperman VZW Hospital Heliport	Ypres		50°51′49″N 2°53′48″E	

=== EB – Private heliports ===
ICAO	IATA	Airport name	Community	Province or territory	Coordinates	Notes
EBAF		Affligem Heliport	Affligem		50°54′12″N 4°05′31″E	
EBAG		Grace-Hollogne/Agusta Aerospace Services Heliport	Grace-Hollogne		50°38′24″N 5°27′27″E	
EBAS		Schilde/'s-Gravenwezel Heliport	Schilde		51°14′49″N 4°32′34″E	
EBBC		Brecht/Luyckx Heliport	Brecht		51°13′26″N 4°12′51″E	
EBBG		Kortrijk/Bellegem	Kortrijk		50°45′45″N 3°17′26″E	
EBBM		Brakel/Michelbeke Heliport	Michelbeke		50°49′51″N 3°46′27″E	
EBBV		Brecht/Vochten Heliport	Brecht		51°19′55″N 4°37′28″E	
EBCM		Merchtem/Stephex Heliport	Merchtem		50°56′41″N 4°14′40″E	
EBCT		Shape Pad Heliport	Casteau		50°30′03″N 3°58′53″E	
EBDV		Diksmuide/Leke Heliport	Diksmuide		51°05′41″N 2°55′29″E	
EBDY		Nivelle/Dynali Heliport	Nivelle		50°34′31″N 4°21′29″E	
EBDZ		Deinze/De Groote Heliport	Deinze		50°57′50″N 3°32′34″E	
EBEB		Evergem/Belzele Heliport	Evergem		51°06′03″N 3°39′13″E	
EBEM		Sint-Joris-Winge Heliport	Sint-Joris-Winge		50°54′22″N 4°51′54″E	
EBEN		Ranst/Engles Heliport	Ranst		51°12′42″N 4°34′51″E	
EBFI		Knokke/Fort Isabella Heliport	Knokke		51°19′58″N 3°21′52″E	
EBFR		Francorchamps Heliport	Francorchamps		50°27′22″N 5°57′14″E	
EBGJ		Engis Heliport	Engis		50°32′49″N 5°25′10″E	
EBGU		Nevele Heliportt	Nevele		51°02′48″N 3°31′13″E	
EBHC		Kruisem/Hof Van Cleve Heliport	Kruisem		50°54′13″N 3°30′33″E	
EBHF		Kallo/De Perel Heliport	Kallo		51°16′08″N 4°17′45″E	
EBHH		Hulshout Heliport	Hulshout		51°03′13″N 4°47′45″E	
EBHM		Hasselt/Maasland Heliport	Hasselt		50°54′35″N 5°20′56″E	
EBHO		Holsbeek Heliport	Holsbeek		50°55′12″N 4°46′08″E	
EBHS		Hasselt/Stevoort Heliport	Hasselt		50°55′30″N 5°14′03″E	
EBHT		Houthalen Heliport	Houthalen-Helchteren		51°00′51″N 5°21′33″E	
EBJS		Ath/Ghislenghien Heliport	Ath		50°40′00″N 3°52′13″E	
EBKD		Holsbeek/Kortrijk-Dutsei Heliport	Holsbeek		50°54′13″N 4°48′22″E	
EBKL		Kruisem/Wijkhuizenstraat Heliport	Kruisem		50°55′44″N 3°33′15″E	
EBKR		Kruishoutem/Sons Heliport	Kruishoutem		50°53′30″N 3°30′03″E	
EBKW		Knokke-Heist/Westkapelle Heliport	Knokke-Heist		51°19′18″N 3°17′40″E	
EBLC		Liège/Citadelle Heliport	Liège		50°39′12″N 5°34′40″E	
EBLD		Ranst/De Vijver Heliport	Ranst		51°13′02″N 4°33′28″E	
EBLH		Lotenhulle Heliport	Aalter		51°02′00″N 3°29′48″E	
EBLJ		Lokeren/Janssens Heliport	Lokeren		51°05′44″N 3°55′06″E	
EBLM		Meulebeke Heliport	Meulebeke		50°55′54″N 3°17′38″E	
EBLO		Lochristi Heliport	Lochristi		51°05′03″N 3°50′19″E	
EBLR		Waasmunster/Raemdonck Heliport	Waasmunster		51°06′51″N 4°02′16″E	
EBLS		Liège/Sart Tilman Heliport	Liège		50°34′17″N 5°33′55″E	
EBLT		Lint Heliport	Lint		51°08′11″N 4°28′44″E	
EBLU		Lummen Heliport	Lummen		50°59′31″N 5°14′20″E	
EBLV		Kortemark Heliport	Kortemark		51°00′28″N 3°02′42″E	
EBLY		Ranst/Lymar Heliport	Ranst		51°12′38″N 4°34′36″E	
EBMA		Sint-Eloois-Winkel/Monte Marcella Heliport	Sint-Eloois-Winkel		50°51′43″N 3°10′35″E	
EBMC		Lodelinsart/Marie-Curie Heliport	Lodelinsart		50°25′49″N 4°26′18″E	
EBME		Meerbeek Heliport	Meerbeek		50°52′26″N 4°35′49″E	
EBMH		Maldegem/Huysman Heliport	Maldegem		51°13′10″N 3°24′08″E	
EBMK		Maarkedal/Nukerke Heliport	Maarkedal		50°46′55″N 3°37′11″E	
EBMM		Maasmechelen Heliport	Maasmechelen		50°57′14″N 5°42′17″E	
EBMN		Meetkerke/Nachtegaele Heliport	Zuienkerke		51°14′39″N 3°10′16″E	
EBMS		Lierneux/Bra Heliport	Lierneux		50°19′18″N 5°43′51″E	
EBMT		Montigny-le-Tilleul Heliport	Montigny-le-Tilleul		50°21′31″N 4°22′07″E	
EBNB		Namur/Bouge Heliport	Namur		50°28′44″N 4°53′06″E	
EBNH		Oostende Heliport	Ostend		51°11′40″N 2°51′17″E	
EBNK		Nokere/Suys Heliport	Nokere		50°52′46″N 3°31′12″E	
EBNP		Neerpelt/Tilburgs Heliport	Neerpelt		51°14′24″N 5°25′04″E	
EBNR		Roeselare/Nuytten Heliport	Roeselare		50°54′39″N 3°06′13″E	
EBOB		Oud-Heverlee/Blanden Heliport	Oud-Heverlee		50°49′21″N 4°42′32″E	
EBOK		Brussels/Groot-Bijgaarden Heliport	Brussels		50°52′10″N 4°16′50″E	
EBOO		Oostdijckbank Heliport	Offshore		51°16′28″N 2°26′51″E	
EBPC		Tessenderlo Heliport	Tessenderlo		51°04′28″N 5°07′16″E	
EBPL		Gesves Heliport	Gesves		50°25′46″N 5°04′10″E	
EBPP		Deinze/Piens Heliport	Deinze		50°59′42″N 3°31′44″E	
EBPW		Pecq/Warcoing Heliport	Pecq		50°43′20″N 3°19′34″E	
EBRD		Roosdaal Heliport	Roosdaal		50°49′32″N 4°05′49″E	
EBRE		Lo-Reninge Heliport	Lo-Reninge		50°56′04″N 2°45′33″E	
EBRL		Kampenhout Heliport	Kampenhout		50°56′40″N 4°32′40″E	
EBRO		Ranst/Van Den Bosch Heliport	Ranst		51°12′35″N 4°35′15″E	
EBRU		Bekkevoort Heliport	Bekkevoort		50°57′27″N 5°00′55″E	
EBSA		Koningshooikt Heliport	Koningshooikt		51°04′59″N 4°34′42″E	
EBSB		Spiere-Helkijn Heliport	Spiere-Helkijn		50°43′40″N 3°21′12″E	
EBSF		Spa/Francorchamps Heliport	Spa		50°25′48″N 5°57′31″E	
EBSV		Ottergem/Erpe-Mere Heliport	Ottergem		50°55′58″N 3°57′04″E	
EBSW		Sint-Pieters-Leeuw Heliport	Sint-Pieters-Leeuw		50°45′52″N 4°13′13″E	
EBTB		Roeselare/Boury Heliport	Roeselare		50°57′58″N 3°09′18″E	
EBTK		Tielen/Kasterlee Heliport	Kasterlee		51°17′01″N 4°54′44″E	
EBTM		Moerkerke/Den Hoorn Heliport	Moerkerke		51°14′43″N 3°22′14″E	
EBTW		Kieldrecht/De Kreek	Kieldrecht		51°16′35″N 4°10′50″E	
EBVE		Oeren Heliport	Veurne		51°01′20″N 2°40′48″E	
EBVN		Vlimmeren Heliport	Vlimmeren		51°18′23″N 4°48′24″E	
EBVU		Rotselaar Heliport	Rotselaar		50°56′21″N 4°43′50″E	
EBWA		Waasmunster Heliport	Waasmunster		51°07′22″N 4°07′40″E	
EBWH		Wingene/Hemelrijk Heliport	Wingene		51°05′22″N 3°15′49″E	
EBWK		Wervik Heliport	Wervik		50°46′17″N 3°01′41″E	
EBWP		Wortegem-Petegem Heliport	Wortegem-Petegem		50°52′44″N 3°32′05″E	
EBWS		Wingene/Scherrens Heliport	Wingene		51°04′32″N 3°17′56″E	
EBWV		Ichtegem Heliport	Ichtegem		51°03′43″N 3°01′50″E	
EBWZ		Wingene/Zwevezele Heliport	Wingene		51°03′07″N 3°14′20″E	
EBYC		Grembergen/Dendermonde Heliport	Grembergen		51°03′28″N 4°05′51″E	
EBZA		Zedelgem/Aartrijke	Zedelgem		51°07′36″N 3°04′16″E	
EBZE		Zele Heliport	Zele		51°02′52″N 4°01′08″E	
EBZM		Zomergem Heliport	Zomergem		51°07′53″N 3°31′20″E	
EBZO		Zonnebeke/Zandvoorde Heliport	Zandvoorde		50°49′02″N 2°58′28″E	

== ED/ET – Germany ==
Also see airport category and list.

=== ED – Civilian airports ===
ICAO	IATA	Airport name	Community	State	Coordinates	Notes
EDAB		Bautzen Airport	Bautzen		51°11′37″N 14°31′11″E	
EDAC	AOC	Leipzig-Altenburg Airport	Altenburg/Leipzig		50°58′50″N 12°30′36″E	
EDAD		Flugplatz Dessau	Dessau		51°49′54″N 12°11′02″E	
EDAE		Eisenhuettenstadt Airport	Eisenhüttenstadt		52°11′50″N 14°35′09″E	
EDAG		Grossrueckerswalde Airport	Grossrueckerswalde		50°38′39″N 13°07′35″E	
EDAH		Heringsdorf Airport (Flugplatz Heringsdorf)	Heringsdorf		53°52′43″N 14°09′08″E	
EDAJ		Gera–Leumnitz Airport	Gera		50°52′54″N 12°08′09″E	
EDAK		Grossenhain Airport	Grossenhain		51°18′29″N 13°33′20″E	
EDAM		Merseburg Airport	Merseburg		51°21′45″N 11°56′28″E	
EDAN		Neustadt–Glewe	Neustadt-Glewe		53°21′45″N 11°36′50″E	
EDAO		Nordhausen Airport	Nordhausen		51°29′37″N 10°50′15″E	
EDAP		Cottbus-Neuhausen Airport	Cottbus		51°41′02″N 14°25′26″E	
EDAQ		Halle–Oppin Airport	Oppin		51°33′08″N 12°03′14″E	
EDAR		Pirna–Pratzschwitz Airport	Pirna		50°58′47″N 13°54′30″E	
EDAS		Finsterwalde–Heinrichsruh Airport	Finsterwalde		51°38′05″N 13°40′30″E	
EDAT		Nardt Airport	Hoyerswerda		51°27′04″N 14°11′58″E	
EDAU		Riesa–Goehlis Airport	Riesa		51°17′37″N 13°21′22″E	
EDAV		Flugplatz Finow	Finow		52°49′35″N 13°42′05″E	
EDAW		Roitzschjora Airport	Löbnitz		51°34′40″N 12°29′40″E	
EDAX		Müritz Airpark	Rechlin		53°18′23″N 12°45′11″E	
EDAY		Flugplatz Strausberg	Strausberg	Brandenburg	52°34′50″N 13°55′00″E	
EDAZ		Schönhagen Airport	Trebbin	Brandenburg	52°12′14″N 13°09′36″E	
EDBA		Arnstadt–Alkersleben Airport	Arnstadt		50°50′31″N 11°04′12″E	
EDBC	CSO	Magdeburg–Cochstedt Airport	Magdeburg		51°51′21″N 11°25′06″E	
EDBE		Brandenburg–Muehlenfeld Airport	Brandenburg an der Havel		52°26′15″N 12°35′24″E	
EDBF		Fehrbellin Airport	Fehrbellin		52°47′37″N 12°45′37″E	
~~EDBG~~	~~GWW~~	~~Gatow Airfield~~	Berlin-Gatow		52°28′28″N 13°08′17″E	closed for public traffic in 1994
EDBH	BBH	Stralsund-Barth Airport	Barth	Mecklenburg-Vorpommern	54°20′17″N 12°43′36″E	
EDBI		Zwickau Airport	Zwickau		50°42′06″N 12°27′14″E	
EDBJ		Jena–Schöngleina Airport	Schöngleina		50°54′55″N 11°42′51″E	
EDBK		Kyritz Airport	Kyritz		52°55′08″N 12°25′31″E	
EDBL		Laucha Airport	Laucha an der Unstrut		51°14′45″N 11°41′36″E	
EDBM	ZMG	Magdeburg City Airport	Magdeburg		52°04′25″N 11°37′35″E	
EDBN	FNB	Neubrandenburg Airport	Neubrandenburg		53°36′08″N 13°18′22″E	
EDBO		Oehna Airport	Zellendorf		51°53′59″N 13°03′10″E	
EDBP		Pinnow Airport	Pinnow	Mecklenburg-Vorpommern	53°36′55″N 11°33′40″E	
EDBQ		Bronkow Airport	Bronkow		51°40′20″N 13°57′36″E	
EDBR		Rothenburg/Goerlitz Airport	Rothenburg		51°21′48″N 14°57′00″E	
EDBS		Sömmerda-Dermsdorf Airport	Sömmerda		51°11′53″N 11°11′47″E	
EDBT		Allstedt Airport	Allstedt		51°22′50″N 11°26′48″E	
EDBU		Pritzwalk–Sommersberg Airport	Pritzwalk		53°10′48″N 12°11′04″E	
EDBV		Stralsund Airport	Stralsund		54°20′09″N 13°02′36″E	
EDBW		Werneuchen Airport	Werneuchen		52°37′54″N 13°46′01″E	
EDBX		Goerlitz Airport	Goerlitz		51°09′32″N 14°57′01″E	
EDBY		Schmoldow Airport	Züssow		53°58′22″N 13°20′36″E	
EDBZ		Schwarzheide/Schipkau Airport	Schwarzheide		51°29′31″N 13°52′46″E	
EDCA		Anklam Airport	Anklam		53°49′58″N 13°40′07″E	
EDCB		Ballenstedt Airport	Ballenstedt		51°44′45″N 11°13′47″E	
~~EDCD~~	~~CBU~~	~~Cottbus-Drewitz Airport~~	Cottbus		51°53′22″N 14°31′55″E	closed in 2020
EDCE		Eggersdorf Airport	Eggersdorf		52°28′58″N 14°05′27″E	
EDCG		Rügen Airport (Bergen Airfield/Güttin Airfield)	Rügen		54°23′03″N 13°19′54″E	
EDCH		Sprossen Airport	Zeitz		51°02′36″N 12°13′55″E	
EDCI		Klix Airfield	Bautzen		51°16′42″N 14°30′39″E	
EDCJ		Chemnitz/Jahnsdorf Airport	Chemnitz		50°44′51″N 12°50′15″E	
EDCL		Klietz/Scharlibbe Airport	Klietz		52°42′34″N 12°04′24″E	
EDCM		Kamenz Airport	Kamenz		51°17′49″N 14°07′39″E	
EDCO		Obermehler–Schlotheim Airport	Obermehler		51°16′04″N 10°38′05″E	
EDCP		Peenemünde Airfield	Peenemünde		54°09′28″N 13°46′22″E	
EDCQ		Aschersleben Airport	Aschersleben		51°46′01″N 11°29′54″E	
EDCR		Rerik–Zweedorf Airport	Rerik		54°04′55″N 11°38′57″E	
EDCS		Saarmund Airport	Saarmund		52°18′30″N 13°06′02″E	
EDCT		Taucha Airport	Taucha		51°23′42″N 12°32′13″E	
EDCU		Guestrow Airport	Guestrow		53°48′19″N 12°13′50″E	
EDCV		Pasewalk Airport	Pasewalk		53°30′19″N 13°56′54″E	
EDCW		Wismar Airport	Wismar		53°54′52″N 11°29′58″E	
EDCX		Purkshof Airport	Rövershagen		54°09′42″N 12°14′55″E	
EDCY		Welzow Airport	Welzow		51°34′32″N 14°08′13″E	
EDDB	BER	Berlin Brandenburg Airport	Berlin		52°22′00″N 13°30′12″E	prior to opening in 2020, its code was designated for Berlin Schönefeld Airport with IATA airport code ~~SXF~~
EDDC	DRS	Dresden Airport (Dresden-Klotzsche Airport)	Dresden		51°08′04″N 13°46′05″E	
EDDE	ERF	Erfurt–Weimar Airport	Erfurt		50°58′47″N 10°57′29″E	
EDDF	FRA	Frankfurt Airport	Frankfurt am Main		50°02′00″N 8°34′14″E	
EDDG	FMO	Münster Osnabrück Airport	Greven		52°08′10″N 7°41′09″E	
EDDH	HAM	Hamburg Airport	Hamburg		53°37′49″N 9°59′28″E	
~~EDDI~~	~~THF~~	~~Tempelhof International Airport~~	Berlin		52°28′25″N 13°24′06″E	closed in 2008
EDDK	CGN	Cologne Bonn Airport	Cologne/Bonn		50°51′57″N 7°08′34″E	
EDDL	DUS	Düsseldorf Airport	Düsseldorf		51°17′22″N 6°46′00″E	
EDDM	MUC	Munich International Airport (Franz Josef Strauß International Airport)	Munich		48°21′14″N 11°47′10″E	
EDDN	NUE	Nuremberg Airport	Nuremberg		49°29′55″N 11°04′41″E	
EDDP	LEJ	Leipzig/Halle Airport	Leipzig/Halle		51°25′26″N 12°14′11″E	
EDDR	SCN	Saarbrücken Airport	Saarbrücken		49°12′52″N 7°06′34″E	
EDDS	STR	Stuttgart Echterdingen Airport	Stuttgart		48°41′24″N 9°13′19″E	
~~EDDT~~	~~TXL~~	~~Tegel International Airport~~	Berlin		52°33′35″N 13°17′16″E	closed in 2020
EDDV	HAJ	Hanover Airport	Hanover		52°27′37″N 9°41′01″E	
EDDW	BRE	Bremen Airport	Bremen		53°02′51″N 8°47′12″E	
EDEB		Bad Langensalza Airfield	Bad Langensalza		51°07′46″N 10°37′18″E	
EDEG		Gotha–Ost Airport	Gotha		50°58′12″N 10°43′40″E	
EDEH		Sonderlandeplatz Herrenteich	Herrenteich		49°20′42″N 8°29′16″E	
EDEL		Langenlonsheim Airport	Langenlonsheim		49°54′30″N 7°54′28″E	
EDEM		Mosenberg Airport	Falkenberg		51°03′46″N 9°25′19″E	
EDEN		Bad Hersfeld Airport	Bad Hersfeld		50°50′39″N 9°42′26″E	
EDEP		Heppenheim Airport	Heppenheim		49°37′19″N 8°37′28″E	
EDEQ		Muehlhausen Airport	Muehlhausen		51°12′47″N 10°32′55″E	
EDER		Flugplatz Wasserkuppe	Wasserkuppe		50°29′56″N 9°57′15″E	
EDEW		Wallduern Airport	Wallduern		49°34′54″N 9°24′08″E	
EDFA		Anspach/Taunus Airport	Neu-Anspach		50°17′18″N 8°32′02″E	
EDFB		Reichelsheim Airport	Reichelsheim		50°20′09″N 8°52′51″E	
EDFC		Aschaffenburg Airport	Aschaffenburg		49°56′20″N 9°03′46″E	
EDFD		Bad Neustadt/Saale–Grasberg Airport	Bad Neustadt		50°18′22″N 10°13′38″E	
EDFE	QEF	Frankfurt Egelsbach Airport	Frankfurt am Main		49°57′40″N 8°38′37″E	
EDFG		Flugplatz Gelnhausen	Gelnhausen		50°11′48″N 9°10′01″E	
EDFH	HHN	Frankfurt-Hahn Airport	Lautzenhausen	Rhineland-Palatinate	49°56′54″N 7°15′51″E	
EDFI		Hirzenhain Airport	Hirzenhain		50°47′16″N 8°23′34″E	
EDFJ		Lager Hammelburg Airport	Hammelburg		50°05′55″N 9°53′02″E	
EDFK		Bad Kissingen Airfield	Bad Kissingen		50°12′39″N 10°04′09″E	
EDFL		Giessen–Luetzellinden Airport	Giessen		50°32′41″N 8°35′34″E	
EDFM	MHG	Mannheim City Airport	Mannheim		49°28′21″N 8°30′51″E	
EDFN		Marburg-Schönstadt Airfield	Marburg		50°52′28″N 8°48′54″E	
EDFO		Michelstadt Airport	Michelstadt		49°40′42″N 8°58′18″E	
EDFP		Ober–Moerlen Airport	Ober-Moerlen		50°21′44″N 8°42′42″E	
EDFQ		Allendorf Airport	Allendorf		51°02′07″N 8°40′52″E	
EDFR		Rothenburg ob der Tauber Airport	Rothenburg ob der Tauber		49°23′20″N 10°13′07″E	
EDFS		Schweinfurt–Sued Airport	Schweinfurt		50°00′39″N 10°15′04″E	
EDFT		Flugplatz Lauterbach	Lauterbach		50°41′01″N 9°24′42″E	
EDFU		Mainbullau Airport	Mainbullau		49°41′42″N 9°10′56″E	
EDFV		Worms Airport	Worms	Rhineland-Palatinate	49°36′25″N 8°22′06″E	
EDFW		Airdrome Würzburg-Schenkenturm	Würzburg		49°49′04″N 9°53′52″E	
EDFX		Hockenheim Airport	Hockenheim		49°19′31″N 8°31′43″E	
EDFY		Flugplatz Elz	Elz		50°25′37″N 8°00′40″E	
EDFZ		Mainz-Finthen	Mainz		49°58′08″N 8°08′47″E	
EDGA		Flugplatz Ailertchen	Westerburg		50°35′35″N 7°56′42″E	
EDGB		Flugplatz Breitscheid	Breitscheid		50°40′35″N 8°10′10″E	
EDGE		Flugplatz Eisenach-Kindel	Hörselberg-Hainich		50°59′30″N 10°28′47″E	
EDGF		Fulda–Jossa Airport	Fulda		50°28′31″N 9°26′36″E	
EDGH		Hettstadt Airport	Hettstadt		49°47′55″N 9°50′12″E	
EDGI		Ingelfingen–Buehlhof Airport	Ingelfingen		49°19′18″N 9°39′47″E	
EDGK		Korbach Airport	Korbach		51°15′08″N 8°52′25″E	
EDGL		Ludwigshafen Berufsgen Heliport	Ludwigshafen		49°29′11″N 8°23′21″E	
EDGM		Mosbach–Lohrbach Airport	Mosbach		49°23′56″N 9°07′26″E	
EDGO		Oedheim Heliport	Oedheim		49°14′29″N 9°14′04″E	
EDGP		Oppenheim Airport	Oppenheim		49°50′30″N 8°22′36″E	
EDGQ		Schameder Airport	Erndtebrück		51°00′01″N 8°18′33″E	
EDGR		Giessen–Reiskirchen Airport	Giessen		50°33′59″N 8°52′09″E	
EDGS	SGE	Siegerland Airport	Burbach	North Rhine-Westphalia	50°42′28″N 8°04′59″E	
EDGT		Bottenhorn Airport	Bad Endbach	Hesse	50°47′43″N 8°27′30″E	
EDGU		Unterschüpf Airport	Unterschüpf		49°30′57″N 9°40′10″E	
EDGW		Wolfhagen "Graner Berg" Airport	Wolfhagen		51°18′26″N 9°10′31″E	
EDGX		Sonderlandeplatz Walldorf	Walldorf		49°18′11″N 8°39′32″E	
EDGY	KZG	Kitzingen Airport	Kitzingen		49°44′34″N 10°12′09″E	
EDGZ		Weinheim/Bergstrasse Airport	Weinheim		49°34′00″N 8°36′41″E	
EDHB		Grube Airport	Grube		54°14′40″N 11°01′29″E	
EDHC		Lüchow–Rehbeck Airport	Lüchow		53°01′02″N 11°08′41″E	
EDHD		Eichsfeld Airport	Eichsfeld		51°24′27″N 10°08′43″E	
EDHE		Uetersen Airfield	Heist		53°38′49″N 9°42′16″E	
EDHF		Itzehoe/Hungriger Wolf Airport	Itzehoe		53°59′31″N 9°34′35″E	
EDHG		Sonderlandeplatz Lüneburg	Lüneburg		53°14′54″N 10°27′31″E	
EDHI	XFW	Hamburg Finkenwerder Airport	Hamburg		53°32′09″N 9°50′13″E	
EDHK	KEL	Kiel Airport	Kiel		54°22′46″N 10°08′43″E	
EDHL	LBC	Lübeck Airport	Lübeck		53°48′19″N 10°43′09″E	
EDHM		Hartenholm Airport	Hartenholm		53°54′54″N 10°02′08″E	
EDHN		Neumünster Airport	Neumünster		54°04′46″N 9°56′29″E	
EDHO		Ahrenlohe Airport	Tornesch		53°42′01″N 9°44′32″E	
EDHS		Sonderlandeplatz Stade	Stade		53°33′40″N 9°29′57″E	
EDHU		Lauenbrück Airport	Lauenbrück		53°12′27″N 9°34′24″E	
EDHW		Wahlstedt Airport	Wahlstedt		53°58′10″N 10°13′18″E	
EDHY		Hoya Airport	Hoya		52°48′43″N 9°09′50″E	
EDJA	FMM	Memmingen Airport (Allgäu Airport)	Memmingen		47°59′33″N 10°14′37″E	
EDJG		Grabenstaett Airport	Grabenstaett		47°51′10″N 12°33′01″E	
EDKA	AAH	Aachen Merzbrück Airfield	Aachen		50°49′24″N 6°11′11″E	
EDKB		Bonn-Hangelar Airfield	Sankt Augustin		50°46′08″N 7°09′48″E	
EDKD		Altena–Hegenscheid Airport	Altena		51°18′45″N 7°42′15″E	
EDKF		Bergneustadt/Auf Dem Duempel Airport	Bergneustadt		51°03′08″N 7°42′25″E	
EDKH		Hünsborn Airport	Wenden		50°55′43″N 7°53′57″E	
EDKI		Betzdorf–Kirchen Airport	Katzwinkel		50°49′02″N 7°49′50″E	
EDKL		Leverkusen Airfield	Leverkusen		51°00′55″N 7°00′20″E	
EDKM		Meschede–Schueren Airport	Meschede		51°18′10″N 8°14′21″E	
EDKN		Wipperfürth–Neye Airport	Wipperfürth		51°07′27″N 7°22′25″E	
EDKO		Brilon/Hochsauerland Airport	Brilon		51°24′10″N 8°38′35″E	
EDKP		Plettenberg–Hueinghausen Airport	Plettenberg		51°11′31″N 7°47′28″E	
EDKR		Schmallenberg–Rennefeld Airport	Schmallenberg		51°09′41″N 8°15′38″E	
EDKU		Attendorn-Finnentrop Aerodrome	Finnentrop		51°08′45″N 7°56′12″E	
EDKV		Dahlemer Binz Airfield	Dahlem	Rhineland-Palatinate	50°24′20″N 6°31′44″E	
EDKW		Werdohl–Kuentrop Airport	Werdohl		51°17′50″N 7°49′06″E	
EDKZ		Meinerzhagen Airport	Meinerzhagen		51°05′58″N 7°35′49″E	
EDLA		Arnsberg–Menden Airport	Arnsberg		51°29′02″N 7°53′54″E	
EDLB		Flugplatz Borkenberge	Lüdinghausen		51°46′48″N 7°17′17″E	
EDLC		Kamp-Lintfort Airfield	Kamp-Lintfort		51°31′45″N 6°32′10″E	
EDLD		Flugplatz Schwarze Heide	Dinslaken		51°36′58″N 6°51′41″E	
EDLE	ESS	Essen/Mülheim Airport	Mülheim		51°24′12″N 6°56′24″E	
EDLF		Flugplatz Grefrath-Niershorst	Grefrath		51°20′02″N 6°21′34″E	
EDLG		Goch-Asperden Airport	Asperden		51°41′27″N 6°06′15″E	
EDLH		Hamm–Lippewiesen Airport	Hamm	North Rhine-Westphalia	51°41′23″N 7°48′58″E	
EDLI		Bielefeld Airport	Bielefeld	North Rhine-Westphalia	51°57′53″N 8°32′40″E	
EDLJ		Detmold Airport	Detmold		51°56′27″N 8°54′17″E	
EDLK	QKF	Krefeld-Egelsberg Airport	Krefeld		51°23′06″N 6°35′16″E	
EDLM		Marl–Loemuehle Airport	Recklinghausen		51°38′50″N 7°09′48″E	
EDLN	MGL	Düsseldorf-Mönchengladbach Airport	Mönchengladbach		51°13′49″N 6°30′16″E	
EDLO		Oerlinghausen Airfield	Oerlinghausen		51°56′35″N 8°40′12″E	
EDLP	PAD	Paderborn Lippstadt Airport	Paderborn / Lippstadt		51°36′55″N 8°37′02″E	
EDLR		Paderborn-Haxterberg Airfield	Paderborn		51°41′18″N 8°46′31″E	
EDLS		Stadtlohn-Vreden Airport	Stadtlohn		51°59′43″N 6°50′36″E	
EDLT		Verkehrslandeplatz Münster-Telgte	Telgte		51°56′41″N 7°46′25″E	
EDLV	NRN	Weeze Airport	Weeze		51°36′09″N 6°08′32″E	formerly Niederrhein Airport
EDLW	DTM	Dortmund Airport	Dortmund		51°31′06″N 7°36′44″E	
EDLX		Wesel-Römerwardt Airport	Wesel		51°39′46″N 6°35′45″E	
EDLY		Borken–Hoxfeld Airport	Borken	North Rhine-Westphalia	51°51′12″N 6°48′53″E	
EDLZ		Soest-Bad Sassendorf Airfield	Soest / Bad Sassendorf		51°34′41″N 8°12′53″E	
EDMA	AGB	Augsburg Airport	Augsburg		48°25′31″N 10°55′54″E	
EDMB		Biberach an der Riss Airport	Biberach an der Riss		48°06′44″N 9°45′50″E	
EDMC		Blaubeuren Airport	Blaubeuren		48°25′11″N 9°47′54″E	
EDMD		Dachau–Groebenried Airport	Dachau		48°13′43″N 11°25′20″E	
EDME		Flugplatz Eggenfelden	Pfarrkirchen		48°23′46″N 12°43′25″E	
EDMF		Fürstenzell Airport	Fürstenzell		48°31′05″N 13°20′45″E	
EDMG		Guenzburg–Donauried Airport	Günzburg		48°29′12″N 10°17′00″E	
EDMH		Gunzenhausen–Reutberg Airport	Gunzenhausen		49°06′44″N 10°46′56″E	
EDMI		Illertissen Airport	Illertissen		48°14′06″N 10°08′16″E	
EDMJ		Jesenwang Airport	Jesenwang		48°10′28″N 11°07′31″E	
EDMK		Kempten–Durach Airport	Kempten		47°41′31″N 10°20′17″E	
EDML		Landshut Airport	Landshut		48°30′43″N 12°02′05″E	
EDMN		Mindelheim–Mattsies Airport	Mindelheim		48°06′25″N 10°31′30″E	
EDMO	OBF	Oberpfaffenhofen Airport	Oberpfaffenhofen		48°04′53″N 11°16′59″E	
EDMP		Vilsbiburg Airport	Vilsbiburg		48°25′34″N 12°20′43″E	
EDMQ		Donauwörth Airport	Genderkingen		48°42′11″N 10°51′08″E	
EDMR		Ottobrunn Heliport	Ottobrunn		48°02′53″N 11°39′13″E	
EDMS	RBM	Straubing Wallmuhle Airport	Straubing		48°54′05″N 12°31′03″E	
EDMT		Flugplatz Tannheim	Tannheim		48°00′36″N 10°05′55″E	
EDMU		Gundelfingen Airport	Gundelfingen		48°34′10″N 10°21′31″E	
EDMV		Flugplatz Vilshofen	Vilshofen an der Donau		48°38′06″N 13°11′44″E	
EDMW		Deggendorf Airport	Deggendorf		48°49′49″N 12°52′47″E	
EDMX		Oberschleissheim Heliport	Oberschleissheim		48°14′17″N 11°33′56″E	
EDMY		Mühldorf Airport	Mühldorf		48°16′46″N 12°30′02″E	
EDMZ		Bad Waldsee–Reute Airport	Bad Waldsee		47°54′55″N 9°42′36″E	
EDNA		Ampfing Airport	Ampfing		48°15′49″N 12°24′42″E	
EDNB		Arnbruck Airport	Arnbruck		49°07′29″N 12°59′08″E	
EDNC		Beilngries Airport	Beilngries		49°01′17″N 11°29′05″E	
EDND		Dinkelsbühl–Sinbronn Airport	Dinkelsbühl		49°03′54″N 10°24′13″E	
EDNE		Erbach Airport	Erbach	Baden-Württemberg	48°20′32″N 9°54′58″E	
EDNF		Elsenthal–Grafenau Airport	Schönberg	Bavaria	48°49′21″N 13°22′03″E	
EDNG		Giengen/Brenz Airport	Giengen		48°38′03″N 10°12′59″E	
EDNH		Bad Wörishofen–Nord Airport	Bad Wörishofen		48°00′58″N 10°36′54″E	
EDNI		Berching Airport	Berching		49°07′52″N 11°26′36″E	
EDNJ		Neuburg–Egweil Airport	Egweil		48°46′55″N 11°12′55″E	
EDNK		Kirchdorf/Inn Airport	Kirchdorf		48°14′18″N 12°58′36″E	
EDNL		Leutkirch–Unterzeil Airport	Leutkirch		47°51′32″N 10°00′51″E	
EDNO		Nördlingen Airport	Nördlingen		48°52′14″N 10°30′18″E	
EDNP		Pfarrkirchen Airport	Pfarrkirchen		48°25′13″N 12°51′53″E	
EDNQ		Bopfingen Airport	Bopfingen		48°50′53″N 10°20′02″E	
EDNR		Regensburg-Oberhub	Regenstauf / Regensburg		49°08′31″N 12°04′55″E	
EDNS		Schwabmünchen Airport	Schwabmünchen		48°10′45″N 10°42′10″E	
EDNT		Treuchtlingen–Bubenheim Airport	Treuchtlingen		48°59′46″N 10°53′03″E	
EDNU		Thannhausen Airport	Thannhausen		48°17′24″N 10°26′31″E	
EDNV		Vogtareuth Airport	Vogtareuth		47°56′46″N 12°12′17″E	
EDNW		Weißenhorn Airport	Weißenhorn		48°17′22″N 10°08′25″E	
EDNX		Oberschleissheim Airport	Oberschleissheim		48°14′21″N 11°33′34″E	
EDNY	FDH	Friedrichshafen Airport (Bodensee Airport Friedrichshafen)	Friedrichshafen		47°40′17″N 9°30′41″E	
EDNZ		Zell–Haidberg Airport	Zell im Fichtelgebirge		50°08′13″N 11°47′40″E	
EDOA		Auerbach Airport	Auerbach		50°29′50″N 12°22′41″E	
EDOB		Bad Berka Airport	Bad Berka		50°54′16″N 11°15′37″E	
EDOC		Gardelegen Airport	Gardelegen		52°31′47″N 11°20′58″E	
EDOD		Reinsdorf Airfield	Teltow-Fläming		51°54′06″N 13°11′48″E	
EDOE		Boehlen Airport	Boehlen		51°12′50″N 12°21′49″E	
EDOF		Bad Frankenhausen Airport	Bad Frankenhausen		51°22′21″N 11°08′29″E	
EDOH		Langhennersdorf Airport	Oberschöna		50°56′54″N 13°15′42″E	
EDOI		Bienenfarm Airport	Paulinenaue		52°39′42″N 12°44′45″E	
EDOJ		Lüsse Airport	Wittenberg		52°08′34″N 12°40′17″E	
EDOK		Rudolstadt–Groschwitz Airport	Rudolstadt		50°43′58″N 11°14′10″E	
EDOL		Oschersleben Airport	Oschersleben		52°02′17″N 11°12′20″E	
EDOM		Klein Muehlingen Airport	Bördeland		51°56′51″N 11°46′11″E	
EDON		Neuhardenberg Airfield	Neuhardenberg		52°36′47″N 14°14′34″E	formerly Marxwalde Air Base
EDOP	SZW	Parchim International Airport	Parchim		53°25′43″N 11°46′55″E	
EDOQ		Oschatz Airport	Oschatz		51°17′48″N 13°04′43″E	
EDOR		Stölln/Rhinow Airport	Stölln		52°44′27″N 12°23′24″E	
EDOS		Pennewitz Airport	Pennewitz		50°40′11″N 11°03′04″E	
EDOT		Greiz–Obergrochlitz Airport	Greiz		50°38′38″N 12°10′28″E	
EDOU		Weimar–Umpferstedt Airport	Umpferstedt		50°57′54″N 11°23′59″E	
EDOV		Stendal-Borstel Airport	Stendal		52°37′44″N 11°49′07″E	
EDOW		Waren/Vielist Airport	Waren (Müritz)		53°34′06″N 12°39′10″E	
EDOX		Renneritz Airport	Sandersdorf-Brehna		51°35′42″N 12°14′16″E	
EDOY		Ahrensfelde Heliport	Ahrensfelde		52°36′04″N 13°34′34″E	
EDOZ		Schoenebeck–Zackmuende Airport	Schönebeck		51°59′50″N 11°47′23″E	
EDPA		Aalen–Heidenheim/Elchingen Airport	Neresheim		48°46′40″N 10°15′53″E	
EDPB		Bad Ditzenbach Airport	Bad Ditzenbach		48°33′46″N 9°43′44″E	
EDPC		Bad Endorf/Jolling Airport	Bad Endorf		47°55′37″N 12°17′14″E	
EDPD		Dingolfing Airport	Dingolfing		48°39′24″N 12°29′56″E	
EDPE		Eichstaett Airport	Eichstaett		48°52′43″N 11°10′47″E	
EDPF		Schwandorf Airport	Schwandorf		49°20′23″N 12°11′17″E	
EDPG		Griesau Airport	Pfatter		48°57′14″N 12°25′17″E	
EDPH		Schwabach–Büchenbach Airport	Büchenbach		49°16′05″N 11°00′45″E	
EDPI		Moosburg auf der Kippe Airport	Moosburg an der Isar		48°27′24″N 11°56′30″E	
EDPJ		Laichingen Airport	Laichingen		48°29′49″N 9°38′25″E	
EDPK		Schönberg Airport	Trostberg		48°02′52″N 12°30′02″E	
EDPM		Donzdorf Airport	Donzdorf		48°40′41″N 9°50′45″E	
EDPO		Neumarkt in der Oberpfalz Airport	Neumarkt in der Oberpfalz		49°17′08″N 11°26′35″E	
EDPQ		Schmidgaden Airport	Schmidgaden		49°25′46″N 12°05′53″E	
EDPR		Donauwörth Heliport	Donauwörth		48°42′27″N 10°46′09″E	
EDPS		Sonnen Airport	Sonnen		48°40′58″N 13°41′41″E	
EDPT		Gerstetten Airport	Gerstetten		48°37′13″N 10°03′30″E	
EDPU		Bartholomä–Amalienhof Airport	Bartholomä		48°44′48″N 10°00′18″E	
EDPW		Thalmässing–Waizenhofen Airport	Thalmässing		49°03′51″N 11°12′33″E	
EDPY		Ellwangen Airport	Ellwangen		48°57′41″N 10°14′04″E	
EDQA		Bamberg-Breitenau Airfield	Bamberg		49°55′13″N 10°54′51″E	
EDQB		Bad Windsheim Airport	Bad Windsheim		49°30′36″N 10°21′59″E	
EDQC		Coburg Brandensteinsebene Airfield	Coburg		50°15′45″N 10°59′44″E	
EDQD	BYU	Bindlacher Berg Airport (Bayreuth Airport)	Bayreuth		49°59′08″N 11°38′24″E	
EDQE	URD	Burg Feuerstein Airfield	Burg Feuerstein		49°47′39″N 11°08′01″E	
EDQF		Ansbach–Petersdorf Airport	Weihenzell		49°21′40″N 10°40′10″E	
EDQG		Giebelstadt Airport	Giebelstadt		49°38′52″N 9°57′54″E	
EDQH		Herzogenaurach Airport	Herzogenaurach		49°34′57″N 10°52′42″E	
EDQI		Lauf–Lillinghof Airport	Igensdorf / Schnaittach		49°36′19″N 11°17′01″E	
EDQK		Kulmbach Airport	Kulmbach		50°08′06″N 11°27′33″E	
EDQL		Lichtenfels Airfield	Lichtenfels		50°08′55″N 11°02′53″E	
EDQM	HOQ	Hof–Plauen Airport	Hof/Plauen	Bavaria	50°17′24″N 11°51′23″E	
EDQN		Neustadt an der Aisch Airport	Neustadt an der Aisch		49°35′15″N 10°34′39″E	
EDQO		Ottengrüner Heide Airport	Helmbrechts		50°13′33″N 11°43′54″E	
EDQP		Speichersdorf Rosenthal–Field Ploessen Airport	Speichersdorf		49°51′48″N 11°47′16″E	
EDQR		Ebern–Sendelbach Airport	Ebern		50°02′24″N 10°49′21″E	
EDQS		Suhl–Goldlauter Airport	Suhl		50°37′55″N 10°43′34″E	
EDQT		Haßfurt–Hassberge Airport	Haßfurt		50°01′06″N 10°31′45″E	
EDQW		Weiden in der Oberpfalz Airport	Weiden in der Oberpfalz		49°40′44″N 12°06′59″E	
EDQX		Hetzleser Berg Airport	Neunkirchen am Brand		49°38′32″N 11°09′45″E	
EDQY		Coburg Steinrücken Airfield	Coburg		50°13′50″N 10°59′43″E	
EDQZ		Pegnitz–Zipser Berg Airport	Pegnitz		49°45′45″N 11°34′29″E	
EDRA		Bad Neuenahr–Ahrweiler Airport	Bad Neuenahr		50°33′28″N 7°08′14″E	
EDRB	BBJ	Bitburg Airport	Bitburg		49°56′43″N 6°33′54″E	
EDRC		Marpingen Airport	Marpingen		49°27′11″N 7°02′20″E	
EDRD		Neumagen–Dhron Airport	Neumagen		49°50′35″N 6°54′58″E	
EDRE		Mendig Airfield	Mendig		50°21′55″N 7°18′45″E	formerly Mendig Air Base - ETHM
EDRF		Bad Dürkheim Airport	Bad Dürkheim		49°28′22″N 8°11′45″E	
EDRG		Idar–Oberstein/Goettschied Airport	Idar-Oberstein		49°43′56″N 7°20′10″E	
EDRH		Hoppstädten-Weiersbach Airfield	Hoppstädten		49°36′38″N 7°11′07″E	
EDRI		Linkenheim Airport	Linkenheim-Hochstetten		49°08′30″N 8°23′41″E	
EDRJ		Saarlouis–Düren Airport	Saarlouis		49°18′45″N 6°40′28″E	
EDRK		Koblenz-Winningen Airport	Winningen, Mosel		50°19′30″N 7°31′59″E	
EDRL		Lachen–Speyerdorf Airport	Neustadt an der Weinstraße		49°19′51″N 8°12′35″E	
EDRM		Traben–Trarbach/Mont Royal	Traben-Trarbach		49°58′04″N 7°06′43″E	
EDRN		Nannhausen Airfield	Nannhausen		49°58′12″N 7°28′42″E	
EDRO		Schweighofen Airport	Schweighofen		49°01′55″N 7°59′26″E	
EDRP		Pirmasens Airport	Pirmasens		49°15′52″N 7°29′18″E	
EDRQ		Imsweiler Airport	Imsweiler		49°36′24″N 7°47′44″E	
EDRS		Bad Sobernheim–Domberg Airport	Bad Sobernheim		49°47′27″N 7°39′58″E	
EDRT	ZQE	Trier-Föhren Airport	Trier		49°51′48″N 6°47′17″E	
EDRV		Wershofen/Eifel Airport	Wershofen		50°27′07″N 6°47′03″E	
EDRW		Dierdorf–Wienau Airport	Dierdorf		50°33′58″N 7°39′12″E	
EDRY		Flugplatz Speyer	Speyer		49°18′17″N 8°27′05″E	
EDRZ	ZQW	Zweibrücken Airport	Zweibrücken		49°12′35″N 7°24′02″E	
EDSA		Albstadt–Degerfeld Airport	Albstadt		48°14′59″N 9°03′45″E	
EDSB	FKB	Karlsruhe/Baden-Baden Airport	Baden-Baden / Karlsruhe		48°46′46″N 8°04′50″E	
EDSD		Deckenpfronn Airport	Deckenpfronn		48°38′19″N 8°49′03″E	
EDSE		Göppingen–Bezgenriet	Göppingen		48°39′31″N 9°37′27″E	
EDSG		Grabenstetten Airport	Grabenstetten		48°32′10″N 9°26′13″E	
EDSH		Flugplatz Backnang-Heiningen	Backnang		48°55′11″N 9°27′19″E	
EDSI		Binningen Airport	Hilzingen		47°47′56″N 8°43′07″E	
EDSK		Kehl–Sundheim Airport	Kehl		48°33′40″N 7°50′36″E	
EDSL		Blumberg Airport	Blumberg		47°50′37″N 8°33′52″E	
EDSM		Müllheim Airport	Müllheim		47°49′28″N 7°38′22″E	
EDSN		Neuhausen ob Eck Airfield	Neuhausen ob Eck		47°58′35″N 8°54′14″E	
EDSO		Gruibingen–Nortel Airport	Gruibingen		48°37′16″N 9°39′21″E	
EDSP		Poltringen Airfield	Poltringen		48°32′49″N 8°56′41″E	
EDSR		Radolfzell–Stahringen Airport	Radolfzell		47°48′09″N 8°58′46″E	
EDST		Hahnweide Airport	Kirchheim unter Teck		48°37′55″N 9°25′45″E	
EDSV		Wächtersberg Airport	Wildberg	Baden-Württemberg	48°36′54″N 8°45′20″E	
EDSW		Altdorf–Wallburg Airport	Ettenheim		48°16′12″N 7°50′31″E	
EDSZ		Rottweil–Zepfenhan Airport	Rottweil		48°11′12″N 8°43′22″E	
EDTA		Bohlhof Airport	Wutöschingen		47°39′03″N 8°23′12″E	
EDTB		Flugplatz Baden-Oos	Baden-Baden		48°47′31″N 8°11′09″E	
EDTC		Bruchsal Airport	Bruchsal		49°08′05″N 8°33′51″E	
EDTD	ZQL	Flugplatz Donaueschingen-Villingen	Donaueschingen		47°58′24″N 8°31′20″E	
EDTE		Flugplatz Eutingen	Eutingen im Gäu		48°29′08″N 8°46′41″E	
EDTF	QFB	Freiburg Airport	Freiburg		48°01′22″N 7°49′57″E	
EDTG		Bremgarten Airport	Bremgarten		47°54′11″N 7°37′03″E	
EDTH		Heubach Airport	Heubach		48°48′11″N 9°55′40″E	
EDTK		Sinsheim Airport	Sinsheim		49°14′50″N 8°53′38″E	
EDTL	LHA	Flughafen Lahr	Lahr		48°22′09″N 7°49′40″E	
EDTM		Flugplatz Mengen-Hohentengen	Mengen		48°03′14″N 9°22′22″E	
EDTN		Nabern/Teck Airport	Kirchheim unter Teck		48°36′46″N 9°28′38″E	
EDTO		Offenburg Airport	Offenburg		48°26′53″N 7°55′25″E	
EDTP		Pfullendorf Airport	Pfullendorf		47°54′32″N 9°15′02″E	
EDTQ		Pattonville Airfield	Pattonville		48°51′51″N 9°13′29″E	
EDTR		Flugplatz Herten	Rheinfelden	Baden-Württemberg	47°33′37″N 7°44′54″E	
EDTS		Schwenningen am Neckar Airport	Villingen-Schwenningen		48°03′57″N 8°34′17″E	
EDTU		Saulgau Airport	Saulgau		48°01′46″N 9°30′26″E	
EDTW		Winzeln–Schramberg Airport	Fluorn-Winzeln		48°16′45″N 8°25′42″E	
EDTX		Weckrieden Airport	Schwäbisch Hall		49°07′28″N 9°46′52″E	
EDTY		Adolf Würth Airport	Schwäbisch Hall		49°07′06″N 9°47′02″E	
EDTZ		Konstanz Airport	Konstanz		47°40′53″N 9°08′21″E	
EDUA		Stechow–Ferchesar Airport	Stechow-Ferchesar		52°39′02″N 12°29′16″E	
~~EDUC~~		~~Brand-Briesen Airfield~~	Halbe		52°02′09″N 13°44′47″E	
EDUF		Falkenberg–Lönnewitz Airport	Falkenberg		51°32′52″N 13°13′41″E	
EDUO		Oberrissdorf Airport	Lutherstadt Eisleben		51°32′34″N 11°35′43″E	
EDUP		Perleberg Airport	Perleberg		53°04′14″N 11°49′07″E	
~~EDUW~~		~~RAF Wildenrath~~	Wildenrath		51°06′52″N 6°13′18″E	
EDUY		Sedlitzer See Water Aerodrome	Senftenberg		51°33′28″N 14°06′18″E	
EDUZ		Zerbst Airport	Zerbst		52°00′03″N 12°08′55″E	
EDVA		Flugplatz Bad Gandersheim	Bad Gandersheim		51°51′15″N 10°01′40″E	
EDVC		Celle–Arloh Airport	Celle		52°41′17″N 10°06′46″E	
EDVE	BWE	Braunschweig-Wolfsburg Airport	Braunschweig		52°19′09″N 10°33′19″E	
EDVF		Blomberg–Borkhausen Airport	Blomberg	North Rhine-Westphalia	51°55′02″N 9°06′42″E	
EDVG		Mengeringhausen Airport	Mengeringhausen		51°22′35″N 8°58′52″E	
EDVH		Hodenhagen Airport	Hodenhagen		52°45′43″N 9°36′38″E	
EDVI		Flugplatz Höxter-Holzminden	Höxter / Holzminden		51°48′24″N 9°22′42″E	
EDVJ		Salzgitter–Schäferstuhl Airport	Salzgitter		52°01′50″N 10°21′45″E	
EDVK	KSF	Kassel Calden Airport	Kassel		51°25′15″N 9°23′32″E	
EDVL		Hölleberg Airport	Trendelburg		51°36′39″N 9°23′54″E	
EDVM	ZNO	Hildesheim Airfield	Hildesheim		52°10′47″N 9°56′45″E	
EDVN		Northeim Airport	Northeim		51°42′23″N 10°02′23″E	
EDVP		Peine–Glindbruchkippe Airport	Peine		52°19′26″N 10°10′53″E	
EDVQ		Wilsche Airport	Wilsche		52°31′29″N 10°27′45″E	
EDVR		Rinteln Airport	Rinteln		52°10′31″N 9°03′12″E	
EDVT		Ithwiesen Airport	Eschershausen		51°57′07″N 9°39′43″E	
EDVU		Ülzen Airport	Gerdau		52°59′01″N 10°27′56″E	
EDVW		Flugplatz Bad Pyrmont	Bad Pyrmont		51°58′00″N 9°17′30″E	
EDVX		Gifhorn Bundespolizei Heliport	Gifhorn		52°29′43″N 10°30′37″E	
EDVY		Porta Westfalica Airport	Porta Westfalica		52°13′17″N 8°51′35″E	
EDVZ		Fuldatal Ihringshausen Airport	Fuldatal		51°21′34″N 9°30′10″E	
~~EDWB~~	~~BRV~~	~~Bremerhaven Airport~~	Bremerhaven		53°30′25″N 8°34′22″E	closed in 2016
EDWC		Flugplatz Damme	Damme		52°29′15″N 8°11′07″E	
EDWE	EME	Emden Airport	Emden		53°23′28″N 7°13′39″E	
EDWF		Flugplatz Leer Papenburg	Leer	Lower Saxony	53°16′19″N 7°26′30″E	
EDWG		Wangerooge Airfield	Wangerooge		53°47′00″N 7°55′00″E	
EDWH		Flugplatz Oldenburg-Hatten	Hatten		53°04′08″N 8°18′49″E	
EDWI	WVN	JadeWeser Airport	Wilhelmshaven		53°30′11″N 8°03′10″E	
EDWJ		Juist Airport	Juist		53°40′53″N 7°03′23″E	
EDWK		Karlshöfen Airport	Karlshöfen		53°19′58″N 9°01′42″E	
EDWL		Langeoog Airport	Langeoog		53°44′33″N 7°29′47″E	
EDWM		Weser–Wümme Airport	Hellwege		53°03′14″N 9°12′31″E	
EDWN		Nordhorn–Lingen Airport	Nordhorn		52°27′27″N 7°10′56″E	
EDWO		Atterheide Airfield	Osnabrück		52°17′12″N 7°58′11″E	
EDWP		Wiefelstede/Conneforde Airport	Wiefelstede		53°19′17″N 8°04′24″E	
EDWQ		Ganderkesee Atlas Airport	Ganderkesee		53°02′10″N 8°30′20″E	
EDWR		Borkum Airfield	Borkum		53°35′44″N 6°42′33″E	
EDWS	NOD	Norden-Norddeich Airport	Norden	Lower Saxony	53°37′59″N 7°11′25″E	
EDWT		Blexen Airport	Nordenham		53°32′18″N 8°32′20″E	
EDWU	VAC	Varrelbusch Airport	Cloppenburg		52°54′30″N 8°02′35″E	
EDWV		Verden–Scharnhorst Airport	Scharnhorst		52°57′55″N 9°16′58″E	
EDWX		Westerstede–Felde Airport	Westerstede		53°17′19″N 7°55′50″E	
EDWY		Norderney Airfield	Norderney		53°42′25″N 7°13′49″E	
EDWZ		Baltrum Airport	Baltrum		53°43′29″N 7°22′24″E	
EDXA		Flugplatz Achmer	Achmer		52°22′39″N 7°54′49″E	
EDXB	HEI	Heide-Büsum Airport	Heide		54°09′13″N 8°53′55″E	
EDXC		Schleswig–Kropp Airport	Kropp		54°25′32″N 9°32′31″E	
EDXD		Bohmte–Bad Essen Airport	Bohmte		52°21′05″N 8°19′42″E	
EDXE		Rheine–Eschendorf Airport	Rheine		52°16′35″N 7°29′34″E	
EDXF	FLF	Flensburg-Schäferhaus Airport	Flensburg		54°46′25″N 9°22′36″E	
EDXG		Melle–Groenegau Airport	Melle		52°12′03″N 8°22′50″E	
EDXH	HGL	Heligoland Airfield	Heligoland		54°11′09″N 7°54′52″E	
EDXI		Nienburg–Holzbalge Airport	Balge		52°42′35″N 9°09′45″E	
EDXJ	QHU	Husum Schwesing Airport	Husum		54°30′55″N 9°08′41″E	
EDXK		Leck Air Base	Leck		54°47′35″N 8°56′54″E	joint military/civilian use
EDXL		Barssel Airport	Barssel		53°09′52″N 7°47′38″E	
EDXM		Flugplatz Sankt Michaelisdonn	Sankt Michaelisdonn		53°58′42″N 9°08′43″E	
EDXN		Nordholz–Spieka Airport	Wurster Nordseeküste		53°46′02″N 8°38′37″E	
EDXO	PSH	Sankt Peter-Ording Airport	Sankt Peter-Ording		54°18′30″N 8°40′58″E	
EDXP		Harle Airfield	Harlesiel		53°42′24″N 7°49′12″E	
EDXQ		Rotenburg Airport	Rotenburg		53°07′42″N 9°20′55″E	
EDXR		Rendsburg–Schachtholm Airport	Rendsburg		54°13′12″N 9°35′58″E	
EDXT		Sierksdorf/Hof Altona Airport	Sierksdorf		54°04′00″N 10°44′32″E	
EDXU		Hüttenbusch Airport	Worpswede		53°17′12″N 8°56′50″E	
EDXW	GWT	Sylt Airport	Westerland	Schleswig-Holstein	54°54′48″N 8°20′26″E	
EDXY		Wyk auf Föhr Airport	Wyk auf Föhr		54°41′04″N 8°31′42″E	
EDXZ		Kührstedt–Bederkesa Airport	Kührstedt		53°34′05″N 8°47′22″E	

=== ET – Military airports ===
Originally assigned to East Germany (e.g. ETBS was used for East Berlin's Schönefeld airport), prefix ET was inherited by Federal Republic of Germany after reunification and reused as a prefix for Germany military aerodromes.

ICAO	IATA	Airport name	Community	State	Coordinates	Notes
ETAD	SPM	Spangdahlem Air Base	Spangdahlem		49°58′33″N 6°41′50″E	
ETAR	RMS	Ramstein Air Base	Ramstein		49°26′13″N 7°36′00″E	
~~ETBB~~		~~Cologne Butzweilerhof Airport~~	~~Cologne~~		50°59′05″N 6°53′29″E	closed
ETEB		Ansbach Army Heliport	Ansbach		49°18′33″N 10°38′13″E	
~~ETEJ~~		~~Bamberg-Breitenau Airfield~~	~~Bamberg~~		49°54′14″N 10°54′52″E	see EDQA
ETED		Kaiserslautern Depot Army Heliport	Kaiserslautern		49°26′52″N 7°50′22″E	
ETEK		Baumholder Army Airfield	Baumholder		49°39′05″N 7°18′19″E	
ETHA		Altenstadt Air Base	Altenstadt	Bavaria	47°50′06″N 10°52′16″E	
ETHB		Bückeburg Air Base	Bückeburg		52°15′42″N 9°04′55″E	
ETHC	ZCN	Celle Air Base	Celle		52°35′28″N 10°01′20″E	
ETHE	ZPQ	Rheine-Bentlage Air Base	Rheine		52°17′32″N 7°23′06″E	
ETHF	FRZ	Fritzlar Air Base	Fritzlar		51°07′00″N 9°17′14″E	
ETHH		Bonn-Hardthöhe Air Base	Bonn		50°41′47″N 7°02′42″E	
ETHL		Laupheim Air Base	Laupheim		48°13′13″N 9°54′36″E	
~~ETHM~~		~~Mendig Air Base~~	Mendig		50°21′55″N 7°18′45″E	now Mendig Airfield - EDRE
ETHN		Niederstetten Air Base	Niederstetten		49°24′03″N 9°55′05″E	
ETHR		Roth Air Base	Roth		49°13′05″N 11°06′01″E	
ETHS		Faßberg Air Base	Faßberg		52°55′10″N 10°11′20″E	
ETHT		Cottbus Air Base	Cottbus		51°46′07″N 14°17′43″E	
ETIC		Grafenwöhr Army Airfield	Grafenwöhr		49°41′55″N 11°56′25″E	
~~ETID~~		~~Hanau Army Airfield~~	~~Erlensee~~	~~Hessen~~	50°10′03″N 8°57′41″E	formerly Fliegerhorst Langendiebach; closed in 2007
ETIH		Hohenfels Army Airfield	Hohenfels	Bavaria	49°12′59″N 11°50′10″E	
ETIK		Illesheim Army Heliport	Illesheim		49°28′26″N 10°23′17″E	
~~ETIN~~	~~KZG~~	~~Kitzingen Airport~~	~~Kitzingen~~	~~Bavaria~~	49°44′34″N 10°12′09″E	formerly Kitzingen Army Airfield; closed in 2007
ETIP		Landstuhl Army Heliport	Landstuhl		49°24′11″N 7°32′10″E	
ETIY		Landstuhl Regional Medical Center Heliport	Landstuhl		49°24′09″N 7°33′31″E	
ETJB		Schonewald CRC Helipad	Cölpin		53°30′36″N 13°26′08″E	
ETMN	FCN	Sea-Airport Cuxhaven/Nordholz (Nordholz Naval Airbase)	Nordholz		53°46′06″N 8°39′51″E	
ETND		Diepholz Air Base	Diepholz		52°35′07″N 8°20′27″E	
ETNG	GKE	NATO Air Base Geilenkirchen	Geilenkirchen		50°57′39″N 6°02′33″E	
ETNH		Hohn Air Base	Hohn	Schleswig-Holstein	54°18′49″N 9°32′17″E	
ETNJ		Jever Air Base	Schortens		53°32′02″N 7°53′05″E	
ETNK		Wahn Air Base	Cologne/Bonn		50°51′57″N 7°08′34″E	military part of Cologne Bonn Airport
ETNL	RLG	Rostock Laage Airport	Rostock		53°55′06″N 12°16′42″E	
ETNN		Nörvenich Air Base	Nörvenich		50°49′54″N 6°39′30″E	
ETNP		Rheine-Hopsten Air Base	Rheine		52°20′19″N 7°32′29″E	
ETNS	WBG	Schleswig Air Base	Schleswig		54°27′34″N 9°30′59″E	
ETNT		Wittmundhafen Air Base	Wittmund		53°32′52″N 7°40′02″E	
~~ETNU~~	~~FNB~~	~~Neubrandenburg Airport~~	Neubrandenburg		53°36′08″N 13°18′22″E	see EDBN
ETNW		Wunstorf Air Base	Wunstorf		52°27′17″N 9°25′44″E	
ETOA		Schweinfurt Army Heliport	Schweinfurt		50°02′59″N 10°10′04″E	
ETOI		Vilseck Army Airfield	Vilseck		49°38′03″N 11°46′03″E	
ETOR		Coleman Army Airfield	Mannheim		49°33′47″N 8°27′46″E	
ETOU	WIE	Wiesbaden Army Airfield	Wiesbaden		50°02′58″N 8°19′28″E	
ETSA		Landsberg-Lech Air Base	Landsberg am Lech		48°4′00″N 10°54′00″E	
ETSB		Büchel Air Base	Büchel / Cochem		50°10′35″N 7°03′28″E	
ETSE		Erding Air Base	Erding		48°19′21″N 11°56′55″E	
~~ETSF~~	~~FEL~~	~~Fürstenfeldbruck Air Base~~	Fürstenfeldbruck		48°12′24″N 11°15′59″E	closed 2010
ETSH		Holzdorf Air Base	Jessen (Elster)		51°46′04″N 13°10′03″E	
ETSI	IGS	Ingolstadt Manching Airport	Ingolstadt		48°42′56″N 11°32′02″E	
ETSK		Kaufbeuren Air Base	Kaufbeuren		47°51′44″N 10°36′53″E	
ETSL		Lechfeld Air Base	Lechfeld		48°11′10″N 10°51′42″E	
ETSN	NEU	Neuburg Air Base	Neuburg		48°42′42″N 11°12′42″E	
ETUL	LRC	RAF Laarbruch	Weeze		51°36′09″N 6°08′32″E	closed in 1999; now Weeze Airport; see EDLV
ETUO	GUT	RAF Gütersloh	Gütersloh		51°55′31″N 8°18′23″E	closed in 1993
ETUR	BGN	RAF Brüggen	Brüggen		51°12′00″N 6°07′46″E	closed in 2001
ETWM		Meppen Air Base	Meppen		52°43′24″N 7°19′35″E	

== EE – Estonia ==
Also see airport category and list.

ICAO	IATA	Airport name	Community	Coordinates	Notes
EEAA		Antsla Airfield	Antsla	57°49′34″N 26°29′33″E	
EECL		Linnahall Heliport	Tallinn	59°26′53″N 24°45′12″E	
EEEI		Ämari Air Base	Ämari	59°15′44″N 24°13′07″E	
EEHA		Humala Airfield	Humala	59°21′21″N 24°22′35″E	
EEHU		Haapsalu Airfield	Haapsalu	58°54′42″N 23°29′18″E	Closed
EEJI		Jõhvi Airfield	Jõhvi	59°19′33″N 27°23′33″E	
EEKA	KDL	Kärdla Airport	Kärdla	58°59′27″N 22°49′51″E	
EEKE	URE	Kuressaare Airport	Kuressaare	58°13′48″N 22°30′34″E	
EEKI		Karksi Airfield	Karksi-Nuia / Polli	58°06′56″N 25°33′10″E	
EEKU		Kihnu Airfield	Kihnu	58°08′54″N 24°00′09″E	
EELM		Estonian Aviation Museum	Lange	58°17′17″N 26°45′51″E	
EELU		Lyckholm Airfield	Saare	59°01′21″N 23°34′36″E	
EENI		Nurmsi Airfield	Nurmsi	58°51′41″N 25°44′06″E	Closed
EENA		Narva Airfield	Narva	59°23′22″N 28°06′41″E	
EEPR		Piirissaare Airfield	Piirissaar	58°22′44″N 27°31′24″E	Closed
EEPU	EPU	Pärnu Airport	Pärnu	58°25′08″N 24°28′22″E	
EERA		Rapla Airfield	Rapla	58°59′11″N 24°43′28″E	
EERD		Riidaja Airfield	Riidaja	58°05′07″N 25°53′56″E	
EERE		Rakvere Airfield	Rakvere	59°22′06″N 26°21′29″E	
EERI		Ridali Airfield	Ridali	57°56′34″N 26°58′40″E	
EERU		Ruhnu Airfield	Ruhnu	57°47′02″N 23°15′58″E	
EETA		Tapa Airfield	Tapa	59°14′06″N 25°57′06″E	
EETI		Tõutsi Airfield	Tõutsi	57°57′21″N 26°28′33″E	
EETN	TLL	Lennart Meri Tallinn Airport	Tallinn	59°24′48″N 24°49′57″E	
EETR		Raadi Airfield	Tartu	58°24′17″N 26°46′25″E	Closed
EETU	TAY	Tartu Airport	Tartu	58°18′27″N 26°41′13″E	
EEVI		Viljandi Airfield	Viljandi	58°20′55″N 25°29′40″E	
EEVO		Vormsi Airfield	Vormsi	58°59′07″N 23°15′06″E	

== EF – Finland ==
Also see airport category and list.

ICAO	IATA	Airport name	Community	Coordinates	Notes
EFAA		Aavahelukka Airfield	Kolari	67°36′13″N 23°58′18″E	
EFAH		Ahmosuo Airport	Oulu	64°53′43″N 25°45′08″E	
EFAL		Alavus Airport	Alavus	62°33′17″N 23°34′24″E	
EFEJ		Jorvi Hospital Heliport	Espoo	60°13′22″N 24°41′24″E	
EFEK		Kilpisjärvi Heliport	Enontekiö	69°00′08″N 20°53′47″E	
EFET	ENF	Enontekiö Airport	Enontekiö	68°21′52″N 23°25′39″E	
EFEU		Eura Airport	Eura	61°06′58″N 22°12′05″E	
EFFO		Forssa Airport	Forssa	60°48′07″N 23°38′44″E	
EFGE		Genböle Airfield	Kimitoön (Dragsfjärd)	60°05′13″N 22°31′19″E	
EFHA	KEV	Halli Airport	Kuorevesi	61°51′23″N 24°47′21″E	
EFHE		Hernesaari Heliport	Helsinki	60°08′52″N 24°55′27″E	
EFHF	HEM	Helsinki-Malmi Airport	Helsinki	60°15′14″N 25°02′39″E	
EFHH		Kanta-Häme Central Hospital Heliport	Hämeenlinna	60°59′28″N 24°24′56″E	
EFHJ		Haapajärvi Airfield	Haapajärvi	63°42′43″N 25°23′41″E	
EFHK	HEL	Helsinki-Vantaa Airport	Vantaa	60°19′02″N 24°57′48″E	
EFHL		Hailuoto Airfield	Hailuoto	64°58′12″N 24°42′18″E	
EFHM		Hämeenkyrö Airport	Hämeenkyrö	61°41′25″N 23°04′27″E	
EFHN		Hanko Airport (Hangö Airport)	Hanko (Hangö)	59°50′44″N 23°04′56″E	
EFHO		Oulu University Hospital Heliport	Oulu	65°00′34″N 25°31′06″E	
EFHP		Haapavesi Airfield	Haapavesi	64°06′47″N 25°30′15″E	
EFHS		Seinäjoki Central Hospital Heliport	Seinäjoki	62°46′20″N 22°49′08″E	
EFHV	HYV	Hyvinkää Airport	Hyvinkää	60°39′16″N 24°52′52″E	
EFHY		Helsinki University Hospital/Meilahti Heliport	Helsinki	60°11′20″N 24°54′27″E	
EFII		Iisalmi Airfield	Iisalmi	63°37′55″N 27°07′20″E	
EFIK		Kiikala Airport	Kiikala	60°27′46″N 23°39′04″E	
EFIM		Immola Airport	Imatra	61°14′59″N 28°54′13″E	
EFIT	KTQ	Kitee Airport	Kitee	62°09′58″N 30°04′25″E	
EFIV	IVL	Ivalo Airport	Ivalo / Inari	68°36′39″N 27°24′50″E	
EFJE		Northern Karelia Central Hospital Heliport	Joensuu	62°35′28″N 29°46′40″E	
EFJM		Jämijärvi Airport	Jämijärvi	61°46′43″N 22°42′58″E	
EFJO	JOE	Joensuu Airport	Joensuu / Liperi	62°39′32″N 29°37′28″E	
EFJV		Central Finland Central Hospital Heliport	Jyväskylä	62°13′47″N 25°42′15″E	
EFJY	JYV	Jyväskylä Airport	Jyväskylän maalaiskunta	62°24′03″N 25°40′22″E	
EFKA	KAU	Kauhava Airport	Kauhava	63°07′27″N 23°03′04″E	
EFKE	KEM	Kemi-Tornio Airport	Kemi / Tornio	65°46′45″N 24°35′05″E	
EFKG		Kumlinge Airfield	Kumlinge	60°14′49″N 20°48′17″E	
EFKH		Kuhmo Airfield	Kuhmo	64°06′45″N 29°26′19″E	
EFKI	KAJ	Kajaani Airport	Kajaani	64°17′03″N 27°41′15″E	
EFKJ	KHJ	Kauhajoki Airport	Kauhajoki	62°27′49″N 22°23′28″E	
EFKK	KOK	Kokkola-Pietarsaari Airport	Kronoby	63°43′13″N 23°08′21″E	
EFKM		Kemijärvi Airport	Kemijärvi	66°42′57″N 27°09′26″E	
EFKN		Kannus Airfield	Kannus	63°55′14″N 24°05′12″E	
EFKO		Kalajoki Airport	Kalajoki	64°13′43″N 23°49′35″E	
EFKR		Kärsämäki Airfield	Kärsämäki	63°59′21″N 25°44′37″E	
EFKS	KAO	Kuusamo Airport	Kuusamo	65°59′25″N 29°13′55″E	
EFKT	KTT	Kittilä Airport	Kittilä	67°41′55″N 24°50′53″E	
EFKU	KUO	Kuopio Airport	Kuopio / Siilinjärvi	63°00′31″N 27°47′40″E	
EFKV		Kivijärvi Airport	Kivijärvi	63°07′31″N 25°07′27″E	
EFKY		Kymi Airport	Kymi	60°34′17″N 26°53′46″E	
EFLA		Vesivehmaa Airport	Lahti	61°08′39″N 25°41′35″E	
EFLL		Lapinlahti Airfield	Lapinlahti	63°23′58″N 27°28′44″E	
EFLN		Lieksa-Nurmes Airfield	Lieksa	63°30′43″N 29°37′45″E	
EFLP	LPP	Lappeenranta Airport	Lappeenranta	61°02′45″N 28°08′55″E	
EFLR		Lapland Central Hospital Heliport	Rovaniemi	66°29′30″N 25°46′44″E	
EFMA	MHQ	Mariehamn Airport	Mariehamn	60°07′19″N 19°53′47″E	
EFME		Menkijärvi Airport	Alajärvi	62°56′48″N 23°31′08″E	
EFMI	MIK	Mikkeli Airport	Mikkeli	61°41′11″N 27°12′00″E	
EFMN		Mäntsälä Airfield	Mäntsälä	60°34′21″N 25°30′32″E	
EFNS		Savikko Airfield	Nurmijärvi	60°31′12″N 24°49′54″E	
EFNU		Nummela Airport	Nummela	60°20′02″N 24°17′47″E	
EFOP		Oripää Airfield	Oripää	60°52′35″N 22°44′41″E	
EFOU	OUL	Oulu Airport	Oulunsalo	64°55′42″N 25°22′27″E	
EFPA		Pokka Airfield	Kittilä	68°09′01″N 25°49′46″E	
EFPE		Peijas Hospital Heliport	Vantaa	60°19′52″N 25°03′40″E	
EFPI		Piikajärvi Airport	Kokemäki	61°14′43″N 22°11′42″E	
EFPJ		Kuopio University Hospital Heliport	Kuopio	62°53′50″N 27°38′58″E	
EFPK		Pieksämäki Airport	Pieksämäki	62°15′53″N 27°00′10″E	
EFPL		Päijät-Häme Central Hospital Heliport	Päijät-Häme	60°59′30″N 25°34′10″E	
EFPN		Punkaharju Airfield	Punkaharju	61°43′44″N 29°23′37″E	
EFPO	POR	Pori Airport	Pori	61°27′41″N 21°47′52″E	
EFPR		Pyhtää Redstone Aerodrome	Pyhtää	60°28′45″N 26°35′38″E	
EFPT		Tampere University Hospital Heliport	Tampere	61°30′17″N 23°48′48″E	
EFPU		Pudasjärvi Airport	Pudasjärvi	65°24′08″N 26°56′49″E	
EFPY		Pyhäsalmi Airport	Pyhäsalmi	63°43′45″N 25°55′55″E	
EFRA		Rautavaara Airfield	Rautavaara	63°25′27″N 28°07′27″E	
EFRH		Pattijoki Airport	Raahe	64°41′17″N 24°41′45″E	
EFRN		Rantasalmi Airport	Rantasalmi	62°03′56″N 28°21′24″E	
EFRO	RVN	Rovaniemi Airport	Rovaniemi	66°33′42″N 25°49′51″E	
EFRU		Ranua Airport	Ranua	65°58′23″N 26°21′55″E	
EFRV		Kiuruvesi Airport	Kiuruvesi	63°42′20″N 26°36′59″E	
EFRY		Räyskälä Airport	Loppi	60°44′41″N 24°06′28″E	
EFSA	SVL	Savonlinna Airport	Savonlinna	61°56′34″N 28°56′42″E	
EFSE		Selänpää Airport	Kouvola	61°03′51″N 26°47′44″E	
EFSI	SJY	Seinäjoki Airport	Seinäjoki / Ilmajoki	62°41′37″N 22°49′55″E	
EFSO	SOT	Sodankylä Airport	Sodankylä	67°23′48″N 26°37′05″E	
EFSU		Suomussalmi Airfield	Suomussalmi	64°49′19″N 28°42′37″E	
EFTO		Torbacka Airfield	Ingå	60°04′46″N 24°10′32″E	
EFTP	TMP	Tampere-Pirkkala Airport	Tampere / Pirkkala	61°24′55″N 23°35′16″E	
EFTS		Teisko Airport	Tampere	61°46′23″N 24°01′31″E	
EFTU	TKU	Turku Airport	Turku	60°30′53″N 22°15′42″E	
EFTV		Turku University Hospital Heliport	Turku	60°27′11″N 22°17′45″E	
EFUT	UTI	Utti Air Base	Utti / Valkeala	60°53′47″N 26°56′17″E	
EFVA	VAA	Vaasa Airport	Vaasa	63°02′43″N 21°45′51″E	
EFVI		Viitasaari Airfield	Viitasaari	63°07′21″N 25°48′58″E	
EFVL		Vaala Airfield	Vaala	64°30′07″N 26°45′36″E	
EFVP		Vampula Airfield	Huittinen (Vampula)	61°02′23″N 22°35′30″E	
EFVR	VRK	Varkaus Airport	Varkaus / Joroinen	62°10′16″N 27°52′07″E	
EFVT		Sulkaharju Airfield	Veteli	63°23′52″N 24°01′50″E	
EFWB		Wredeby Airfield	Kouvola (Anjalankoski)	60°39′49″N 26°44′45″E	
EFYL	YLI	Ylivieska Airport	Ylivieska	64°03′17″N 24°43′31″E	

== EG – United Kingdom (and British Crown dependencies) ==
Also see airport category and list.

Other categories: Airports in England, Airports in Northern Ireland, Airports in Scotland, Airports in Wales

ICAO	IATA	Airport name	Community	Region or territory	Coordinates	Notes
EGAA	BFS	Belfast International Airport	Aldergrove, near Belfast	Northern Ireland	54°39′27″N 6°12′57″E	
EGAB	ENK	Enniskillen/St Angelo Airport	Enniskillen	Northern Ireland	54°23′55″N 7°39′07″W	
EGAC	BHD	George Best Belfast City Airport	Belfast	Northern Ireland	54°37′05″N 5°52′21″W	
EGAD		Newtownards Airport	Newtownards	Northern Ireland	54°34′52″N 5°41′31″W	
EGAE	LDY	City of Derry Airport	Derry	Northern Ireland	55°02′34″N 7°09′43″W	
EGAL		RAF Langford Lodge			54°37′10″N 6°18′00″W	Closed
EGAR		Rothera Air Facility			67°34′04″S 68°07′40″W	
EGBB	BHX	Birmingham Airport	Birmingham	England	52°27′14″N 1°44′53″W	
EGBC		Cheltenham Racecourse Heliport	Cheltenham Racecourse	England	51°55′33″N 2°03′16″W	
EGBD		Derby Airfield	Derby	England	52°51′35″N 1°37′03″W	
EGBE	CVT	Coventry Airport	Coventry	England	52°22′21″N 1°28′47″W	
EGBF		Bedford Aerodrome	Thurleigh	England	52°14′01″N 0°26′29″W	
EGBG		Leicester Airport	Leicester	England	52°36′28″N 1°01′55″W	
EGBJ	GLO	Gloucestershire Airport	Staverton	England	51°53′39″N 2°10′02″W	
EGBK	ORM	Sywell Aerodrome	Northampton	England	52°18′22″N 0°47′32″W	
EGBL		RAF Long Marston			52°08′15″N 1°45′09″W	Closed
EGBM		Tatenhill Airfield	Tatenhill	England	52°48′51″N 1°45′53″W	
EGBN	NQT	Nottingham Airport	Nottingham	England	52°55′12″N 1°04′45″W	
EGBO		Wolverhampton Airport	Wolverhampton	England	52°31′04″N 2°15′35″W	
EGBP	GBA	Cotswold Airport	Kemble	England	51°40′05″N 2°03′25″W	
EGBS		Shobdon Aerodrome	Leominster	England	52°14′30″N 2°52′52″W	
EGBT		Turweston Aerodrome	Turweston	England	52°02′27″N 1°05′52″W	
EGBV		Silverstone Heliport	Silverstone	England	52°04′14″N 1°00′44″W	
EGBW		Wellesbourne Mountford Airfield	Wellesbourne	England	52°11′32″N 1°36′52″W	
EGCA		Coal Aston Airfield	Coal Aston	England	53°18′17″N 1°25′50″W	
EGCB		Manchester Barton Aerodrome	Manchester	England	53°28′18″N 2°23′23″W	
EGCC	MAN	Manchester Airport	Manchester	England	53°21′14″N 2°16′30″W	
EGCD		Woodford Aerodrome	Stockport	England	53°20′17″N 2°08′56″W	Closed 2012
EGCE		RAF Wrexham			53°04′00″N 2°57′01″W	Closed
EGCF		Sandtoft Airfield	Scunthorpe	England	53°33′35″N 0°51′30″W	
EGCG		Strubby Airfield	Strubby	England	53°18′40″N 0°10′26″E	
EGCI		Doncaster Airfield	Doncaster	England	53°30′50″N 1°06′36″W	Closed 1992
EGCJ		Sherburn-in-Elmet Airfield	Sherburn-in-Elmet	England	53°47′03″N 1°13′04″W	
EGCK		Caernarfon Airport	Caernarfon	Wales	53°06′06″N 4°20′15″W	
EGCL		Fenland Airfield	Spalding	England	52°44′22″N 0°01′48″W	
EGCM		Leeds East Airport	Church Fenton	England	53°50′04″N 1°11′44″W	
EGCN	DSA	Doncaster Sheffield Airport	South Yorkshire	England	53°28′31″N 1°00′15″W	
EGCP		Thorne			53°37′20″N 0°55′41″W	
EGCR		Ashcroft Airfield	Winsford	England	53°09′52″N 2°34′20″W	
EGCS		Sturgate Airfield	Lincoln	England	53°22′50″N 0°41′19″W	
EGCT		Tilstock			52°55′51″N 2°38′47″W	
EGCV		Sleap Airfield	Shrewsbury	England	52°50′05″N 2°46′13″W	
EGCW		Welshpool Airport	Welshpool	Wales	52°37′46″N 3°09′09″W	
EGDA		RAF Brawdy	Pembrokeshire	Wales	51°53′01″N 5°07′26″W	
EGDC		Royal Marines Base Chivenor	Braunton	England	51°05′14″N 4°09′01″W	
EGDD		Bicester Airfield	Oxfordshire	England	51°54′58″N 1°08′07″W	
EGDI		RAF Merryfield	Ilminster	England	50°57′52″N 2°56′19″W	
EGDJ	UPV	Upavon Airfield	Upavon	England	51°17′26″N 1°46′42″W	
EGDL	LYE	RAF Lyneham	Wiltshire	England	51°30′19″N 1°59′36″W	
EGDM		MoD Boscombe Down	Amesbury	England	51°09′27″N 1°44′49″W	
EGDN		Netheravon Airfield	Netheravon	England	51°14′43″N 1°45′32″W	
~~EGDO~~		~~RNAS Predannack~~ satellite of RNAS Culdrose	Mullion	England	49°59′57″N 5°13′50″W	
~~EGDP~~		~~RNAS/MCA Portland Heliport~~	Portland Harbour	England	50°34′08″N 2°27′02″W	closed 2014
EGDR		RNAS Culdrose	Helston	England	50°05′10″N 5°15′21″W	
EGDT		RAF Wroughton	Wroughton	England	51°30′25″N 1°48′07″E	
EGDV		Hullavington Airport	Hullavington	England	51°31′30″N 2°08′00″W	
EGDY	YEO	RNAS Yeovilton	Yeovil	England	51°00′31″N 2°38′16″W	
EGEA		Culter Helipad	Aberdeen	Scotland	57°07′11″N 2°19′22″W	
EGEC	CAL	Campbeltown Airport	Campbeltown	Scotland	55°26′15″N 5°41′17″W	formerly RAF Machrihanish - EGQJ
EGED	EOI	Eday Airport	Eday	Scotland	59°11′26″N 2°46′20″W	
EGEF	FIE	Fair Isle Airport	Fair Isle	Scotland	59°32′05″N 1°37′43″W	
EGEG		Glasgow City Heliport	Glasgow	Scotland	55°52′04″N 4°19′59″W	
EGEH	WHS	Whalsay Airport	Whalsay	Scotland	60°22′36″N 0°55′38″W	
EGEI		Broadford Airport	Breakish	Scotland	57°15′13″N 5°49′27″W	
EGEL	COL	Coll Airport	Coll	Scotland	56°36′07″N 6°37′04″W	
EGEN	NRL	North Ronaldsay Airport	North Ronaldsay	Scotland	59°22′03″N 2°26′04″W	
EGEO	OBN	Oban Airport	Oban	Scotland	56°27′49″N 5°24′00″W	
EGEP	PPW	Papa Westray Airport	Papa Westray	Scotland	59°21′04″N 2°54′01″W	
EGER	SOY	Stronsay Airport	Stronsay	Scotland	59°09′19″N 2°38′29″W	
EGES	NDY	Sanday Airport	Sanday	Scotland	59°15′01″N 2°34′36″W	
EGET	LWK	Tingwall Airport	Lerwick	Scotland	60°11′31″N 1°14′37″W	
EGEW	WRY	Westray Airport	Westray	Scotland	59°21′00″N 2°57′01″W	
EGEY	CSA	Colonsay Airport	Colonsay	Scotland	56°03′27″N 6°14′35″W	
EGFA		Aberporth Airport	Cardigan	Wales	52°06′53″N 4°33′34″W	
EGFC		Cardiff Heliport	Cardiff	Wales	51°28′03″N 3°08′15″W	
EGFD		Llanbedr Airport	Llanbedr	Wales	52°48′18″N 4°07′38″W	
EGFE	HAW	Haverfordwest Aerodrome	Haverfordwest	Wales	51°49′59″N 4°57′40″W	
EGFF	CWL	Cardiff International Airport	Cardiff	Wales	51°23′48″N 3°20′36″W	
EGFH	SWS	Swansea Airport	Swansea	Wales	51°36′19″N 4°04′04″W	
EGFP		Pembrey Airport	Pembrey	Wales	51°42′50″N 4°18′44″W	
EGGD	BRS	Bristol Airport	Bristol	England	51°22′58″N 2°43′09″W	
EGGP	LPL	Liverpool John Lennon Airport	Liverpool	England	53°20′01″N 2°50′59″W	
EGGW	LTN	London Luton Airport	London	England	51°52′29″N 0°22′06″W	
EGHA		Compton Abbas Airfield	Shaftesbury	England	50°58′02″N 2°09′13″W	
~~EGHB~~		~~Maypole Airfield~~	Maypole, Kent	England	51°20′18″N 1°09′25″E	closed 2021
EGHC	LEQ	Land's End Airport	St Just in Penwith	England	50°06′10″N 5°40′14″W	
EGHD	PLH	Plymouth City Airport	Plymouth	England	50°25′22″N 4°06′21″W	closed 2011
EGHE	ISC	St. Mary's Airport	St. Mary's	England	49°54′48″N 6°17′30″W	
EGHF		Solent Airport Daedalus	Lee-on-the-Solent	England	50°48′54″N 1°12′16″W	was RNAS Lee-on-Solent (HMS Daedalus)
EGHG		Yeovil/Westland Airport	Yeovil	England	50°56′24″N 2°39′31″W	
EGHH	BOH	Bournemouth Airport	Bournemouth	England	50°46′48″N 1°50′33″W	
EGHI	SOU	Southampton Airport	Southampton	England	50°57′01″N 1°21′24″W	
EGHJ	BBP	Bembridge Airport	Sandown	England	50°40′41″N 1°06′34″W	
EGHK	PZE	Penzance Heliport	Penzance	England	50°07′49″N 5°30′50″W	
EGHL	QLA	Lasham Airfield	Basingstoke	England	51°11′14″N 1°02′01″W	
EGHM		Hamble		England	50°52′05″N 1°19′16″W	
EGHN		Isle of Wight/Sandown Airport	Sandown	England	50°39′11″N 1°10′56″W	
EGHO		Thruxton Aerodrome	Andover	England	51°12′38″N 1°36′00″W	
EGHP		Popham Airfield	Popham	England	51°11′40″N 1°14′10″W	
EGHQ	NQY	Newquay Airport	St Mawgan, Cornwall	England	50°26′27″N 4°59′43″W	
EGHR		Chichester/Goodwood Airfield	Westhampnett, Chichester	England	50°51′34″N 0°45′33″W	
EGHS		Henstridge Airfield	Henstridge	England	50°58′59″N 2°21′17″W	
EGHT		Tresco Heliport	Tresco	England	49°56′44″N 6°19′53″W	
EGHU		Eaglescott Airfield	Great Torrington	England	50°55′43″N 3°59′22″W	
EGHY		Truro Aerodrome	Truro	England	50°16′43″N 5°08′33″W	
EGJA	ACI	Alderney Airport	Alderney	Channel Islands	49°42′24″N 2°12′52″W	
EGJB	GCI	Guernsey Airport	Guernsey	Channel Islands	49°26′05″N 2°36′07″W	
EGJJ	JER	Jersey Airport	Jersey	Channel Islands	49°12′29″N 2°11′43″W	
EGKA	ESH	Brighton City Airport	Shoreham-by-Sea	England	50°50′08″N 0°17′50″W	
EGKB	BQH	London Biggin Hill Airport	London	England	51°19′51″N 0°01′57″E	
EGKC		LEC Airfield (Bognor Regis)	West Sussex	England	50°48′04″N 0°39′34″W	
EGKD		Albourne			50°55′41″N 0°12′43″E	
EGKE		Challock Airport	Challock	England	51°12′30″N 0°49′45″E	
~~EGKF~~		~~RNAS Ford~~	Ford	England	50°49′02″N 0°35′25″W	closed 1958
EGKG		Goodwood Racecourse Heliport	Goodwood Racecourse	England	50°54′01″N 0°44′13″W	
EGKH		Headcorn Aerodrome	Maidstone	England	51°09′24″N 0°38′33″E	
EGKK	LGW	London Gatwick Airport	London	England	51°08′53″N 0°11′25″W	
EGKL		Deanland	Lewes	England	50°52′50″N 0°09′09″E	was RAF Deanland
EGKR	KRH	Redhill Aerodrome	Redhill	England	51°12′49″N 0°08′19″W	
EGLA		Bodmin Airfield	Bodmin	England	50°29′59″N 4°39′57″W	
EGLB		Brooklands			51°20′56″N 0°28′21″W	
EGLC	LCY	London City Airport	London	England	51°30′19″N 0°03′19″E	
EGLD		Denham Aerodrome	Gerrards Cross	England	51°35′18″N 0°30′47″W	
EGLF	FAB	Farnborough Airport	Farnborough	England	51°16′31″N 0°46′39″W	
~~EGLG~~		~~Panshanger Airport~~	Hertford	England	51°48′07″N 0°09′30″W	closed 2014; proposed reopening
EGLJ		Chalgrove Airfield	Oxford	England	51°40′28″N 1°05′07″W	
EGLK	BBS	Blackbushe Airport	Camberley	England	51°19′26″N 0°50′51″W	
EGLL	LHR	London Heathrow Airport	London	England	51°28′39″N 0°27′41″W	
EGLM		White Waltham Airfield	White Waltham	England	51°30′03″N 0°46′28″W	
EGLP		Brimpton (Wasing Lower Farm)	Upper Bucklebury	England	51°23′01″N 1°10′20″W	
EGLS		Old Sarum Airfield	Salisbury	England	51°05′56″N 1°47′03″W	
EGLT		Ascot Racecourse Heliport	Ascot Racecourse	England	51°25′02″N 0°40′24″W	
EGLW		London Heliport	London	England	51°28′12″N 0°10′46″W	
EGMA		Fowlmere Airfield	Cambridge	England	52°04′57″N 0°03′31″E	
EGMC	SEN	London Southend Airport	Southend-on-Sea	England	51°34′13″N 0°41′36″E	
EGMD	LYX	Lydd Airport	Lydd	England	50°57′22″N 0°56′21″E	
EGMF		Farthing Corner	Rainham	England	51°19′57″N 0°36′00″E	
EGMH	MSE	Kent International Airport	Ramsgate	England	51°20′32″N 1°20′46″E	
EGMJ		Little Gransden Airfield	St Neots	England	52°09′59″N 0°09′08″W	
~~EGMK~~	~~LYM~~	~~Lympne Airport~~	Lympne, Kent	England	51°05′00″N 1°01′00″E	
EGML		Damyns Hall Aerodrome	Upminster	England	51°31′43″N 0°14′44″E	
EGMT		Thurrock Aerodrome	Thurrock	England	51°32′15″N 0°22′03″E	
EGNA		Hucknall Airfield	Nottingham	England	53°00′52″N 1°13′06″W	
EGNB		Brough Aerodrome	Brough	England	53°43′11″N 0°33′59″W	
EGNC	CAX	Carlisle Lake District Airport	Carlisle	England	54°56′15″N 2°48′33″W	
EGND		Crosland Moor Airfield	Brough	England	53°37′16″N 1°49′54″W	
EGNE	RGA	Gamston Airport	Retford	England	53°16′50″N 0°57′05″W	
EGNF		Netherthorpe Airfield	Worksop	England	53°19′01″N 1°11′47″W	
EGNG		Bagby Airfield	Bagby	England	54°12′44″N 1°17′30″E	
EGNH	BLK	Blackpool International Airport	Blackpool	England	53°46′18″N 3°01′43″W	
EGNI		Skegness (Ingoldmells)			53°10′18″N 0°19′46″E	
EGNJ	HUY	Humberside Airport	Kingston upon Hull	England	53°34′28″N 0°21′03″W	
EGNL	BWF	Walney Aerodrome	Barrow-in-Furness	England	54°07′43″N 3°16′03″W	
EGNM	LBA	Leeds Bradford Airport	West Yorkshire	England	53°51′58″N 1°39′39″W	
EGNO	WRT	Warton Aerodrome	Warton, Lancashire	England	53°44′42″N 2°53′02″W	
EGNP		Leeds Heliport	Leeds	England	53°52′41″N 1°39′40″W	
EGNR	CEG	Hawarden Airport	Chester	England	53°10′41″N 2°58′40″W	
EGNS	IOM	Isle of Man Airport	Isle of Man		54°05′00″N 4°37′24″W	
EGNT	NCL	Newcastle Airport	Newcastle upon Tyne	England	55°02′17″N 1°41′23″W	
EGNU		Full Sutton Airfield	York	England	53°58′50″N 0°51′53″W	
EGNV	MME	Teesside International Airport	Tees Valley	England	54°30′33″N 1°25′46″W	
EGNW		Wickenby Aerodrome	Lincoln	England	53°19′01″N 0°20′56″W	
EGNX	EMA	East Midlands Airport	East Midlands	England	52°49′48″N 1°19′56″W	
EGNY		Beverley/Linley Hill Airfield	Beverley	England	53°53′54″N 0°21′41″W	
EGOB		RAF Burtonwood			53°24′50″N 2°39′04″W	
EGOC		RAF Bishops Court			54°18′20″N 5°34′09″W	
EGOE		RAF Ternhill	Ternhill	England	52°52′16″N 2°32′01″W	
EGOJ		RAF Jurby Head			54°21′06″N 4°32′57″W	
EGOM		RAF Spadeadam			55°01′30″N 2°36′08″W	
EGOQ		RAF Mona	Anglesey	Wales	53°15′31″N 4°22′25″W	
EGOS		RAF Shawbury	Shawbury	England	52°47′53″N 2°40′05″W	
EGOV	VLY	RAF Valley/Anglesey Airport	Anglesey	Wales	53°14′53″N 4°32′07″W	
EGOW		RAF Woodvale	Formby	England	53°34′54″N 3°03′20″W	
EGOY		RAF West Freugh			54°50′50″N 4°56′54″W	
EGPA	KOI	Kirkwall Airport	Kirkwall	Scotland	58°57′29″N 2°54′02″W	
EGPB	LSI	Sumburgh Airport	Sumburgh	Scotland	59°52′53″N 1°17′38″W	
EGPC	WIC	Wick Airport	Wick	Scotland	58°27′32″N 3°05′35″W	
EGPD	ABZ	Aberdeen Airport	Aberdeen	Scotland	57°12′09″N 2°11′53″W	
EGPE	INV	Inverness Airport	Inverness	Scotland	57°32′33″N 4°02′51″W	
EGPF	GLA	Glasgow Airport	Glasgow	Scotland	57°32′33″N 4°02′51″W	
EGPG		Cumbernauld Airport	Cumbernauld	Scotland	55°58′29″N 3°58′32″W	
EGPH	EDI	Edinburgh Airport	Edinburgh	Scotland	55°57′00″N 3°22′21″W	
EGPI	ILY	Islay Airport	Islay	Scotland	55°41′00″N 6°15′35″W	
EGPJ		Fife Airport	Glenrothes	Scotland	56°11′00″N 3°13′13″W	
EGPK	PIK	Glasgow Prestwick International Airport	Glasgow	Scotland	55°30′34″N 4°35′40″W	
EGPL	BEB	Benbecula Airport	Benbecula	Scotland	57°28′52″N 7°21′46″W	
EGPM	SCS	Scatsta Airport	Lerwick	Scotland	60°25′58″N 1°17′46″W	
EGPN	DND	Dundee Airport	Dundee	Scotland	56°27′09″N 3°01′33″W	
EGPO	SYY	Stornoway Airport	Stornoway	Scotland	58°12′56″N 6°19′52″W	
EGPR	BRR	Barra Airport	Barra	Scotland	57°01′22″N 7°26′35″W	
EGPS		Peterhead/Longside Heliport			57°31′01″N 1°52′30″W	
EGPT	PSL	Perth Airport (Scotland)	Perth	Scotland	56°26′28″N 3°22′26″W	
EGPU	TRE	Tiree Airport	Tiree	Scotland	56°29′57″N 6°52′09″W	
EGPW	UNT	Unst Airport	Shetland Islands	Scotland	60°44′49″N 0°51′17″W	
~~EGPY~~		~~RAF Dounreay~~	North Scotland	Scotland	58°35′00″N 3°43′40″W	
EGQA		Tain			57°48′40″N 3°58′24″W	
~~EGQB~~		~~RAF Ballykelly~~		Scotland	55°03′16″N 7°01′12″W	
EGQK	FSS	RAF Kinloss	Kinloss	Scotland	57°38′58″N 3°33′38″W	
EGQL	ADX	RAF Leuchars	Leuchars	Scotland	56°22′23″N 2°52′07″W	
EGQM		RAF Boulmer	Alnwick	England	55°25′19″N 1°36′12″W	
EGQS	LMO	RAF Lossiemouth	Lossiemouth	Scotland	57°42′19″N 3°20′21″W	
EGSA		Shipdham Airfield	Shipdham	England	52°37′46″N 0°55′41″E	formerly RAF Shipdham
EGSB		Castle Mill Airfield	Bedford	England	52°08′35″N 0°24′17″W	
EGSC	CBG	Cambridge City Airport	Cambridge	England	52°12′18″N 0°10′30″E	
EGSD		Great Yarmouth – North Denes Airport	Great Yarmouth	England	52°38′11″N 1°43′23″E	
~~EGSE~~	~~IPW~~	~~Ipswich Airport~~	Ipswich	England	52°01′51″N 1°11′41″E	closed 1998
EGSF		Peterborough Business Airport	Peterborough	England	52°28′05″N 0°15′03″W	
EGSG		Stapleford Aerodrome	Romford	England	51°39′09″N 0°09′22″E	
EGSH	NWI	Norwich International Airport	Norwich	England	52°40′33″N 1°16′58″E	
EGSI		Marshland Airfield			52°38′37″N 0°17′42″E	
EGSJ		Seething Airfield	Norwich	England	52°30′40″N 1°25′02″E	
~~EGSK~~		~~Hethel Airfield~~	Hethel	England	52°33′52″N 1°10′15″E	closed 1948
EGSL		Andrewsfield Aerodrome	Braintree	England	51°53′42″N 0°26′57″E	
EGSM		Beccles Airport	Beccles	England	52°26′07″N 1°37′06″E	
EGSN		Bourn Airfield	Cambridge	England	52°12′38″N 0°02′33″W	
EGSO		Crowfield Airfield	Ipswich	England	52°10′17″N 1°06′36″E	
EGSP		Peterborough/Sibson Airfield	Peterborough	England	52°33′21″N 0°23′11″W	
EGSQ		Clacton Airport	Clacton-on-Sea	England	51°47′06″N 1°07′48″E	
EGSR		Earls Colne Airfield	Halstead	England	51°54′52″N 0°40′57″E	
EGSS	STN	London Stansted Airport	London	England	51°53′06″N 0°14′06″E	
EGST		Elmsett Airport	Ipswich	England	52°04′32″N 0°58′41″E	
EGSU		Duxford Aerodrome	Cambridge	England	52°05′27″N 0°07′55″E	
EGSV		Old Buckenham Airport	Norwich	England	52°29′51″N 1°03′07″E	
EGSW		Newmarket Heath Airfield			52°14′08″N 0°21′01″E	
EGSX		North Weald Airfield	North Weald	England	51°43′18″N 0°09′15″E	
EGSY		MoD Saint Athan	St Athan	Wales	51°24′17″N 3°26′09″W	formerly Sheffield City Airport until 2008; code reassigned April 2019
~~EGTA~~		~~Aylesbury Thame Airfield~~	Aylesbury	England	51°46′33″N 0°56′25″W	
EGTB	HYC	Wycombe Air Park/Booker Airport	High Wycombe	England	51°36′42″N 0°48′30″W	
EGTC		Cranfield Airport	Cranfield	England	52°04′20″N 0°37′00″W	
EGTD		Dunsfold Aerodrome	Dunsfold	England	51°06′54″N 0°31′57″W	
EGTE	EXT	Exeter Airport	Exeter	England	50°44′04″N 3°24′50″W	
EGTF		Fairoaks Airport	Chobham	England	51°20′53″N 0°33′31″W	
~~EGTG~~	~~FZO~~	~~Bristol Filton Airport~~	Filton	England	51°31′10″N 2°35′37″W	closed 2012
EGTH		Old Warden Aerodrome	Old Warden, Bedfordshire	England	52°05′12″N 0°19′07″W	reallocated from Hatfield Aerodrome
~~EGTI~~		~~Leavesden Aerodrome~~	Watford	England	51°41′24″N 0°25′08″W	closed 1990s
EGTK	OXF	Oxford Airport	Oxford	England	51°50′13″N 1°19′12″W	
EGTN		Enstone Airfield	Enstone	England	51°55′47″N 1°25′39″W	
EGTO	RCS	Rochester Airport, England	Rochester	England	51°21′07″N 0°30′10″E	
EGTP		Perranporth Airfield	Perranporth	England	50°19′50″N 5°10′46″W	
EGTR		Elstree Airfield	Watford	England	51°39′21″N 0°19′33″W	
EGTU		Dunkeswell Aerodrome	Honiton	England	50°51′36″N 3°14′05″W	
EGTW		Oaksey Park Airport	Oaksey	England	51°37′56″N 2°00′53″W	
~~EGUA~~		~~RAF Upper Heyford~~	Oxfordshire	England	51°56′13″N 1°15′12″W	closed 1993
EGUB	BEX	RAF Benson	Benson	England	51°36′59″N 1°05′45″W	
EGUD	ABB	RAF Abingdon	Abingdon	England	51°41′27″N 1°19′00″W	
EGUK		RAF Waterbeach		England	52°16′28″N 0°11′24″E	
EGUL	LKZ	RAF Lakenheath	Lakenheath	England	52°24′30″N 0°33′24″E	
EGUN	MHZ	RAF Mildenhall	Mildenhall	England	52°21′54″N 0°28′51″E	
EGUO		Colerne Airfield	Colerne	England	51°26′21″N 2°17′11″W	
~~EGUP~~		~~RAF Sculthorpe~~	Fakenham	England	52°50′54″N 0°45′38″E	closed in the 1990s
EGUU		RAF Uxbridge			51°32′32″N 0°28′11″W	
EGUW		Wattisham Flying Station	Stowmarket	England	52°07′37″N 0°57′21″E	
EGUY	QUY	RAF Wyton	St Ives	England	52°21′26″N 0°06′28″W	
EGVA	FFD	RAF Fairford	Fairford	England	51°40′56″N 1°47′24″W	
EGVB		RAF Bawdsey			51°59′32″N 1°24′10″E	
EGVF		Fleetlands Heliport			50°50′05″N 1°10′06″W	
EGVG		RAF Woodbridge			52°05′16″N 1°24′03″E	
EGVH		RAF Credenhill (RAF Hereford)			52°05′06″N 2°47′42″W	
EGVI		RAF Greenham Common			51°22′43″N 1°16′56″W	
EGVJ		RAF Bentwaters			52°07′41″N 1°26′07″E	
EGVL		RAF Little Rissington	Upper Rissington	England	51°52′00″N 1°41′49″W	
EGVN	BZZ	RAF Brize Norton	Brize Norton	England	51°45′00″N 1°35′01″W	
EGVO	ODH	RAF Odiham	Odiham	England	51°14′03″N 0°56′34″W	
EGVP		AAC Middle Wallop	Andover	England	51°08′56″N 1°34′12″W	
EGVW		RAE Bedford			52°13′47″N 0°28′29″W	
~~EGWA~~	~~ADV~~	~~RAF Andover~~	Andover	England	51°12′31″N 1°31′31″W	closed in the 2000s
EGWC		RAF Cosford	Albrighton	England	52°38′42″N 2°15′20″W	
EGWE		RAF Henlow	Henlow	England	52°00′56″N 0°18′12″W	
EGWL		RAF North Luffenham			52°37′56″N 0°36′38″W	
EGWN		RAF Halton	Halton	England	51°47′30″N 0°44′10″W	
EGWR		RAF Croughton			51°59′15″N 1°11′10″W	
EGWU	NHT	RAF Northolt	Ruislip	England	51°33′11″N 0°25′06″W	
EGWZ		RAF Alconbury			52°21′48″N 0°13′22″W	
EGXB		RAF Binbrook			53°26′45″N 0°12′32″W	
EGXC	QCY	RAF Coningsby	Coningsby	England	53°05′35″N 0°09′58″W	
EGXD		RAF Dishforth	North Yorkshire	England	54°08′14″N 1°25′13″W	
EGXE		RAF Leeming	Leeming Bar	England	54°17′33″N 1°32′08″W	
EGXG		RAF Church Fenton	Church Fenton	England	53°50′04″N 1°11′44″W	
EGXH	BEQ	RAF Honington	Thetford	England	52°20′33″N 0°46′23″E	
EGXI		RAF Finningley			53°28′47″N 1°00′39″W	
~~EGXJ~~		~~RAF Cottesmore~~	Rutland	England	52°43′46″N 0°39′05″W	closed 2012
~~EGXN~~		~~RAF Newton~~			52°57′59″N 0°59′22″W	
EGXP	SQZ	RAF Scampton	Scampton	England	53°18′28″N 0°33′03″W	
EGXT		RAF Wittering	Stamford	England	52°36′45″N 0°28′35″W	
~~EGXU~~	~~HRT~~	~~RAF Linton-on-Ouse~~	Linton-on-Ouse	England	54°02′56″N 1°15′10″W	
~~EGXV~~		~~RAF Leconfield~~		England	53°52′37″N 0°26′15″W	
EGXW	WTN	RAF Waddington	Waddington	England	53°10′21″N 0°31′51″W	
~~EGXX~~		~~RAF Donna Nook~~		England	53°28′29″N 0°09′07″E	
EGXY		RAF Syerston	Newark-on-Trent	England	53°01′24″N 0°54′42″W	
EGXZ		RAF Topcliffe	Topcliffe	England	54°12′20″N 1°22′56″W	
~~EGYC~~	~~CLF~~	~~RAF Coltishall~~	Norwich	England	52°45′17″N 1°21′26″E	closed 2006
EGYD		RAF Cranwell	Cranwell	England	53°01′49″N 0°29′00″W	
EGYE		RAF Barkston Heath	Grantham	England	52°57′44″N 0°33′42″W	
EGYH		RAF Holbeach	Dawsmere	England	52°51′17″N 0°10′15″E	
EGYK		RAF Elvington	Elvington	England	53°55′28″N 0°58′16″W	
EGYM	KNF	RAF Marham	Marham	England	52°38′54″N 0°33′02″E	
