= EGCR =

EGCR may refer to:

- Croydon Airport (IATA code: EGCR), a former airport in South London, England
- Ashcroft Airfield (IATA code: EGCR), an airport in Winsford, England
- Experimental Gas Cooled Reactor, a nuclear reactor constructed but never operated by the Oak Ridge National Laboratory, Tennessee, U.S.
