= Tõutsi Airfield =

Airfield in Estonia

Tõutsi Airfield Tõutsi lennuväli
- IATA: none; ICAO: EETI

Summary
- Owner: Joosti Puhkemaja
- Coordinates: 57°57′21″N 26°28′33″E

Maps
- Location in Estonia
- Location in Tõutsi

Runways
Direction	Length		Surface
Direction	m	ft	Surface
	700	2,297	Grass

Tõutsi Airfield (Estonian: Tõutsi lennuväli; ICAO: EETI) is an airfield in Tõutsi, Valga County, Estonia.

The airfield's owner is Joosti Puhkemaja.
