= AZ Groeninge Heliport =

Kortrijk/AZ Groeninge Heliport
- IATA: none; ICAO: EBKG

Summary
- Airport type: Private
- Operator: AZ Groeninge
- Location: Belgium
- Coordinates: 50°48′10″N 003°15′50″E

Map
- Location in Belgium

Helipads
Number	Length		Surface
Number	m	ft	Surface
1	21	69	Concrete
- Sources: Belgian AIP

Kortrijk/AZ Groeninge Heliport (ICAO: EBKG) is a heliport serving AZ Groeninge located in Kortrijk, West Flanders, Belgium.

== See also ==
- List of airports in Belgium
- List of airports by ICAO code: EB-EG
