= Vormsi Airfield =

Airfield in Estonia

Coordinates: 58°59′04″N 023°15′08″E

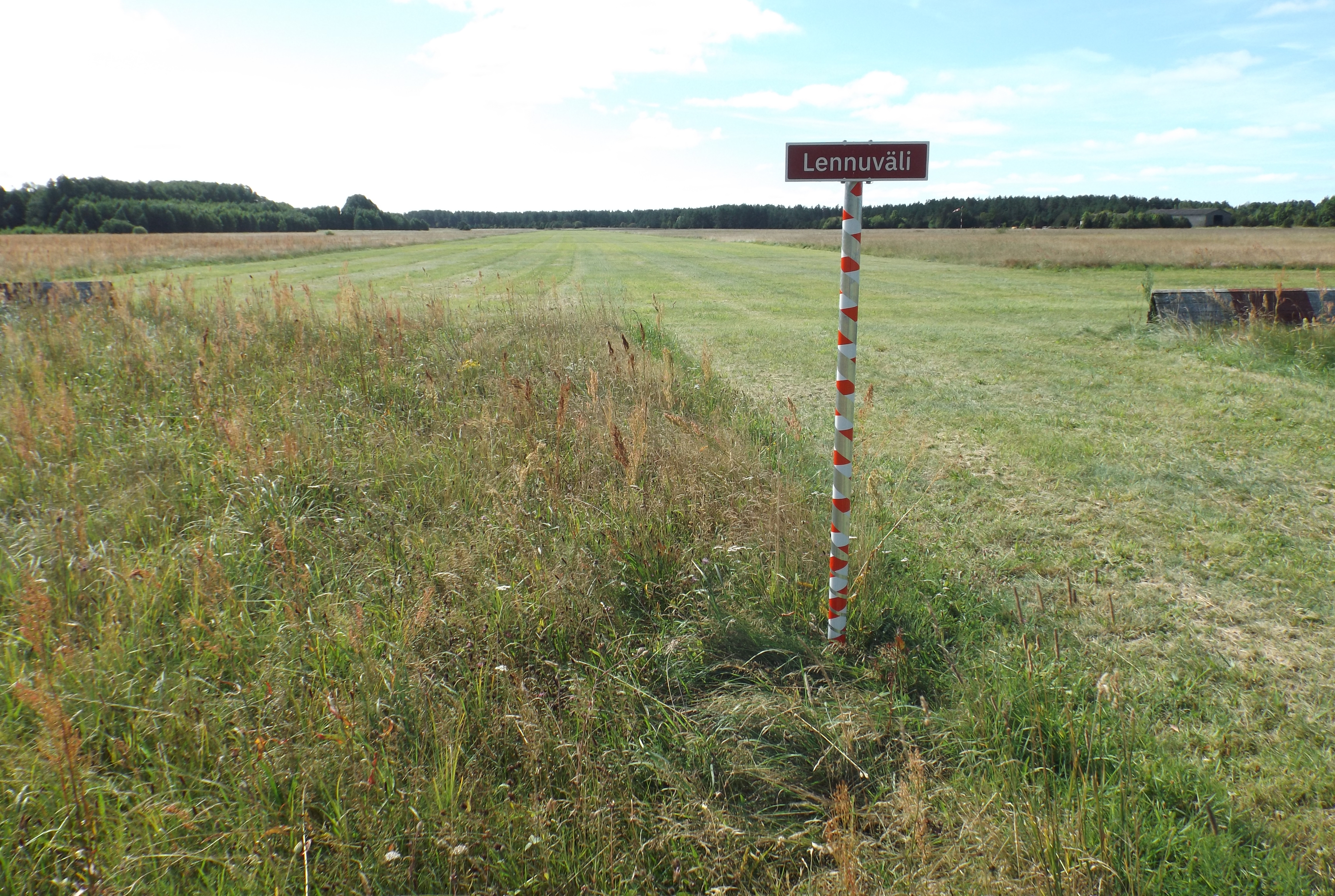

Vormsi Airfield (Estonian: Vormsi lennuväli; ICAO: EEVO) is an airfield in Vormsi, Lääne County, Estonia.

The airfield's owner is the aviation club Aero Vormsi Klubi.
