= Kitzingen Airport =

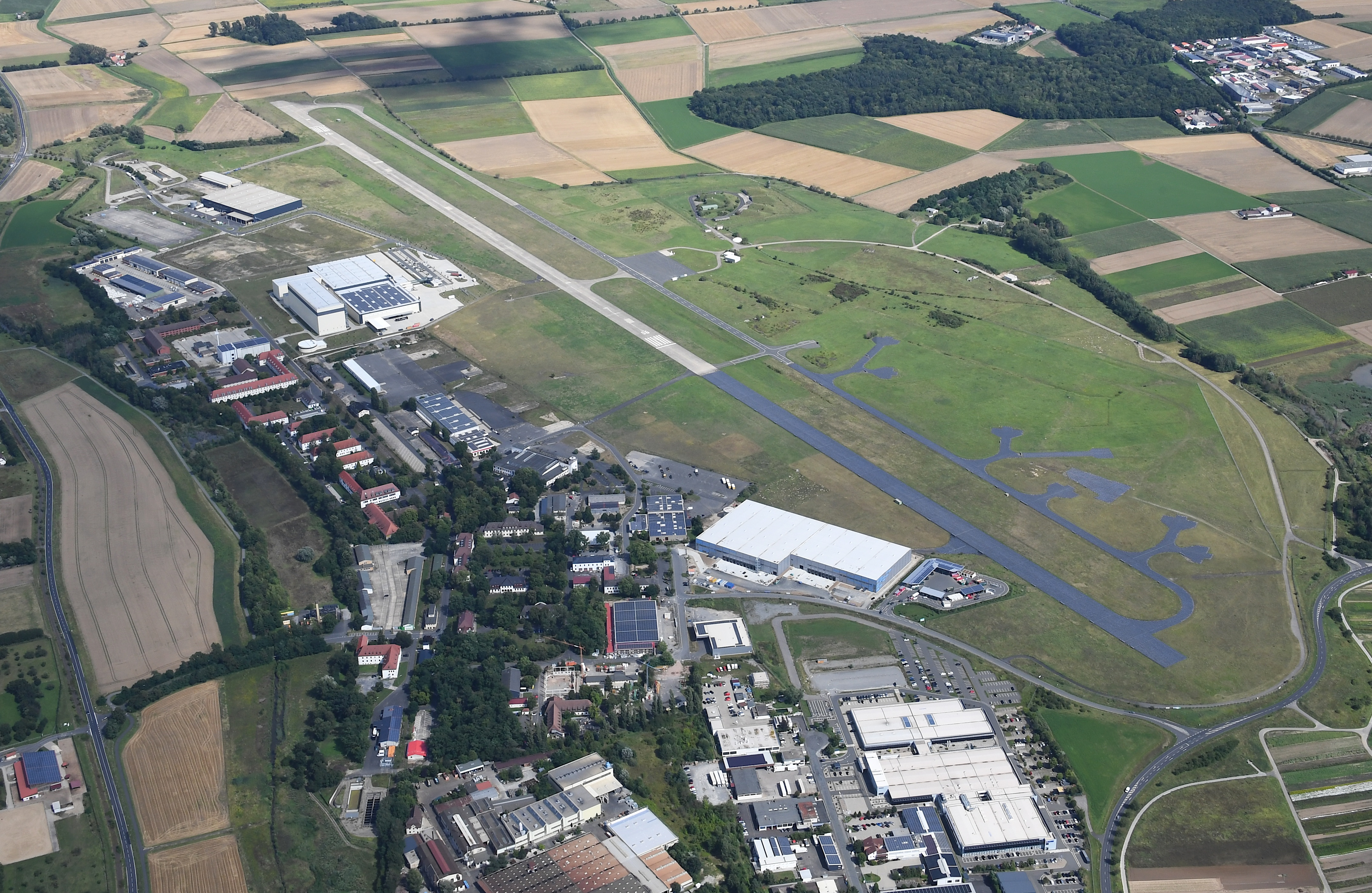
- IATA: KZG; ICAO: EDGY

Summary
- Airport type: Civil
- Location: Kitzingen, Germany
- Elevation AMSL: 689 ft / 210 m
- Coordinates: 49°44′34″N 010°12′09″E

Map

Runways
Direction	Length		Surface
Direction	m	ft	Surface
07/25	2,130	7,000	Asphalt

For the military use of this facility prior to 2007, see Kitzingen Army Airfield

Kitzingen Airport (IATA: KZG, ICAO: EDGY) is a general aviation airport located in Germany, about 3 kilometres north-east of Kitzingen, Bavaria.

The airport was opened as a private, general aviation facility after the closure of the United States Army Kitzingen Army Airfield in March 2007. It offers private aircraft and charter operations.
