= Breakish =

Breakish may refer to:

- Lower Breakish, Isle of Skye, Scotland
- Upper Breakish, Isle of Skye, Scotland
