= Crowfield Airfield =

Private airfield in Suffolk, England

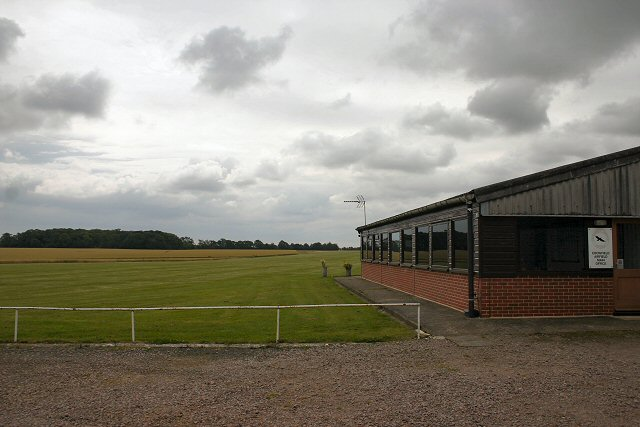
- IATA: ESH; ICAO: EGSO

Summary
- Airport type: Private (unlicensed)
- Location: 9 9 miles (14 km) north-west of Ipswich, Suffolk, England
- Elevation AMSL: 201 ft / 62 m
- Coordinates: 52°10′17″N 1°6′36″E
- Website: crowfieldairfield.co.uk

Map
- Location in Suffolk

Runways
| Direction | Length | | Surface |
| Direction | m | ft | Surface |
|---|---|---|---|
| 13/31 | 740 | 2,428 | Grass |
| 02/20 | 550 | 1,804 | Grass |
- Sources: http://www.crowfieldairfield.co.uk/

Crowfield Airfield (ICAO: EGSO) is a privately owned airfield located in Suffolk in the east of England. It has 2 grass runways.

Crowfield Airfield has been placed under the following restrictions:

- Not more than 20 aircraft movements on any one day,
- Single engine aircraft only with 148 kW and 1200 kg limit
- No gliders
- No microlights
- No helicopters
- No parachuting
- No aerobatics
