= Hanko Airfield =

Hanko Airfield Hangon lentokenttä Hangö flygfält
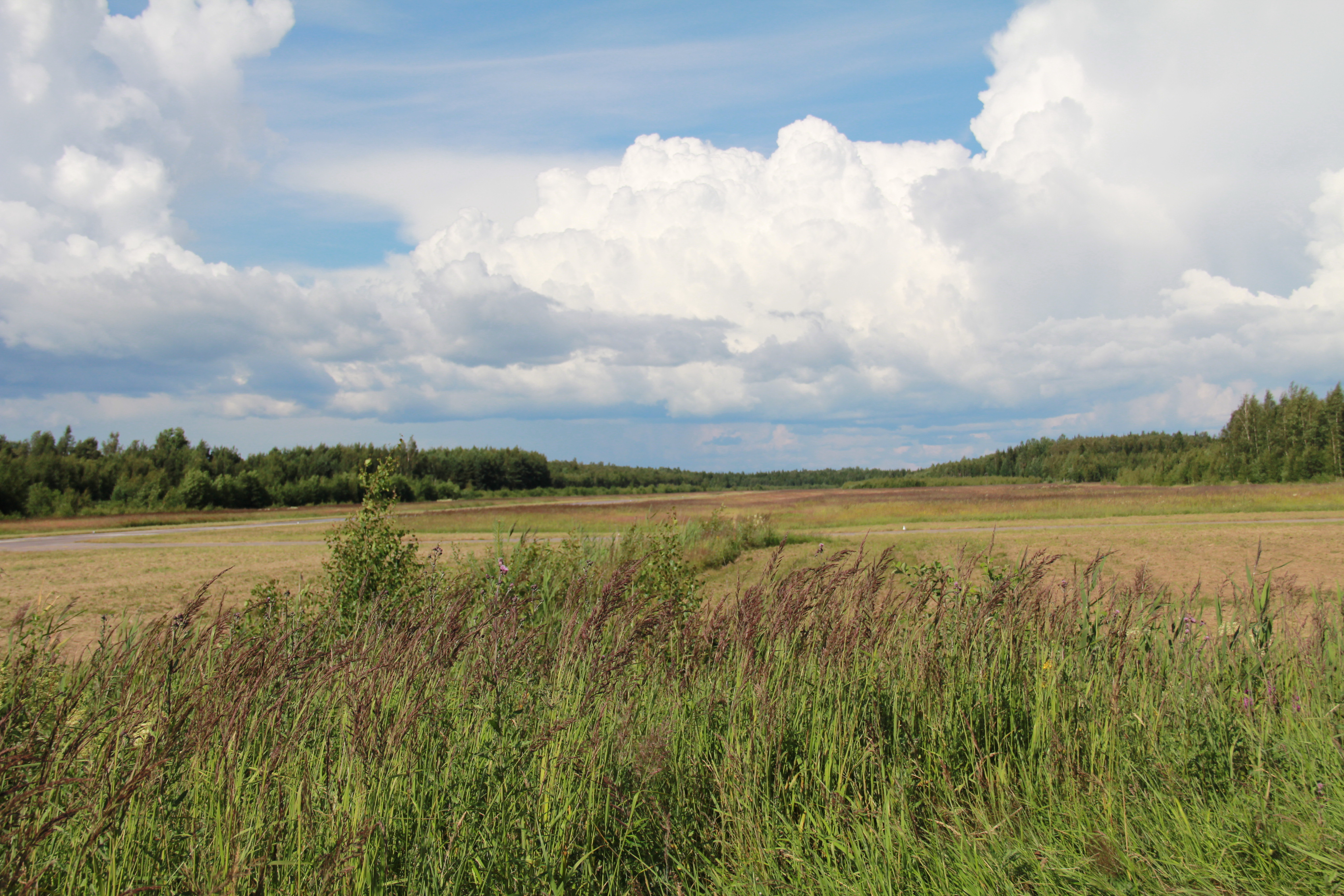
- IATA: none; ICAO: EFHN

Summary
- Operator: Hangon Lentokerho ry
- Location: Hanko, Finland
- Elevation AMSL: 20 ft / 6 m
- Coordinates: 59°50′44″N 023°04′56″E
- Website: hangonlentokerho.fi

Map
- Location within Finland

Runways
Direction	Length		Surface
Direction	m	ft	Surface
03/21	1,600	5,249	asphalt/grass
- Source: VFR Finland

Hanko Airfield is the southernmost airfield in Finland. It is located in Hanko, about 8 kilometres (5 mi) east of Hanko city centre.

The airfield has a single runway, oriented 03/21 with a total length of 1,600 m (5,249 ft), and is mostly used for recreational aviation by the local Hangon Lentokerho flying club.

== See also ==
- List of airports in Finland
