= Humala Airfield =

Airfield in Estonia

Humala Airfield Humala lennuväli
- IATA: none; ICAO: EEHA

Summary
- Owner: Urmas Sepp
- Coordinates: 59°21′21″N 24°22′35″E

Maps
- Location in Estonia
- Location in Humala, Estonia

Runways
Direction	Length		Surface
Direction	ft	m	Surface
			Asphalt/concrete

Humala Airfield (Estonian: Humala lennuväli; ICAO: EEHA) is an airfield in Humala, Harju County, Estonia.

The airfield's owner is Urmas Sepp.
