= Maubray Airfield =

- IATA: none; ICAO: EBTY

Summary
- Airport type: Private
- Operator: Tournai Air Club
- Serves: Tournai
- Location: Wallonia, Belgium
- Elevation AMSL: 161 ft / 49 m
- Coordinates: 50°31′47″N 003°29′40″E
- Website: www.tournai-air-club.eu

Maps
- Location in Belgium
- Interactive map of Maubray Airfield

Runways
Direction	Length		Surface
Direction	m	ft	Surface
11/29	640	2,100	Grass
- Sources: Belgian AIP

Maubray Airfield (ICAO: EBTY) is a private airfield located near Tournai, Hainaut, Wallonia (southern Belgium). It mainly serves glider flying by the local aeroclub.

== See also ==
- List of airports in Belgium
