= Antsla Airfield =

Airfield in Estonia

Antsla Airfield Antsla lennuväli
- IATA: none; ICAO: none

Summary
- Owner: Virge Ventsel
- Coordinates: 57°49′40″N 26°29′40″E

Maps
- Location in Estonia
- Interactive map of Antsla Airfield

Runways
Direction	Length		Surface
Direction	ft	m	Surface
			grass

Antsla Airfield (Estonian: Antsla lennuväli) is a private airfield in Antsla, Võru County, Estonia.

The airfield is covered with grass. The airfield's owner is Virge Ventsel.
