= Amougies Airfield =

Amougies Airfield Aérodrome d'Amougies
- IATA: none; ICAO: EBAM

Summary
- Airport type: Private
- Owner: JMB Aviation
- Location: Amougies Mont-de-l'Enclus, Wallonia, Belgium
- Elevation AMSL: 41 ft / 12 m
- Coordinates: 50°44′22″N 003°29′10″E
- Website: www.airport-amougies.be

Map
- Location in Belgium

Runways
Direction	Length		Surface
Direction	m	ft	Surface
11/29	610	2,001	Grass
- Sources: Belgian AIP

Amougies Airfield (ICAO: EBAM) (French: aérodrome d'Amougies) is a small airfield just south of the Kluisberg, in Amougies, part of the Walloon municipality of Mont-de-l'Enclus, Hainaut, Belgium.

As of 2010, it only hosts Ultralight aviation (ULM) operations. Visiting pilots should carefully respect noise abatement procedures.

From 24 to 28 October 1969 the small village of Amougies nearby was the venue for the Festival Actuel. Billed as "60 Heures de Musique: 50 Francs", the concert featured such performers as Yes, Pink Floyd, Ten Years After, Caravan and Pretty Things, with headline act Frank Zappa.
