= Jõhvi Airfield =

Airport in Estonia

Coordinates: 59°19′33″N 027°23′33″E

Jõhvi Airfield (Estonian: Jõhvi lennuväli; ICAO: EEJI) is an airfield in Jõhvi, Ida-Viru County, Estonia.

The airfield's owner is Foundation Jõhvi Lennuväli.
