= Hoevenen Airfield =

Airfield

Hoevenen Airfield Vliegveld Hoevenen
- IATA: none; ICAO: EBHN

Summary
- Airport type: Private
- Operator: Vliegclub Hoevenen
- Location: Hoevenen (Stabroek)
- Elevation AMSL: 10 ft / 3 m
- Coordinates: 51°18′19″N 004°23′26″E
- Website: www.ebhn.be (in Dutch)

Map
- Location in Belgium

Runways
Direction	Length		Surface
Direction	m	ft	Surface
15/33	600	1,969	Grass
- Sources: Belgian AIP

Hoevenen Airfield (Dutch: Vliegveld Hoevenen; ICAO: EBHN) is a small airfield between Antwerp and the Dutch border. It has a grass runway, little hangar space, and a bar/restaurant called Den Buynderdyck. It is home to a flying club Vliegclub Hoevenen and Skydive Antwerp (SDA). Located just outside Antwerp CTR, it is the aerodrome of choice for ULM flyers in this part of the country.

The runway orientation of 15/33 makes it a good place for training cross-wind landings, given the prevailing west winds.

The building of a new clubhouse-cum-hangars had been announced for 2009, this project has been started but made no progress for several years.
