= Saint-Ghislain Airfield =

Saint-Ghislain Airfield Aérodrome de Saint-Ghislain
- IATA: none; ICAO: EBSG

Summary
- Airport type: Private
- Owner: Loc Invest
- Location: Saint-Ghislain, Wallonia, Belgium
- Built: 1974
- Elevation AMSL: 75 ft / 23 m
- Coordinates: 50°27′27″N 003°49′13″E
- Website: https://ebsg.aero

Map
- Location in Belgium

Runways
Direction	Length		Surface
Direction	m	ft	Surface
09/27	640	2,100	Asphalt
- Sources: Belgian AIP

Saint-Ghislain Airfield (French: Aérodrome de Saint-Ghislain) (IATA: N/A, ICAO: EBSG) is a recreational airfield located in the Walloon municipality of Saint-Ghislain, province of Hainaut, Belgium.

Privately managed, the aerodrome is home to two active flight schools, and to other aeronautical oriented leisure activities, such as vintage aircraft restoration, skydiving or amateur aircraft building.

A modernization was completed in 1992, including hard-surfacing of the single runway.
