= Karksi Airfield =

Airfield in Estonia

Coordinates: 58°07′03″N 025°33′09″E

Karksi Airfield (Estonian: Karksi lennuväli; ICAO: EEKI) is an airfield in Karksi-Nuia, Viljandi County, Estonia.

The airfield's owner is the organization Mulgimaa Elu Edendamise Keskus.
