= Koblenz-Winningen Airport =

Koblenz-Winningen Airport Advanced Landing Ground Y-63
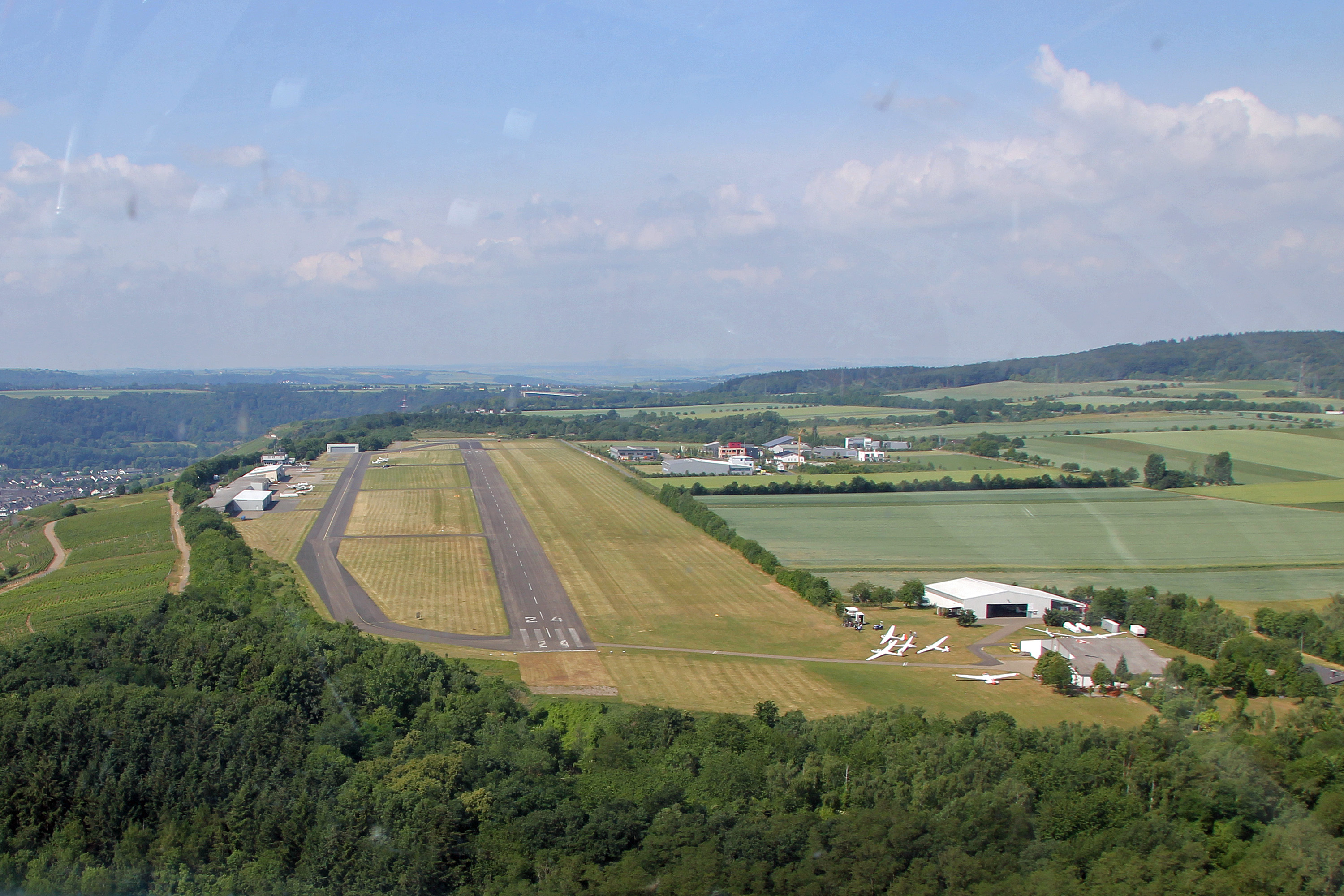
- IATA: ZNV; ICAO: EDRK

Summary
- Airport type: Public
- Location: Koblenz, Germany
- Elevation AMSL: 195 m / 640 ft
- Coordinates: 50°19′30″N 007°31′59″E

Map

Runways
Direction	Length		Surface
Direction	ft	m	Surface
04/22	3,855	1,168	Asphalt

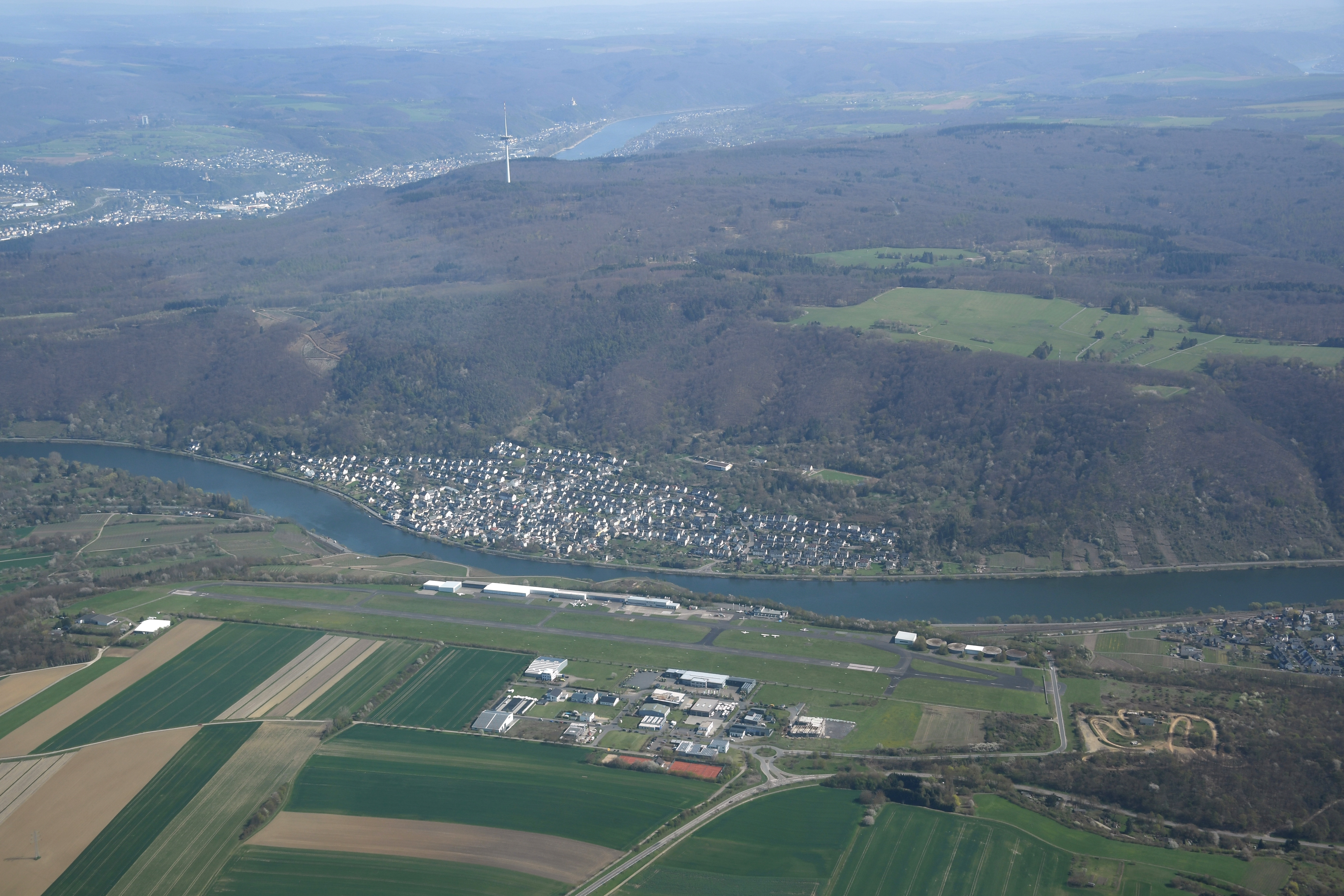
Location of the Koblenz-Winningen Airport on a plateau above the Moselle

Koblenz-Winningen Airport is a regional airport in Germany (ICAO: EDRK). It supports general aviation with no commercial scheduled airline service.

== History ==
The airfield was used by the United States Army Air Forces during World War II by IX Air Support Command, Ninth Air Force as a Supply and Evacuation/ Emergency Landing Airfield during March–May 1945.
