= Spa-La Sauvenière Airfield =

Spa-La Sauvenière Airfield Aérodrome de Spa-La Sauvenière
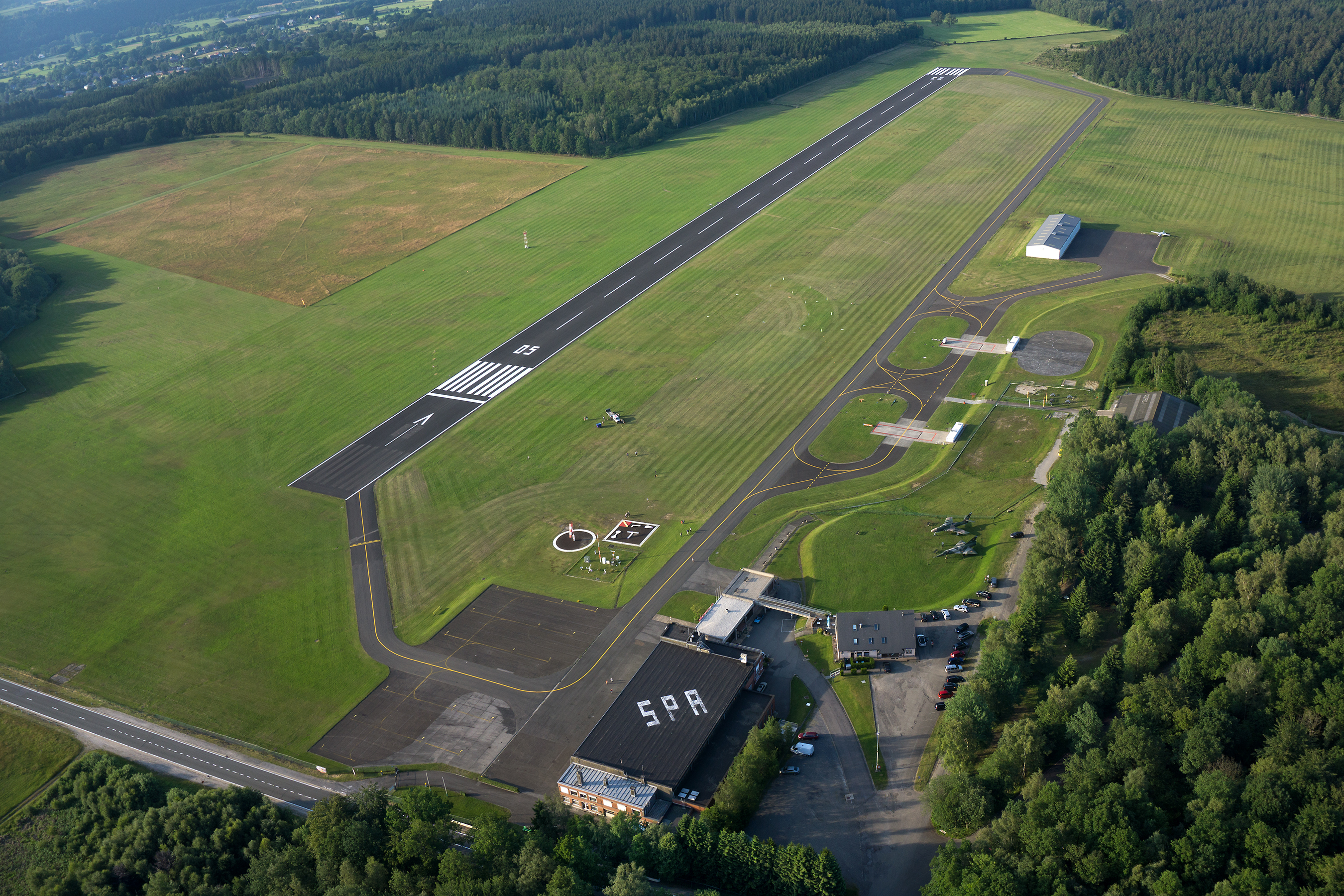
- Aerial view of the airfield
- IATA: none; ICAO: EBSP

Summary
- Airport type: Private
- Operator: Service Public de Wallonie
- Location: Spa, Wallonia, Belgium
- Elevation AMSL: 1,542 ft / 470 m
- Coordinates: 50°28′57″N 005°54′37″E

Map
- Location in Belgium

Runways
Direction	Length		Surface
Direction	m	ft	Surface
05/23	799	2,621	Asphalt
- Sources: Belgian AIP

Spa-La Sauvenière Airfield (ICAO: EBSP) is a general aviation airfield located in Spa, a municipality of Wallonia (southern Belgium).

== Overview ==
The field is managed by the regional (Walloon) authority, and is home to the Royal Aéro Para Club de Spa (RAPCS). Paradropping activities are in progress during all the year by the Skydive Spa Company and there is also a company with 1 or 2 helicopters called Heli&Co. The nearby Francorchamps racetrack attracts a fair amount of air traffic when races are run.

== See also ==
- Transportation in Belgium
