= Viljandi Airfield =

Airfield in Estonia

Coordinates: 58°20′55″N 025°29′40″E

Viljandi Airfield (Estonian: Viljandi lennuväli; ICAO: EEVI) is an airfield in Viljandi, Estonia.

The airfield's owner is NGO Viljandi Lennuklubi.
