= List of airports in Estonia =

Airports with scheduled services

This is a list of airports and airfields in Estonia.

== Airports ==
Airport names shown in bold indicate the facility has scheduled passenger service on a commercial airline.

City served/location	ICAO	IATA	Airport name	Rwy (m)	Rwy (ft)	Runway	Notes & references	Coordinates
Alliku (Saue Parish)			Alliku Airfield	700 × 17	2,297 × 56	14/32, grass	private	59°22′11″N 024°33′06″E
Antsla	EEAA		Antsla Airfield	630 × 20	2,067 × 66	06/24, grass	private	57°49′34″N 026°29′33″E
Humala (Harku Parish)	EEHA		Humala Airfield	420 × 20	1,378 × 66	05/23, grass	private	59°21′21″N 024°22′35″E
Jõhvi / Puru	EEJI		Jõhvi Airfield (Jhvi Airfield)	600 × 30	1,969 × 98	05/23, grass	private	59°19′34″N 027°23′35″E
Karksi-Nuia / Polli	EEKI		Karksi Airfield	675 × 49	2,215 × 161	16/34, grass	uncertified	58°06′56″N 025°33′10″E
Kuressaare	EEKE	URE	**Kuressaare Airport**	2,000 × 30	6,562 × 98	17/35 & 05/23, asphalt	civil, international	58°13′48″N 022°30′34″E
Kärdla / Hiiessaare	EEKA	KDL	**Kärdla Airport**	1,520 × 30	4,987 × 98	14/32, asphalt	civil, international	58°59′27″N 022°49′51″E
Kihnu	EEKU		Kihnu Airfield	600 × 20	1,969 × 66	04/22 & 15/33, grass	civil	58°08′54″N 024°00′09″E
Lange (Kastre Parish)	EELM		Lange Airfield (Lennundusmuuseum)					58°17′25″N 026°46′00″E
Saare (Lääne-Nigula Parish)	EELU		Lyckholm Airfield (Saare Airfield)	600 × 60	1,969 × 197	11/29, grass	private	59°01′23″N 023°34′42″E
Nässuma (Saaremaa Parish)			Nässuma Airfield			grass	private	58°17′01″N 022°49′04″E
Pärnu / Eametsa	EEPU	EPU	**Pärnu Airport**	799 × 23	2,621 × 75	03/21, concrete	civil, international	58°25′08″N 024°28′22″E
Rakvere	EERE		Rakvere Airfield	750 × 25	2,461 × 82	09/27, grass; 15/33, closed	private	59°22′06″N 026°21′29″E
Rapla / Iira	EERA		Rapla Airfield (Kuusiku Airfield)	1,500 × 60	4,920 × 200	33L/15R, grass; 33R/15L, grass	private	58°59′11″N 024°43′28″E
Suurküla (Põlva Parish)	EERI		Ridali Airfield	1,100 × 300	3,610 × 980	18/36, grass	gliding club	57°56′34″N 026°58′40″E
Riidaja (Tõrva Parish)	EERD		Riidaja Airfield	600 × 20	1,969 × 66	09/27, grass	hang gliding	58°05′07″N 025°53′56″E
Ruhnu	EERU		**Ruhnu Airfield**	600 × 20	1,969 × 66	13/31, grass	civil	57°47′02″N 023°15′58″E
Tallinn / Linnahall	EECL		Tallinn/City Hall Heliport	8	26	concrete	heliport, civil, international	59°26′53″N 024°45′12″E
Tallinn / Ülemiste	EETN	TLL	**Tallinn Airport** (Lennart Meri Tallinn Airport)	3,480 × 45	11,417 × 148	08/26, asphalt/concrete	civil, international	59°24′48″N 024°49′57″E
Tapa	EETA		Tapa Airfield	2,500	8,200	05/23, concrete	military; not used	59°14′06″N 025°57′06″E
Tartu / Reola	EETU	TAY	**Tartu Ülenurme Airport**	1,799 × 31	5,902 × 102	08/26, asphalt/concrete	civil, international	58°18′27″N 026°41′13″E
Tõutsi (Otepää Parish)	EETI		Tõutsi Airfield					
Viljandi / Päri	EEVI		Viljandi Airfield	800 × 30	2,625 × 98	05/23, grass	flight club	58°21′00″N 025°29′35″E
Vormsi	EEVO		Vormsi Airfield	700 × 30	2,297 × 98	17/35, grass	opened 2012	58°59′07″N 023°15′06″E
Ämari	EEEI		Ämari Air Base	2,750 × 45	9,022 × 148	06/24, asphalt/concrete	military	59°15′37″N 024°12′30″E

== Abandoned aerodromes ==
City served/location	ICAO	IATA	Airport name	Rwy (m)	Rwy (ft)	Runway	Notes & references	Coordinates
Avaste (Märjamaa Parish)			Avaste Airfield	400 × 20	1,312 × 66	03/21, asphalt	Soviet chemistry airfield	58°42′27″N 024°13′19″E
Haapsalu / Kiltsi	EEHU		Haapsalu Airfield (Kiltsi Airfield)	2,500 × 40	8,200 × 130	09/27, concrete	military; abandoned	58°54′42″N 023°29′18″E
Jägala (Jõelähtme Parish)			Jägala Airfield (Jägala highway strip)	2,400	7,900	12/30, concrete	road extension	59°23′52″N 025°17′26″E
Türisalu (Harku Parish)			Keila-Joa Airfield	1,000 × 50	3,280 × 160	10/28, grass/metal, 15/33, grass	soviet military; perished	59°24′22″N 024°20′19″E
Kureküla (Elva Parish)			Kureküla Airfield	425	1,394	17/35, asphalt	not used	58°15′52″N 026°12′03″E
Tallinn / Lasnamäe			Tallinn-Lasnamäe Airfield	2,500	8,200	concrete	demolished	59°27′00″N 024°51′48″E
Mõnnuste (Saaremaa Parish)			Kogula Airfield			15/33	abandoned	58°18′25″N 022°16′06″E
Narva / Soldina	EENA		Narva Airfield	600 × 50	1,970 × 160	grass	abandoned	59°23′26″N 028°06′15″E
Rutja (Haljala Parish)			Rutja Airfield (Kunda Airfield)	2,500	8,200	05/23, concrete	abandoned	59°32′12″N 026°18′42″E
Sargvere (Paide)	EENI		Nurmsi Airfield (Koigi Airfield)	2,500	8,200	14/32, grass	private	58°51′41″N 025°44′06″E
Sätsuvere (Jõgeva Parish)			Rääbise Airfield	400 × 20	1,312 × 66	06/24, asphalt	soviet chemistry airfield, abandoned	58°47′48″N 026°38′38″E
Suislepa (Viljandi Parish)			Suislepa Airfield (Obriku, Mustla, Tõrva, Torva and Torva North)	3,000	9,800	18/36, grass	abandoned	58°11′24″N 025°56′54″E
Tartu / Raadi	EETR		Tartu-Raadi Airfield (Tartu Air Base)	3,000 × 75	9,843 × 246	09/27, concrete	military, abandoned	58°24′17″N 026°46′25″E
Piirissaar	EEPR		Piirissaare Airfield			grass	abandoned	58°22′54″N 027°31′21″E
Valga / Jaanikese			Valga Airfield	2,000	6,600	grass	military, demolished	57°48′48″N 026°04′36″E
Vantri (Saaremaa Parish)			Aste Airfield	2,500 × 40	8,200 × 130	17/35, grass	abandoned	58°21′38″N 022°26′49″E
Varstu (Rõuge Parish)			Varstu Airfield	400 × 20	1,312 × 66	03/21, asphalt	abandoned	57°38′00″N 026°40′12″E
Vatla (Lääneranna Parish)			Vatla Airfield (Vatla Highway Strip)	2,500	8,200	10/28, grass	road extension; not used	58°33′58″N 23°48′11″E
Võhma			Võhma Airfield	2,000	6,600	grass	demolished	58°39′52″N 025°34′37″E

== See also ==
- Transport in Estonia
- List of airports by ICAO code: EB-EG#EE – Estonia
- Wikipedia: Airline destination lists: Europe#Estonia
- List of the busiest airports in the Baltic states
