= Kuusiku =

Borough in Estonia

- Small borough
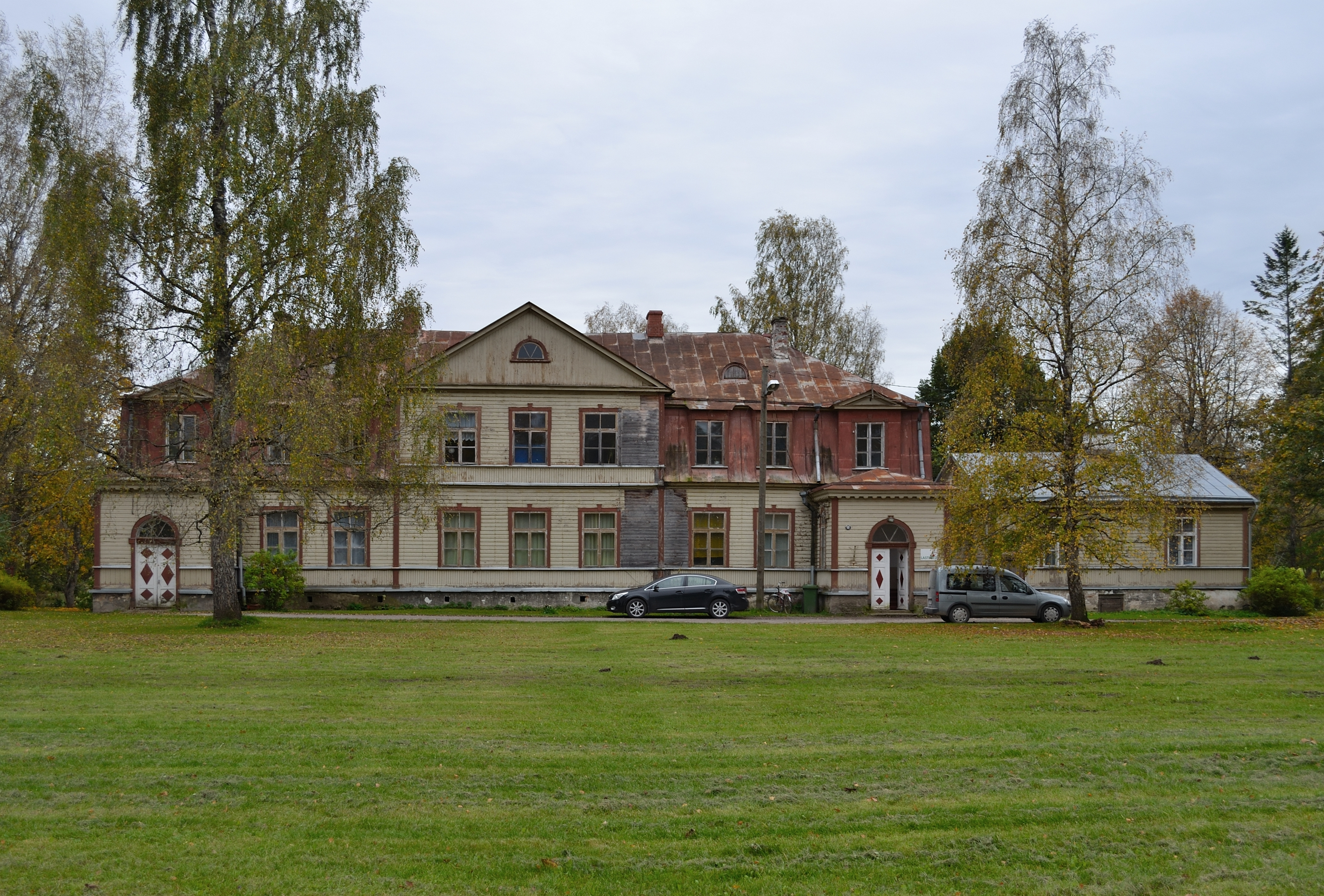
- Main building of Kuusiku Manor

- Location in Estonia
- Coordinates: 58°58′20″N 24°43′44″E
- Country: Estonia
- County: Rapla County
- Municipality: Rapla Parish

Population
  - Total: 250

Kuusiku (German: Saage) is a small borough (Estonian: alevik) in Rapla Parish, Rapla County, Estonia. It has a population of 250. Buildings of Kuusiku Manor are located in Kuusiku in part. Rapla Airfield (Kuusiku Airfield) is located north, in the neighbouring Iira village.

== Climate ==
Climate data for Kuusiku (normals 1991–2020, extremes 1920–present)
Month	Jan	Feb	Mar	Apr	May	Jun	Jul	Aug	Sep	Oct	Nov	Dec	Year
Record high °C (°F)	8.8 (47.8)	11.1 (52.0)	18.1 (64.6)	26.5 (79.7)	30.5 (86.9)	32.2 (90.0)	33.6 (92.5)	33.4 (92.1)	28.4 (83.1)	20.9 (69.6)	13.5 (56.3)	10.8 (51.4)	33.6 (92.5)
Mean daily maximum °C (°F)	−1.3 (29.7)	−1.2 (29.8)	3.0 (37.4)	10.5 (50.9)	16.9 (62.4)	20.3 (68.5)	23.1 (73.6)	21.8 (71.2)	16.4 (61.5)	9.4 (48.9)	3.6 (38.5)	0.4 (32.7)	10.2 (50.4)
Daily mean °C (°F)	−3.8 (25.2)	−4.4 (24.1)	−1.1 (30.0)	4.9 (40.8)	10.6 (51.1)	14.7 (58.5)	17.4 (63.3)	16.0 (60.8)	11.3 (52.3)	5.7 (42.3)	1.4 (34.5)	−1.8 (28.8)	5.9 (42.6)
Mean daily minimum °C (°F)	−6.8 (19.8)	−7.9 (17.8)	−5.2 (22.6)	−0.2 (31.6)	3.9 (39.0)	8.4 (47.1)	11.4 (52.5)	10.4 (50.7)	6.6 (43.9)	2.3 (36.1)	−1.2 (29.8)	−4.1 (24.6)	1.4 (34.5)
Record low °C (°F)	−39 (−38)	−37.6 (−35.7)	−35.1 (−31.2)	−24.4 (−11.9)	−6.7 (19.9)	−2.7 (27.1)	0.5 (32.9)	−2.5 (27.5)	−7 (19)	−17 (1)	−24.3 (−11.7)	−40.6 (−41.1)	−40.6 (−41.1)
Average precipitation mm (inches)	58 (2.3)	43 (1.7)	40 (1.6)	38 (1.5)	43 (1.7)	77 (3.0)	73 (2.9)	90 (3.5)	62 (2.4)	80 (3.1)	66 (2.6)	63 (2.5)	730 (28.7)
Average precipitation days (≥ 1.0 mm)	12.3	10.0	8.9	7.8	7.4	9.8	9.7	10.4	10.1	12.8	12.1	13.2	124.5
Average relative humidity (%)	91	88	81	73	69	74	77	81	85	89	92	92	83
Mean monthly sunshine hours	30.3	57.0	130.1	189.1	263.1	253.4	263.6	218.9	136.6	78.4	28.2	15.3	1,659.2
Source 1: Estonian Weather Service
Source 2: NOAA/NCEI (precipitation day, 1991-2020)

== Gallery ==
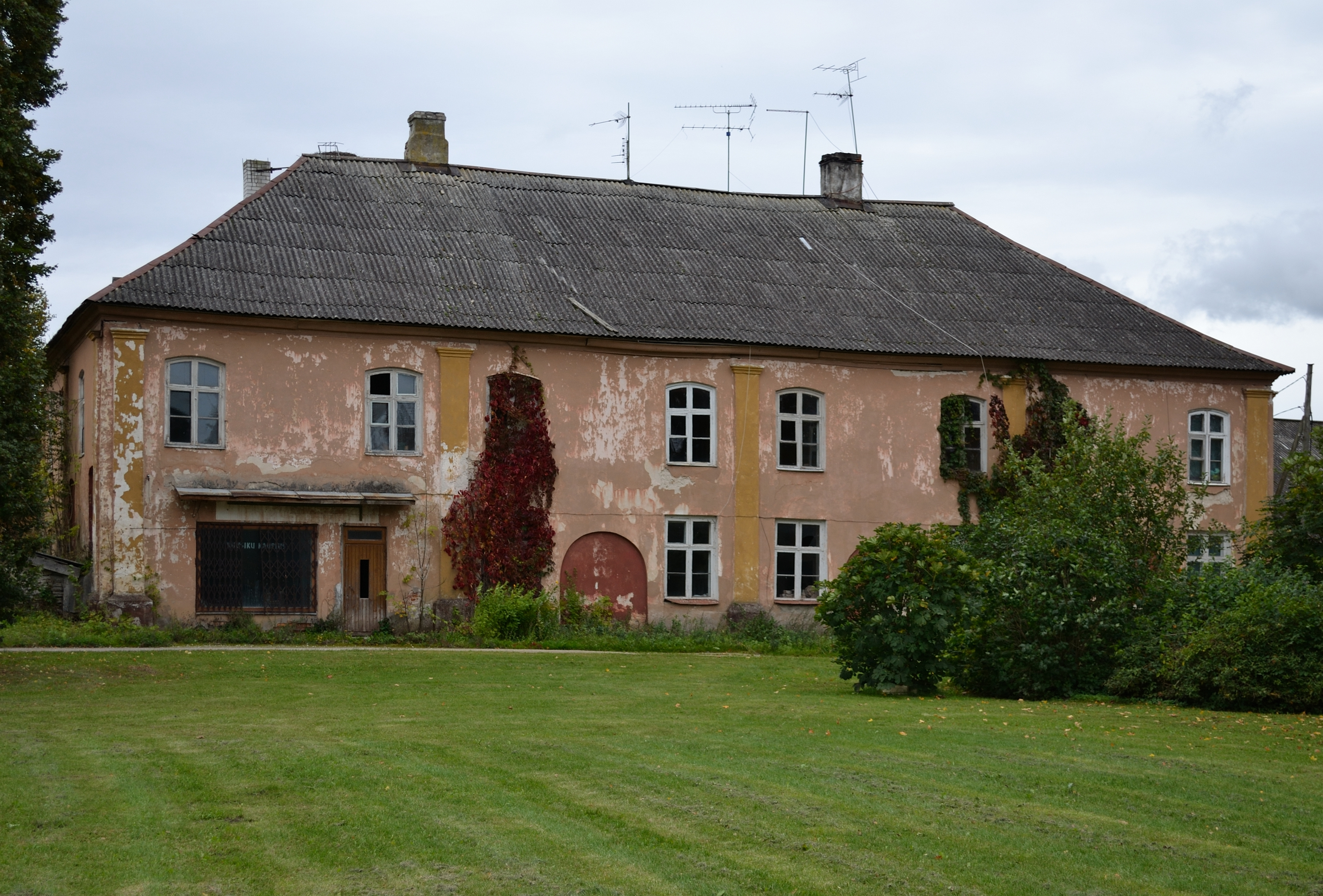
Kuusiku manor potato flour factory

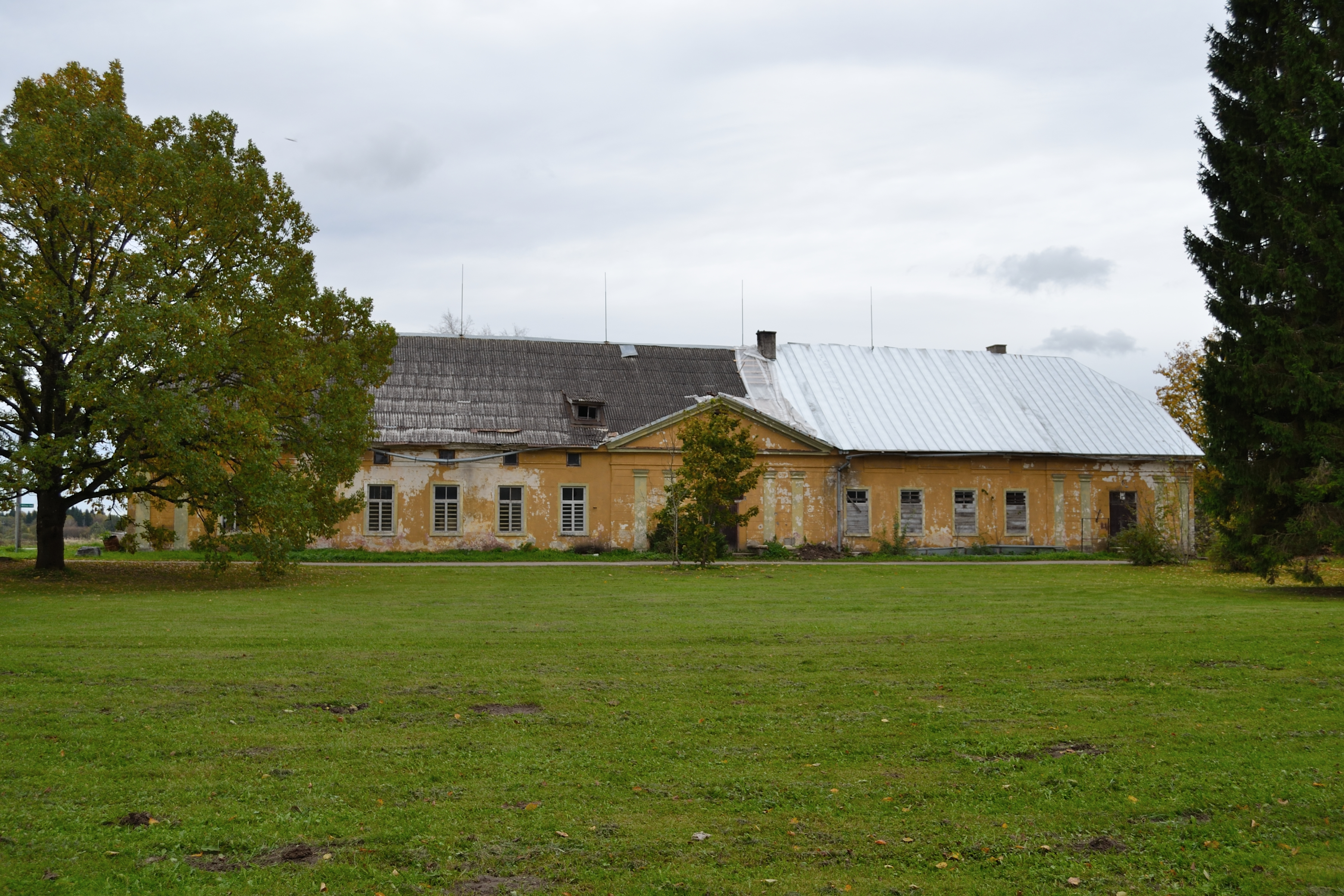
Kuusiku manor stable-coach house
