= List of suicide locations =

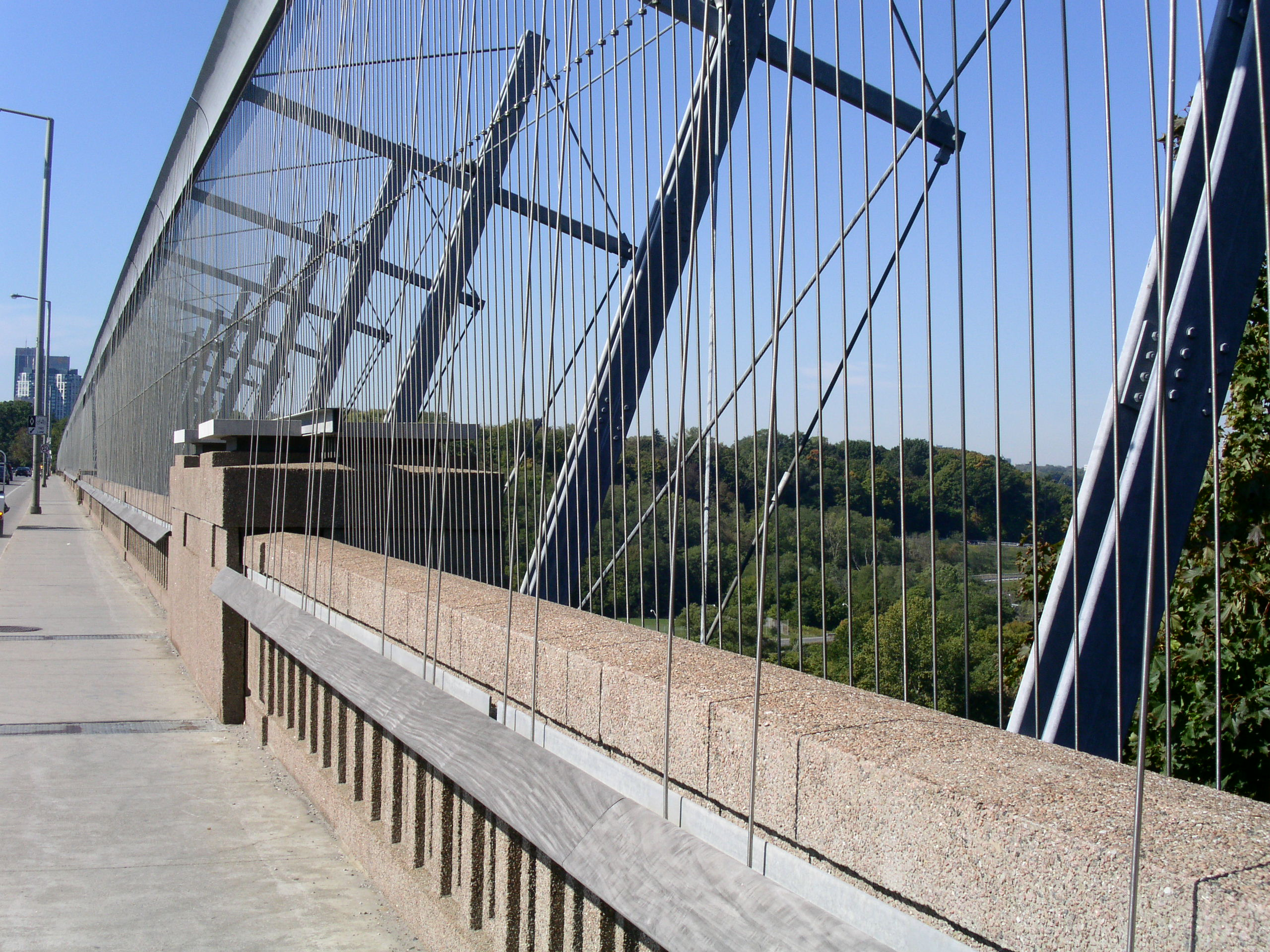
The Luminous Veil on Toronto's Prince Edward Viaduct to prevent people from jumping.

The following is a list of current and historic sites frequently chosen to attempt suicide, usually by jumping. Some of the sites listed have installed suicide barriers, signs advising potential suicides to take other actions, and other precautions, such as crisis hotline phones.

Exact numbers of victims are sometimes difficult to determine, as many jurisdictions and media agencies have ceased collecting statistics and reporting suicides at common sites, in the belief that the reporting may encourage others.

== Locations with highest suicide rate ==
- Nanjing Yangtze River Bridge, Nanjing, Jiangsu
- Golden Gate Bridge, San Francisco, California, United States – more than 1,600 known suicides; the number is believed to be higher because of people whose bodies were never found.
- Prince Edward Viaduct, Toronto, Ontario, Canada – 492 suicides before the Luminous Veil, a barrier of 9,000 steel rods, was constructed in 2003.
- Aokigahara forest, Mount Fuji, Japan – as many as 105 suicides a year, though the number may be higher.
- The Gap, Sydney, New South Wales, Australia – A large sea cliff. Roughly 50 suicides a year.

== Locations by continent ==
=== Africa ===
Site	City	Region	Country	Notes and references
Ponte Apartment Building	Johannesburg	Gauteng	South Africa	^{[dead link]}
Van Stadens Bridge	–	Eastern Cape	South Africa	88 suicides since construction in 1971.
Cairo Tower	Cairo	Cairo Governorate	Egypt	

=== Asia ===
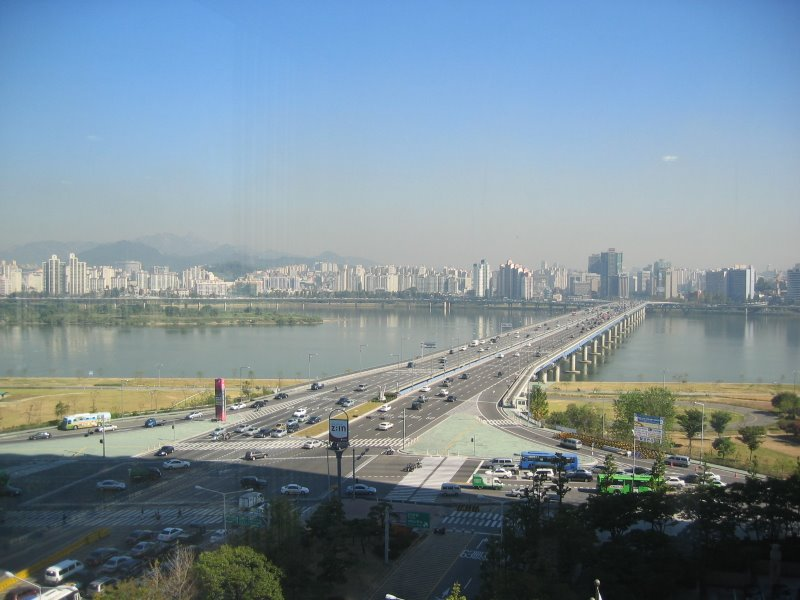
The Mapo Bridge in Seoul, South Korea has been nicknamed "Suicide Bridge" and "The Bridge of Death" due to its frequent usage as a suicide hotspot, part of South Korea's ongoing suicide epidemic.

Site	City	Region	Country	Notes and references
Nanjing Yangtze River Bridge	Nanjing	Jiangsu	China	Over 2,000 suicides by 2006
Wuhan Yangtze River Bridge	Wuhan	Hubei	China	24.7 suicides per year
Hussain Sagar	Hyderabad	Telangana	India	
Delhi Metro	Delhi	Delhi	India	At least 83 suicides
Rabindra Sarobar metro station	Kolkata	West Bengal	India	
Kolkata Metro	Kolkata	West Bengal	India	
Milad Tower	Tehran	Tehran	Iran	Until 2012, three suicides occurred by persons jumping from Milad Tower.
Tehran Metro	Tehran	Tehran	Iran	
Aokigahara forest	–	Yamanashi	Japan	Up to 105 suicides a year
Kegon Falls	–	Tochigi	Japan	The suicide of the student and poet Misao Fujimura in 1903, who wrote a farewell poem on the trunk of a tree before jumping to his death from the Kegon Falls, was reported widely and sensationalized in the newspapers, and led to many copycat suicides from the falls.
Mount Mihara	Ōshima	Tokyo	Japan	An active volcano on the island of Izu Ōshima. After a suicide in 1933, media reports led to hundreds of copycat suicides until 1936, when access was restricted.
Shin-Koiwa Station	Tokyo	Tokyo	Japan	
Tojinbo, Japan	Sakai	Fukui	Japan	
Mapo Bridge	Seoul	Gyeonggi Province	South Korea	
Han River	–	–	South Korea	
Abdoun Bridge	Amman	Amman	Jordan	
Penang Bridge	Penang	Penang	Malaysia	
Suramadu Bridge	Surabaya	East Java	Indonesia	

=== Europe ===
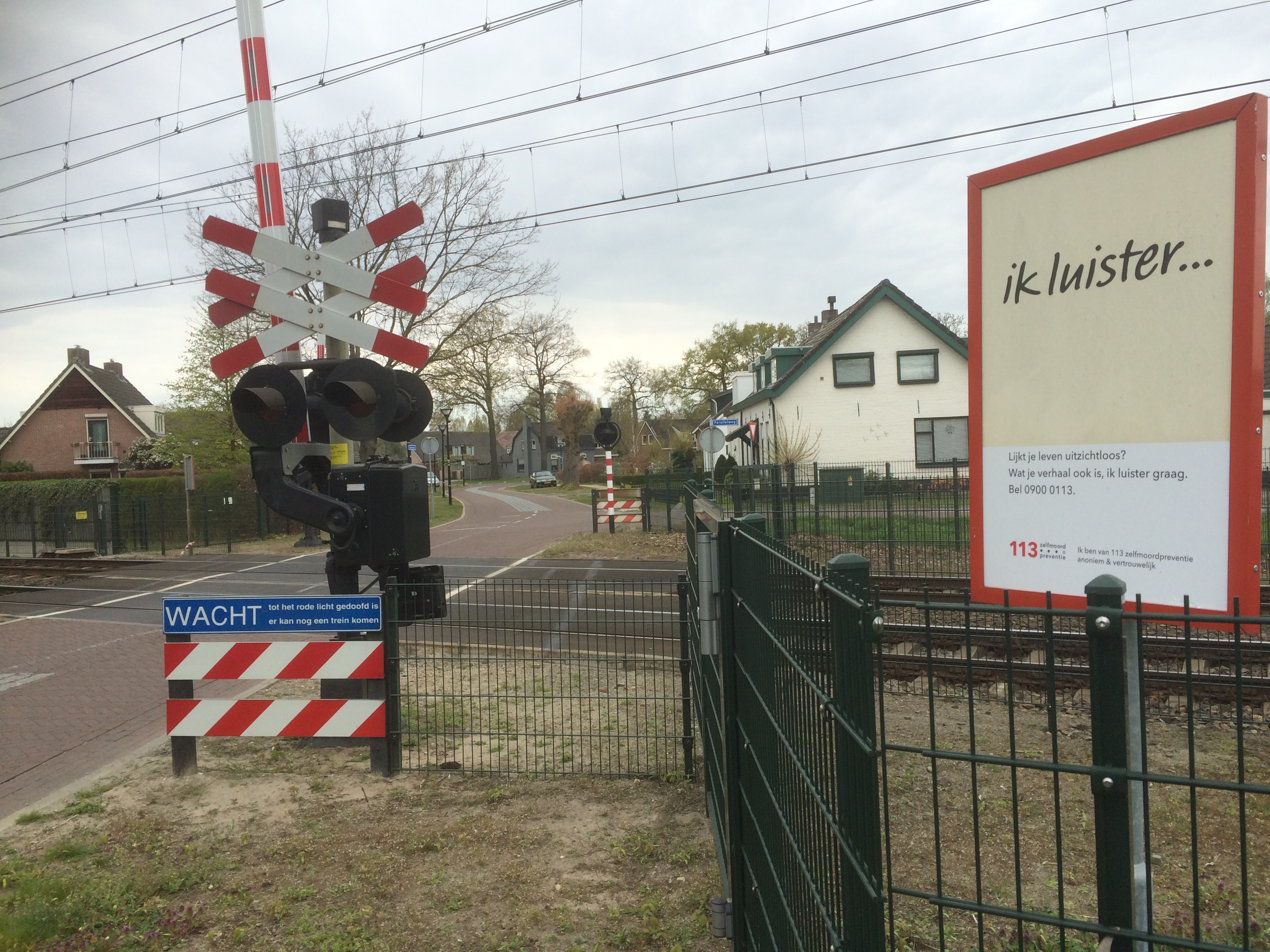
A sign at a railroad crossing in the Netherlands promoting a suicide crisis line (113)

Site	City	Region	Country	Notes and references
Résidence Pacific	Saint-Josse-ten-Noode	Brussels	Belgium	Earned the local moniker "Suicide Tower" (Tour des Suicidés). In 2007, 6 suicides over the course of 18 months were reported. A 2019 documentary titled Pacific deals with the tower and its recurrent suicides.
Nusle Bridge	Prague	Czech Republic	Czechia	At least 365 deaths.
Archway Bridge	London	London	England	
Beachy Head	–	East Sussex	England	20 suicides a year
Clifton Suspension Bridge	Bristol	South West England	England	More than 500 suicides since opening in 1864. Suicide barriers were installed in 1998, which halved the suicide rate over the years following.
Humber Bridge	Kingston-upon-Hull	East Riding of Yorkshire	England	More than 200 incidents of people jumping or falling from the bridge took place in the first 26 years after it opened in 1981.
London Underground	London	London	England	~50 attempts annually
The Monument	London	London	England	Was the site of six suicides between 1788 and 1842, when the gallery was enclosed by an iron cage to prevent such misfortunes occurring again.
Türisalu cliff	Türisalu	Harju County	Estonia	
Paris Métro	Paris		France	20 to 40 deaths per year.
Göltzsch Viaduct	Reichenbach im Vogtland	Saxony	Germany	Exemplary attraction for attempting suicide in Germany, under continued supervision by the Federal Police, scene of a 2001 suicide pact that led to the 2002 documentary Teuflische Spiele (Diabolical Games).
Kocher Viaduct	Schwäbisch Hall	Baden-Württemberg	Germany	Highest bridge in the country. A suicide barrier was installed on the bridge after an unusually high 48 suicides between 1979 and 1990.
Cliffs of Moher	–	County Clare	Ireland	Four prevented suicides in 2008
Grand Duchess Charlotte Bridge	Luxembourg City	–	Luxembourg	More than 100 suicides since opening in 1966. Since 1993, a Plexiglas barrier has prevented people from jumping off the bridge and falling on top of the houses below.
Foyle Bridge	Derry	County Londonderry	Northern Ireland	More than 90 suicides since 1984
Karmsund Bridge		Rogaland	Norway	Estimated 25 suicides.
25 de Abril Bridge	Lisbon	Lisbon	Portugal	
Erskine Bridge	Erskine	East Renfrewshire	Scotland	
Forth Road Bridge	–	Edinburgh	Scotland	Estimated over 20 suicides a year – more than 800 since the bridge opened in 1964*
Segovia Viaduct	Madrid	Madrid	Spain	Colloquially called the suicide bridge, starting from the 17th century until the 1990s, when it saw fatal falls at an average of one a week. A barrier was erected in 1998.
Älvsborg Bridge	Gothenburg	Västra Götaland	Sweden	
Västerbron	Stockholm	Stockholm	Sweden	
Bosphorus Bridge	Istanbul	Marmara	Turkey	
Southerndown	-	Vale of Glamorgan	Wales	Well known in the local area for suicides; at least 9 between 2000 and 2003.
Severn Bridge	–	–	Wales	

=== North America ===
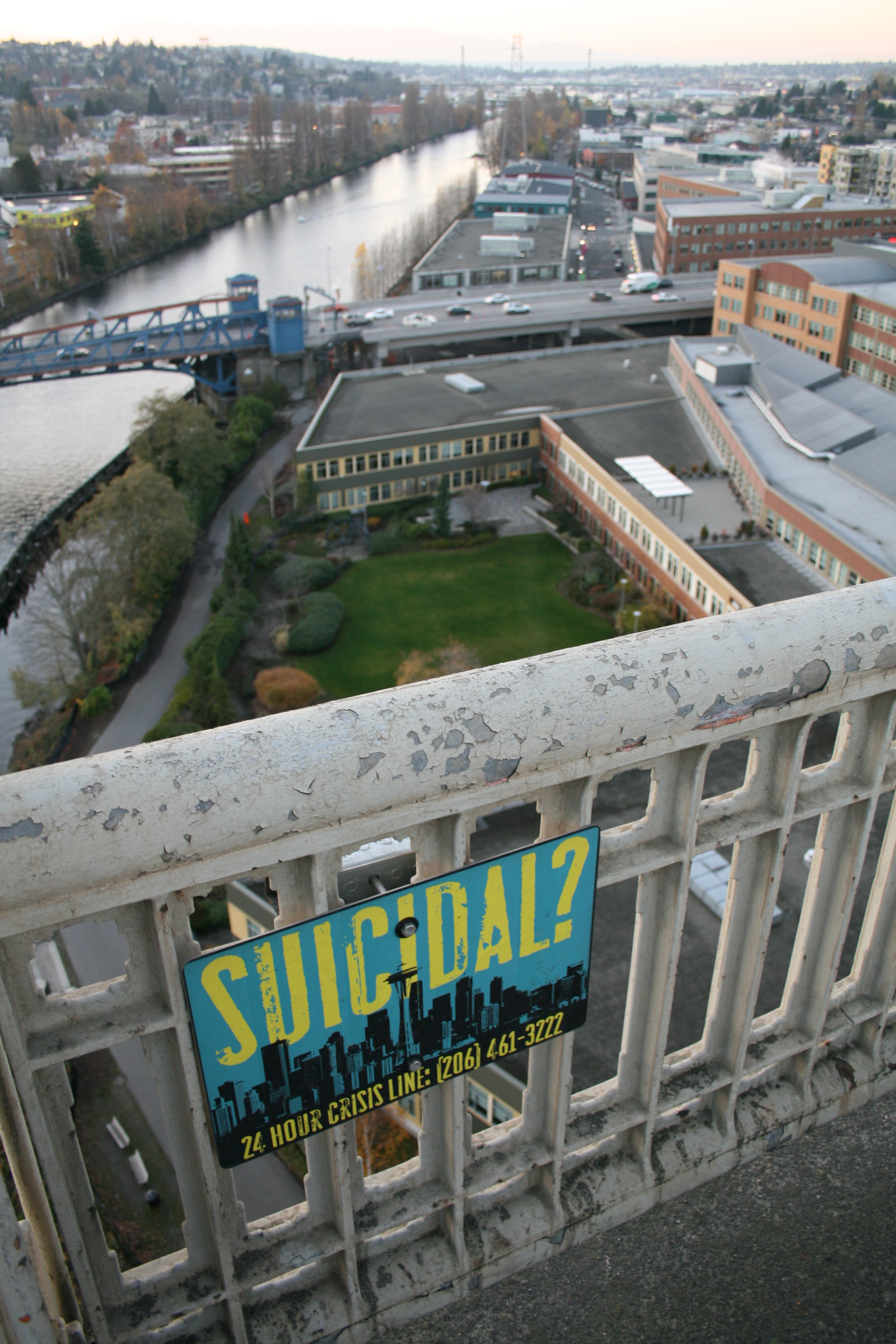
Suicide hotline on the George Washington Memorial Bridge, Seattle, Washington

Site	City	Region	Country	Notes and references
Jacques Cartier Bridge	Montreal	Quebec	Canada	More than 143 suicides. Suicide barriers were erected in 2004.
Prince Edward Viaduct	Toronto	Ontario	Canada	The Luminous Veil suicide barrier was installed in 2003, after 492 suicides were recorded. Post barrier installation, there has only been one recorded suicide as of 2017.
Leaside Bridge	Toronto	Ontario	Canada	Following the installation of the Luminous Veil suicide barrier on the Prince Edward Viaduct in 2003, the number of suicides at the nearby Leaside Bridge has gradually increased over the years. Following a 2024 incident where a car passenger was killed by a jumper from the bridge, construction of suicide barriers have finally been approved.
Toronto subway	Toronto	Ontario	Canada	150 people have killed themselves, and there have been an additional 100 attempts between 1998 and 2007.
Niagara Falls	–	Ontario/ New York	Canada/ United States	Between 1856 and 1995 there were 2,780 known suicides; and there are 20 to 25 per year.
Arrigoni Bridge	Middletown	Connecticut	United States	
Colorado Street Bridge	Pasadena	California	United States	Has been the host of numerous falls/jumps starting as early as its construction, when a worker who had been drinking fell off the bridge into wet cement. It has hosted many suicides since, and a large barrier/fence has been installed to keep people from jumping.
Coronado Bridge (also known as San Diego–Coronado Bridge)	San Diego	California	United States	More than 200 suicides (1972–2000)
Foresthill Bridge	Auburn	California	United States	Estimated 65 suicides since construction in 1973, actual number likely higher
Golden Gate Bridge	San Francisco	California	United States	Official count halted at 997 to prevent "record breakers"
Sunshine Skyway Bridge	Tampa Bay	Florida	United States	At least 264 suicides by jumping from the center span into the waters of Tampa Bay since the opening of the new bridge in 1987. In response, the State of Florida installed crisis hotline phones and began 24-hour patrols. The song "Skyway Avenue" by We The Kings is about two lovers who decide to jump to their deaths together from this bridge.
Penobscot Narrows Bridge and Observatory	Verona Island	Maine	United States	12 confirmed suicides since opening in 2006; more are suspected by authorities. The state declined to install fencing around the bridge due to cost, and instead installed telephones connected to the suicide prevention hotline.
Governor Thomas Johnson Bridge	Southern Maryland	Maryland	United States	
George Washington Bridge	New York City	New York/New Jersey	United States	It has been averaging around 10 suicides per year and a record 18 in 2012. 18-year-old Tyler Clementi jumped from the bridge in 2010 after being cyberbullied.
Tappan Zee Bridge	Tarrytown	New York	United States	More than 30 suicides between 2002 and 2012; sometimes referred to as "the Golden Gate Bridge of the East" This bridge was replaced in 2017 by a new twin span with fencing on its pedestrian/bicycle path to deter jumpers.
Vessel	New York City	New York	United States	In the less than two years that the Vessel was open to the public, four people jumped to their deaths. After the first three deaths, some limited changes were made to prevent suicide. The Vessel was closed following the fourth death, but reopened in October 2024 with mesh barriers installed as a safety feature.
Vista Bridge	Portland	Oregon	United States	
George Washington Memorial Bridge ("Aurora Bridge")	Seattle	Washington	United States	More than 230 suicides since 1932, with more than 50 from 1997 to 2007
New River Gorge Bridge	Fayetteville	West Virginia	United States	
Mexico City Metro	Mexico City	Mexico City	Mexico	More than 178 from 2020 to 2025

=== Oceania ===
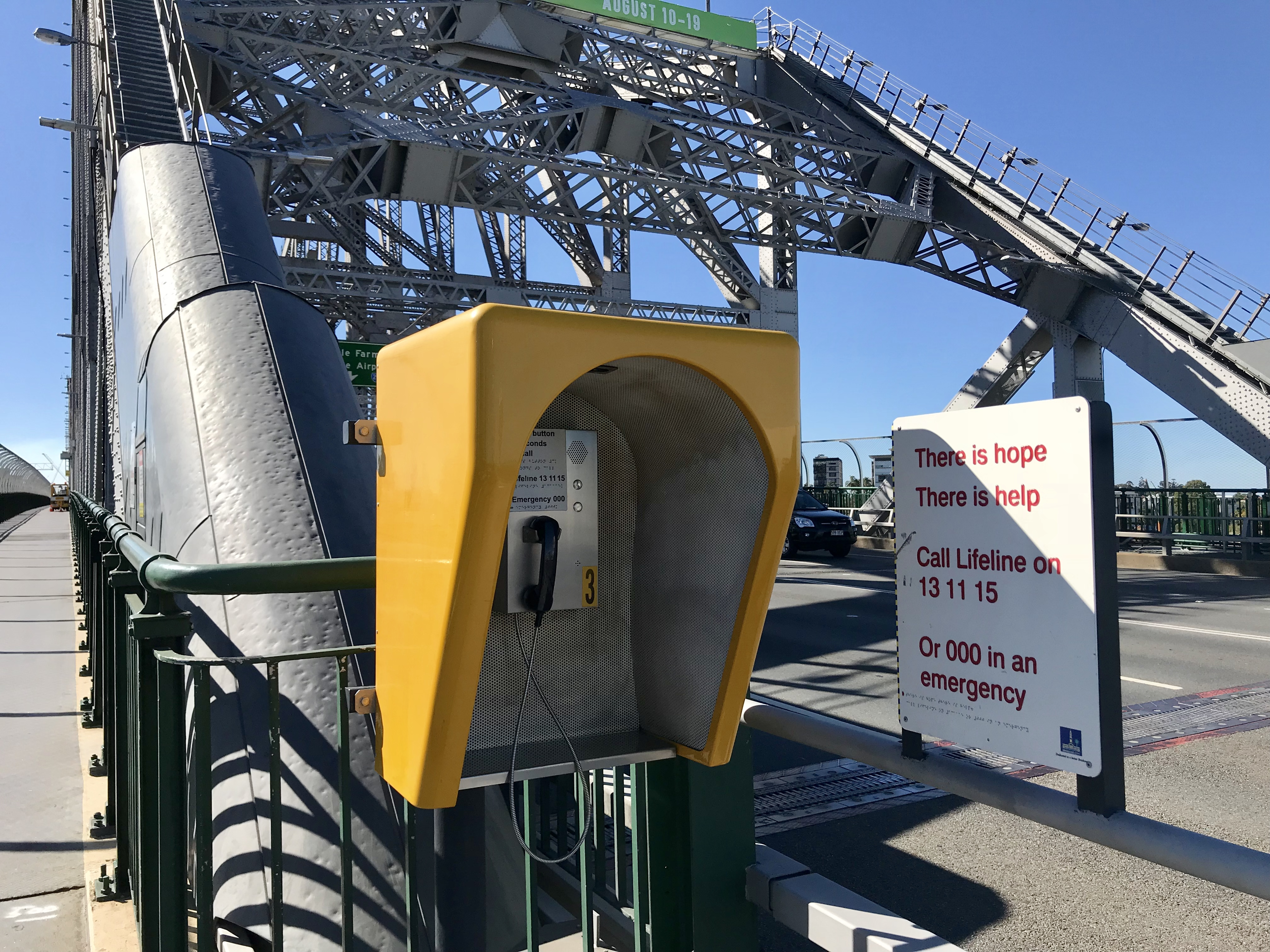
Free telephones linked to suicide prevention hotline installed at the Story Bridge footpath in Brisbane

Site	City	Region	Country	Notes and references
Echo Point	Blue Mountains	New South Wales	Australia	
Grafton Bridge	Auckland	Auckland	New Zealand	Suicide barriers were removed in 1996 after being in place for 60 years but replaced in 2003.
Kelburn Viaduct	Wellington	Wellington	New Zealand	
Lawyer's Head	Dunedin	Otago	New Zealand	
Mooney Mooney Bridge	Central Coast	New South Wales	Australia	Because of its height (making it a known suicide bridge), a fence was erected in 2003 to deter people from jumping off. The fence cost around $1,000,000.
Story Bridge	Brisbane	Queensland	Australia	Brisbane's Story Bridge is notorious for its suicides, having been compared to the Golden Gate Bridge in San Francisco. Free telephones have been installed on the bridge, and the bridge also has a three-metre-high safety barrier.
Sydney Harbour Bridge	Sydney	New South Wales	Australia	Although the bridge is not as well known for suicides as many others in Australia, the bridge has had numerous suicides and incidents (intentional or not) that occur on the bridge usually lead in death.
The Gap	Sydney	New South Wales	Australia	A large sea cliff. Roughly 50 suicides a year
West Gate Bridge	Melbourne	Victoria	Australia	Had "up to one" suicide every three weeks. Suicide rates on the bridge have dropped by 85% since prevention barriers were installed by the state government in 2009.

=== South America ===
Site	City	Region	Country	Notes and references
São Paulo Metro	São Paulo	São Paulo	Brazil	The Metro, as other subway networks in Brazil, have a policy not to publicly disclose the number of suicides taking place in any given period to prevent further attempts.
Third Bridge	Vitória	Espírito Santo	Brazil	The construction of a suicide prevention net is currently being discussed by public authorities and the concessionary of the bridge.
Costanera Center	Santiago	Santiago	Chile	Dubbed as the "suicide mall", the fifth floor and the surrounding stairs had to be covered with large fences due to suicide rates.
Puente de la Virgen (Virgin's Bridge)	Bogotá	Bogotá	Colombia	
Viaducto García Cadena	Bucaramanga	Santander	Colombia	
Eduardo Villena Rey Bridge	Lima	Lima	Peru	The bridge had to be covered with large windows due to suicide rates. The street under the bridge is believed to be haunted.

== See also ==
- Lover's Leap
- Suicide bridge
- Suicide tourism
