= Lange Airfield =

Airfield in Estonia

Lange Airfield Lange lennuväli
- IATA: none; ICAO: EELM

Summary
- Owner: Estonian Aviation Museum
- Coordinates: 58°17′25″N 26°46′00″E

Maps
- Location in Estonia
- Location in Lange, Estonia

Runways
Direction	Length		Surface
Direction	ft	m	Surface
			Asphalt/concrete

Lange Airfield (Estonian: Lange lennuväli; ICAO: EELM) is an airfield in Lange (location of Estonian Aviation Museum), Tartu County, Estonia.

The airfield's owner is Estonian Aviation Museum.
