= Graptolitic argillite =

Sedimentary rock found in Estonia

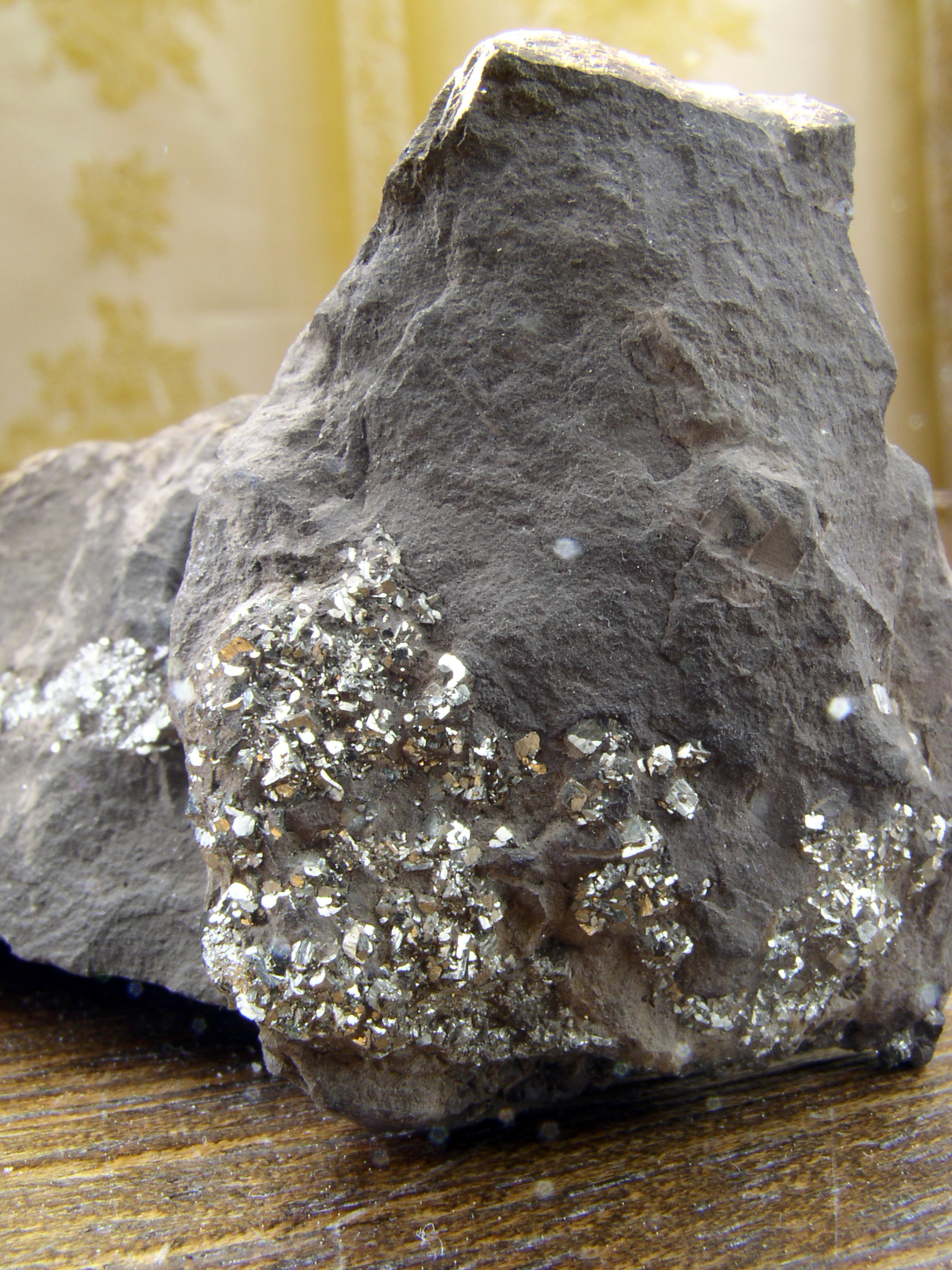
- A specimen of graptolite argillite containing pyrite (FeS_{2}) from the Türisalu cliff, a part of the Türisalu Formation
- Type: Sedimentary

Lithology
- Primary: Black shale
- Other: Slate, oil shale

Location
- Region: Baltoscandian platform
- Country: Estonia

Graptolitic argillite (also known as dictyonema argillite, dictyonema oil shale, dictyonema shale, or Tremadocian black shale) is a marinite-type black shale of sapropelic origin. It is a blackish to greyish lithified claystone. The known occurrence of this rock is a graptolitic argillite of the Türisalu Formation in northern Estonia and northwest Russia. It is correlated with Swedish alum shale being its younger facial eastward continuation, and both being a part of the Baltoscandic Cambrian-Ordovician black shale, together with black shales in the Oslo region in Norway, Bornholm, Denmark, and Poland. Other known occurrences are in North America, the Malay Peninsula, and New Zealand.

Although the name dictyonema argillite is widely used instead of graptolitic argillite, this name is now considered a misnomer as the graptolite fossils in the rock, earlier considered dictyonemids, were reclassified during the 1980s as members of the genus Rhabdinopora.

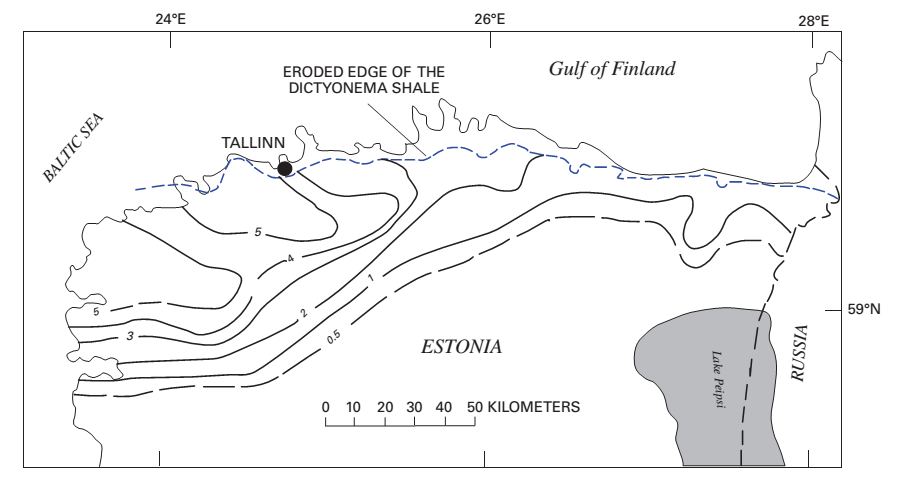
An isopach map of the Ordovician graptolitic argillite deposits in northern Estonia, indicating thickness in meters

In mainland Estonia, it occurs at the foot of the North-Estonia Klint, ranging from the Pakri Peninsula to Narva in an area covering about 11,000 square kilometres (4,200 sq mi). When findings in the western Estonian islands are included, its extent increases to about 12,200 square kilometres (4,700 sq mi). The thickness of the layer varies from less than 0.5 metres (1 ft 8 in) to a maximum of 8 metres (26 ft) in western Estonia, as does its subsurface depth, which ranges from 10 to 90 metres (33 to 295 ft). It formed some 480 million years ago.

The composition of graptolitic argillite varies by location within Estonia. Its organic content ranges from 10 to 20% and its sulfur content is 2–4%. Correspondingly, its calorific value is 5–8 megajoules per kilogram (MJ/kg) and Fischer Assay oil yield is 3–5%. In northeastern Estonia its carbon-to-hydrogen atomic ratio is about nine. Graptolitic argillite from the northeastern region contains up to 9% pyrite (generally between 2.4 and 6%), heavy metals such as uranium (up to 1,200 parts per million (ppm) or 300 grammes per tonne (g/t)), molybdenum (up to 1,000 ppm or 600 g/t), vanadium (up to 1,600 ppm or 1,200 g/t), and nickel, and other minerals including K-feldspars, quartz, clay minerals, light-brown phosphatic ooids, and accessory amounts of zircon, tourmaline, garnet, rutile, chalcopyrite, and glauconite. Graptolitic argillite from the northwestern region contains fewer metals than are present in deposits in the northeast; it also contains more clay minerals. Rock in these deposits contains corundum, amphiboles, and kyanite.

Geological reserves of graptolitic argillite in Estonia have been estimated at 60–70 billion tonnes. Although the amount of graptolitic argillite exceeds that of kukersite, attempts to use it as an energy source have been unsuccessful due to its low calorific value and high content of sulfur. However, it contains potentially about 2.1 billion tonnes of oil. In addition, graptolitic argillite in Estonia contains 5.67 million tonnes of uranium which makes it one of the main potential future uranium sources in Europe. Graptolitic argillite in Estonia also contains 16.53 million tonnes of zinc and 12.76 million tonnes of molybdenum; however, there is not yet any environmentally friendly and economically feasible technology to extract those metals.

== Citations and references ==
=== Cited sources ===
- Aaloe, Aasa; Bauert, Heikki; Soesoo, Alvar (2007). Kukersite oil shale (PDF). Tallinn: GEOGuide Baltoscandia. ISBN 978-9985-9834-2-3.
- Dover, James H.; Berry, William B.N.; Ross, Reuben James Jr. (1980). Ordovician and Silurian Phi Kappa and Trail Creek formations, Pioneer Mountains, central Idaho; stratigraphic and structural revisions, and new data on graptolite faunas (PDF). Geological Survey Professional Paper. United States Geological Survey.
