= Türisalu Landscape Conservation Area =

Protected area in Estonia

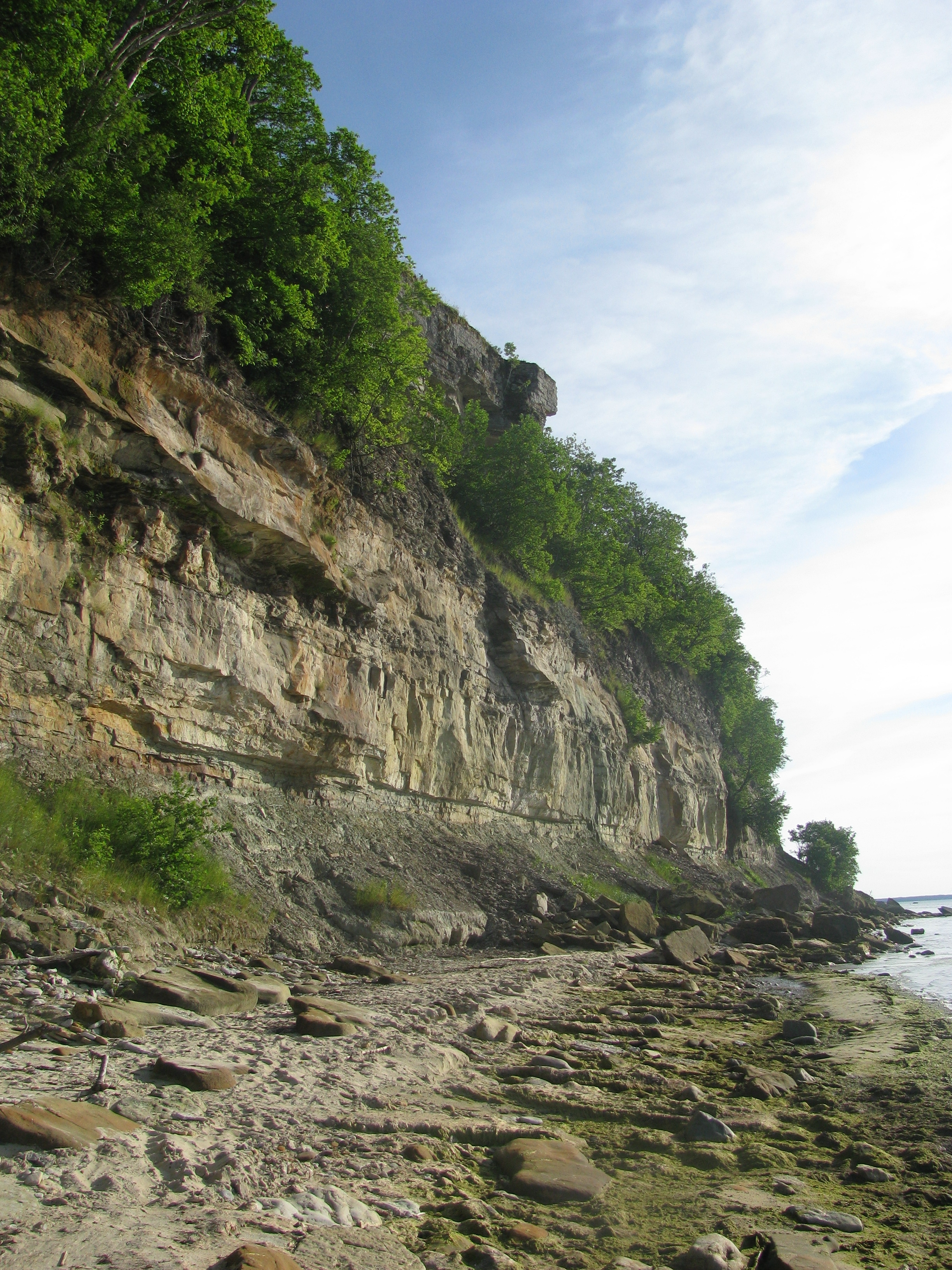

- Location within Estonia
- Location: Estonia
- Coordinates: 59°24′30″N 24°17′30″E
- Area: 97 ha (240 acres)
- Established: 1991 (2005)

Türisalu Landscape Conservation Area is a nature park which is located in Harju County, Estonia.

The area of the nature park is 97 ha.

The protected area was founded in 1991 to protect Türisalu Cliff and its biodiversity. In 2005, the protected area was designated to the landscape conservation area.
