= Kureküla =

Borough in Estonia

- Small borough
- Location in Estonia
- Coordinates: 58°16′29″N 26°11′33″E
- Country: Estonia
- County: Tartu County
- Municipality: Elva Parish
- Time zone: UTC+2 (EET)
  - Summer (DST): UTC+3 (EEST)

Kureküla is a small borough (Estonian: alevik) in Elva Parish, Tartu County, Estonia.

== See also ==
- Kureküla Airfield
