= Mati Meos =

Estonian politician

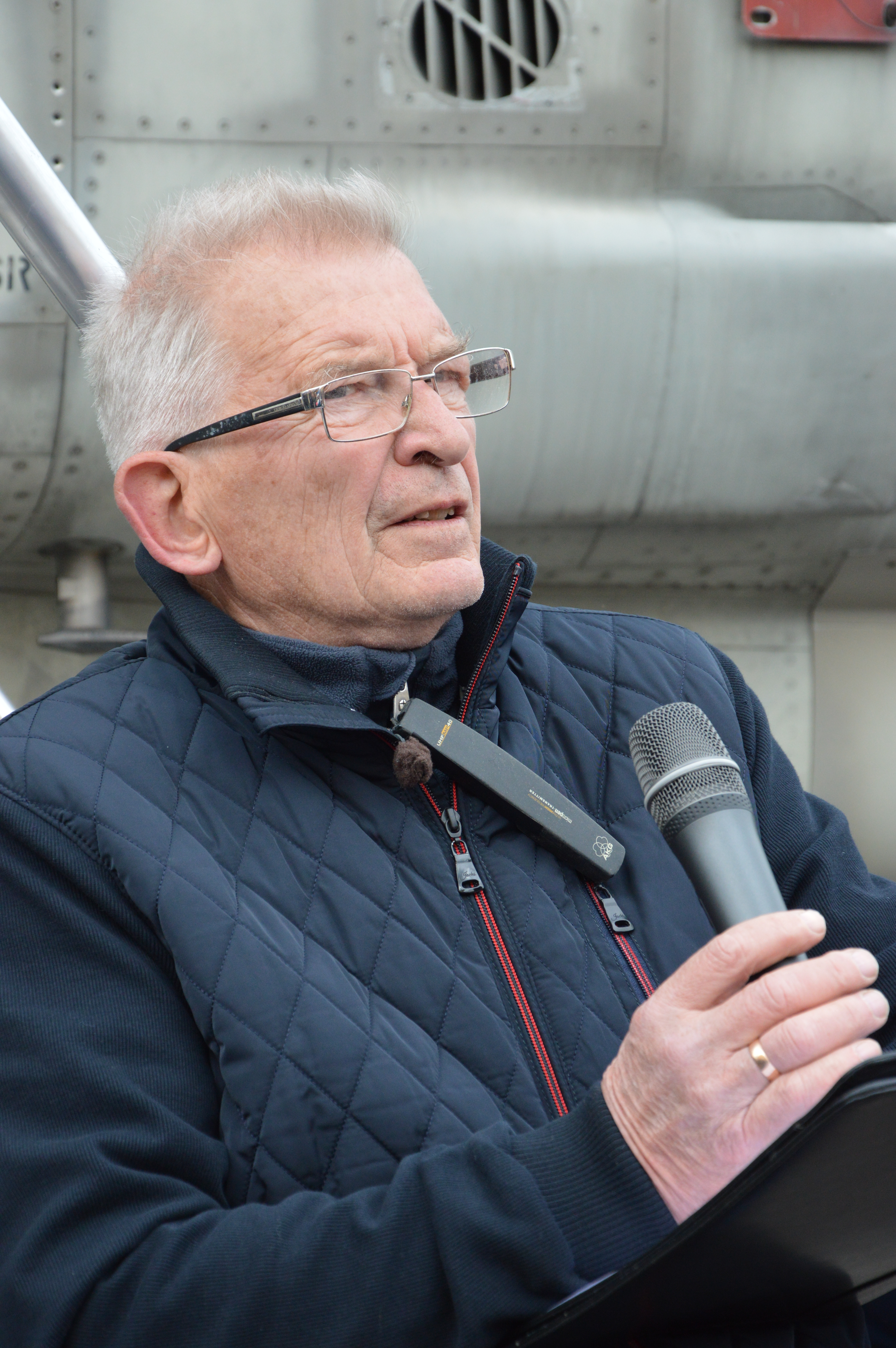
Mati Meos in 2017.

Mati Meos, born 5 October 1946 (age 79) in Jõgeva, is an Estonian politician and engineer. He was a member of VIII Riigikogu, and a director and founder of the Estonian Aviation Museum.
