= Mõnnuste =

Village in Estonia

Coordinates: 58°19′N 22°17′E

- Village
- Interactive map of Mõnnuste
- Country: Estonia
- County: Saare County
- Municipality: Saaremaa Parish
- Time zone: UTC+2 (EET)
  - Summer (DST): UTC+3 (EEST)

Mõnnuste is a village in Saaremaa Parish, Saare County in western Estonia.

It is one of the claimants to the title of the geographical centre of Europe.

Before the administrative reform in 2017, the village was in Lääne-Saare Parish.

== See also ==
- Kogula Airfield
