= Saare, Lääne County =

Village in Estonia

Coordinates: 59°01′25″N 23°34′11″E

Saare
- Village
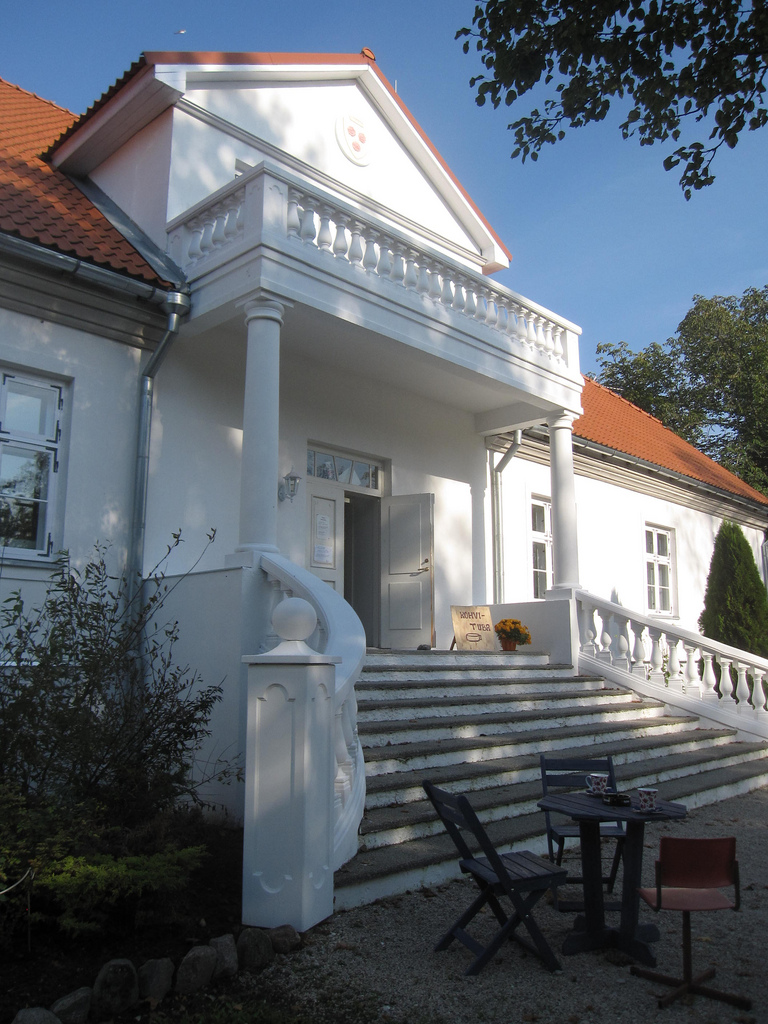
- Saare Manor
- Interactive map of Saare
- Country: Estonia
- County: Lääne County
- Parish: Lääne-Nigula Parish
- Time zone: UTC+2 (EET)
  - Summer (DST): UTC+3 (EEST)

Saare (Swedish: Lyckholm, German: Lückholm) is a village in Lääne-Nigula Parish, Lääne County, in western Estonia.

Private Lyckholm Airfield (ICAO: EELU) is located in the village.

== Saare manor ==
Saare manor was established in 1622. The last owners before the Estonian land reform in 1919 was the von Rosen family. During the 20th century, the manor fell into disrepair and eventually collapsed. Gustav von Rosen, who as a child grew up in the manor house, bought the ruins in 1996 and rebuilt the manor in 2001. Today, there is a visitors' centre for the nearby Silma Nature Reserve located in the manor.
