= Silma Nature Reserve =

Protected area in Estonia

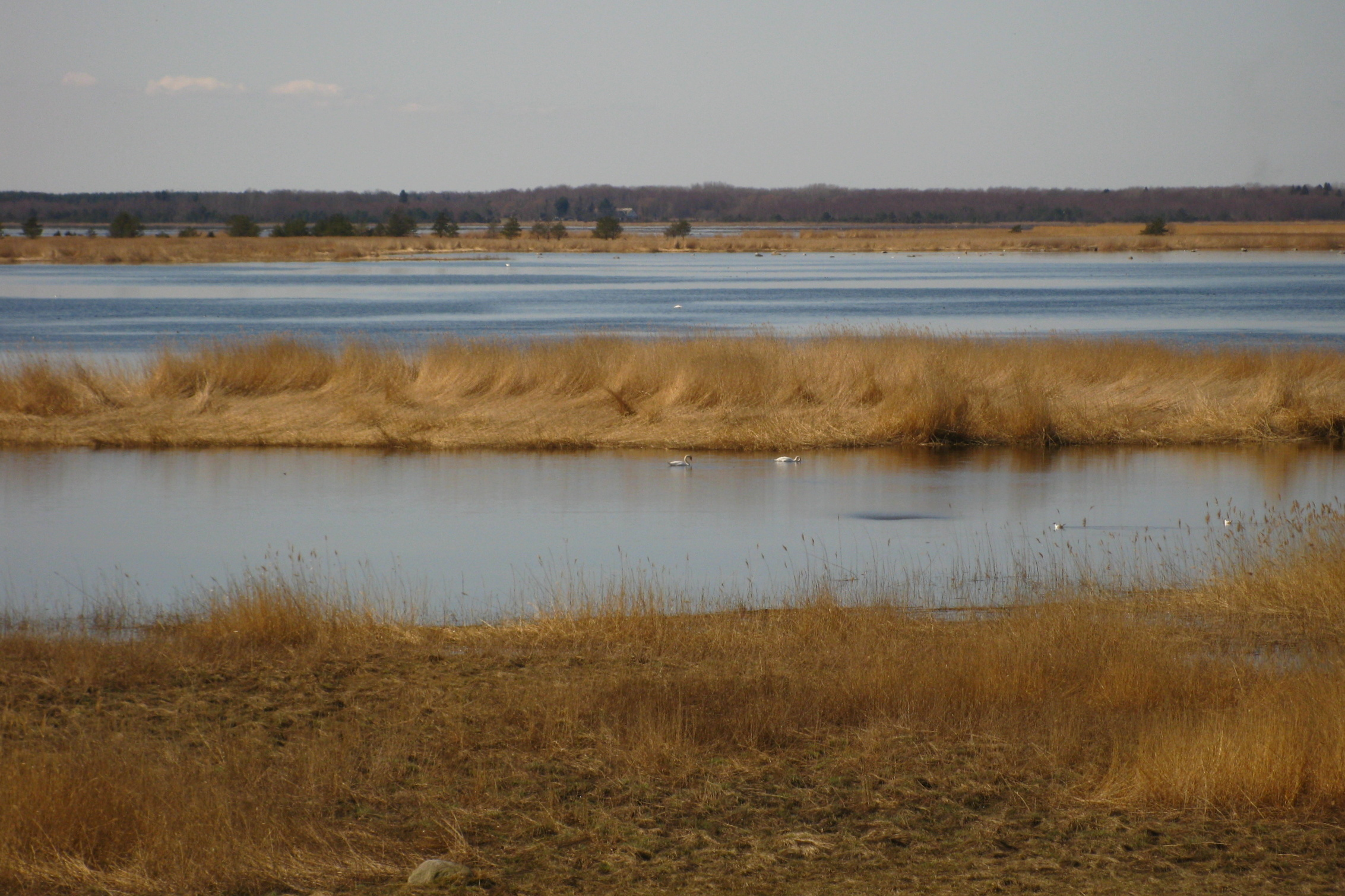
- Saunja Bay

- Location within Estonia
- Location: Estonia
- Nearest city: Haapsalu
- Coordinates: 58°59′50″N 23°38′27″E
- Area: 4,795 ha (11,850 acres)

Silma Nature Reserve is a nature reserve situated in south-western Estonia, in Lääne County.

Silma nature reserve covers a vast expanse of lagoons, waterways, islets and coastal meadows, making the area an ideal stopover for migratory birds, with up to 24 percent of the area covered in reed beds. It is considered the second most important area for birds in Western Estonia, second only to Matsalu National Park, and of international importance. It owes its unusual geographical and natural features to the very strong post-glacial rebound in the area, creating lakes and lagoons of areas that were until recently parts of the sea. In addition to 225 different observed species of birds, the nature reserve also plays a function as a fish spawning area of great ecological value.

Throughout the nature reserve hiking trails and six birdwatching towers have been constructed.
