= Hiiessaare =

Village in Estonia

- Village
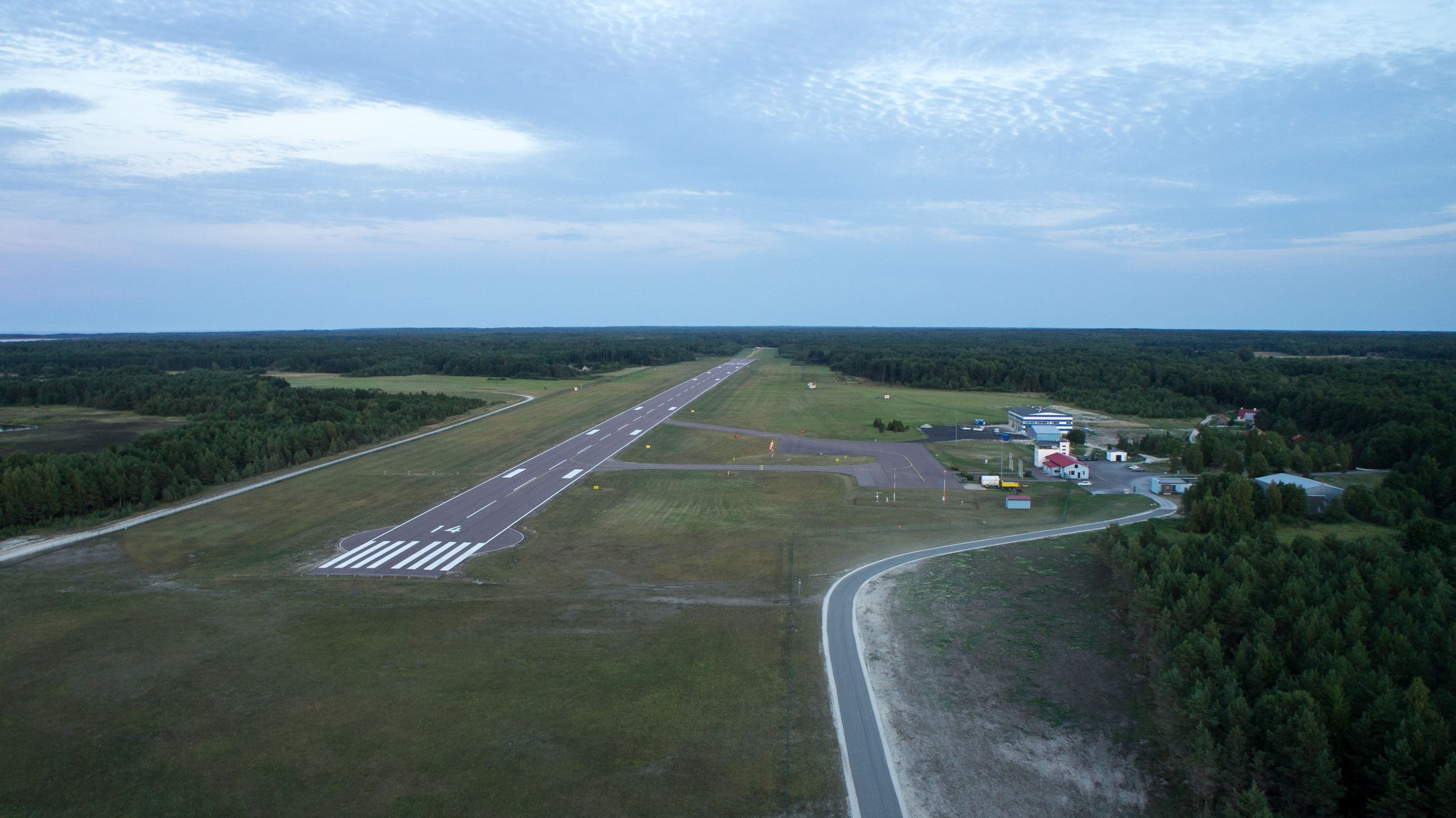
- Kärdla Airport, located in Hiiessaare

- Location within Estonia
- Coordinates: 58°59′35″N 22°50′13″E
- Country: Estonia
- County: Hiiu County
- Parish: Hiiumaa Parish
- Time zone: UTC+2 (EET)
  - Summer (DST): UTC+3 (EEST)

Hiiessaare is a village in Hiiumaa Parish, Hiiu County in northwestern Estonia.

Hiiumaa's only airport, Kärdla Airport (ICAO: EEKA), is located in Hiiesaare.

The village was first mentioned in 1798 (Hio). Historically, the village was part of Suuremõisa Manor (German: Grossenhof).
