= Rääbise Airfield =

Defunct airfield in Estonia

Rääbise Airfield (Estonian: Rääbise lennuväli) was an airfield in Jõgeva County, Estonia.

The airfield was built between 1975 and 1985 by Soviet Union. The airfield was used for agricultural activities.
