= Nässuma Airfield =

Airfield in Estonia

Nässuma Airfield Nässuma lennuväli
- IATA: none; ICAO: none

Summary
- Owner: Maret Allik
- Coordinates: 58°17′06″N 22°48′31″E

Maps
- Location in Estonia
- Location in Nässuma

Runways
Direction	Length		Surface
Direction	ft	m	Surface
			Asphalt/concrete

Nässuma Airfield (Estonian: Nässuma lennuväli; also Nässuma Airstrip) is an airfield (airstrip) in Nässuma, Saare County, Estonia.

The airfield's owner is Maret Allik, code LCL: AG1192.
