= Lyckholm Airfield =

Airfield in Estonia

Coordinates: 59°01′21″N 023°34′36″E

Lyckholm Airfield (Estonian: Lyckholmi lennuväli; ICAO: EELU) is an airfield in Saare, Lääne County, Estonia.

The airfield's owner is Herbert Trisberg.
