= Türisalu =

Village in Estonia

- Village
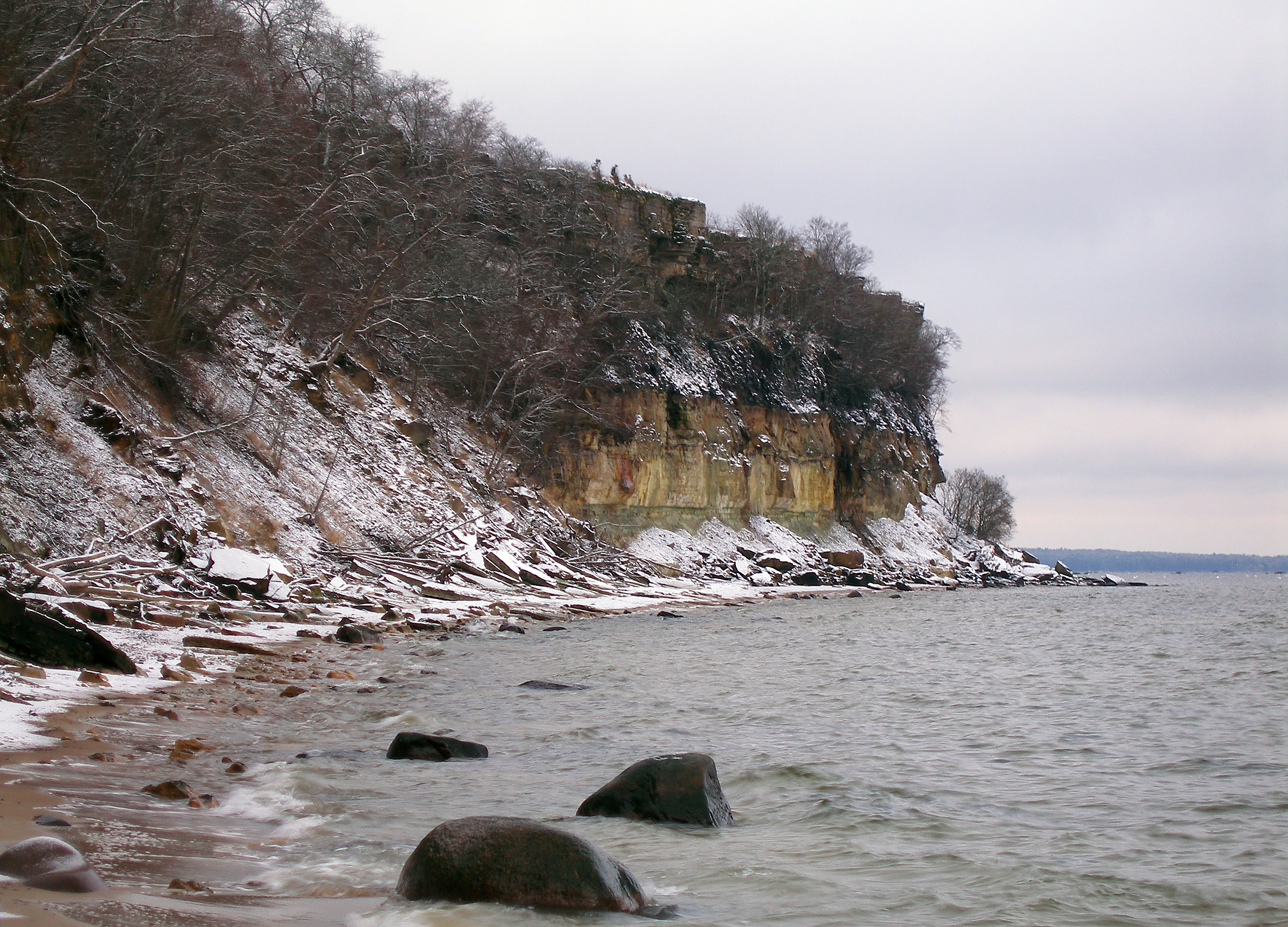
- Türisalu Cliff

- Location in Estonia
- Coordinates: 59°24′38″N 24°18′32″E
- Country: Estonia
- County: Harju County
- Municipality: Harku Parish

Population (01.06.2010)
  - Total: 499

Türisalu is a village in Harku Parish, Harju County in northern Estonia. It has a population of 499 (as of 1 June 2010).

== Geography ==
An infamous site of suicides, Türisalu Cliff, is located in the village.

== Name ==
Türisalu was attested in historical sources as Thuriselle in 1378 and Тюрисаль (Tyurisal′) c. 1900. The linguist Lauri Kettunen compared the name Türisalu with the Ingrian place name Tyrö, which he considered to be primarily derived from a personal name, as well as the personal name Turo. In a footnote he also mentioned the Estonian words türa 'penis' (cf. Finnish: tyrä 'hernia'), türi-lind 'little curlew', and türi-luu 'lower part of the spine', as well as the Finnish dialect words tyreikkö and tureikko 'thick forest, thicket' as possibly related.

== See also ==
- Keila-Joa Airfield
