= Estonian Aviation Museum =

Museum in Estonia

- Eesti Lennundusmuuseum
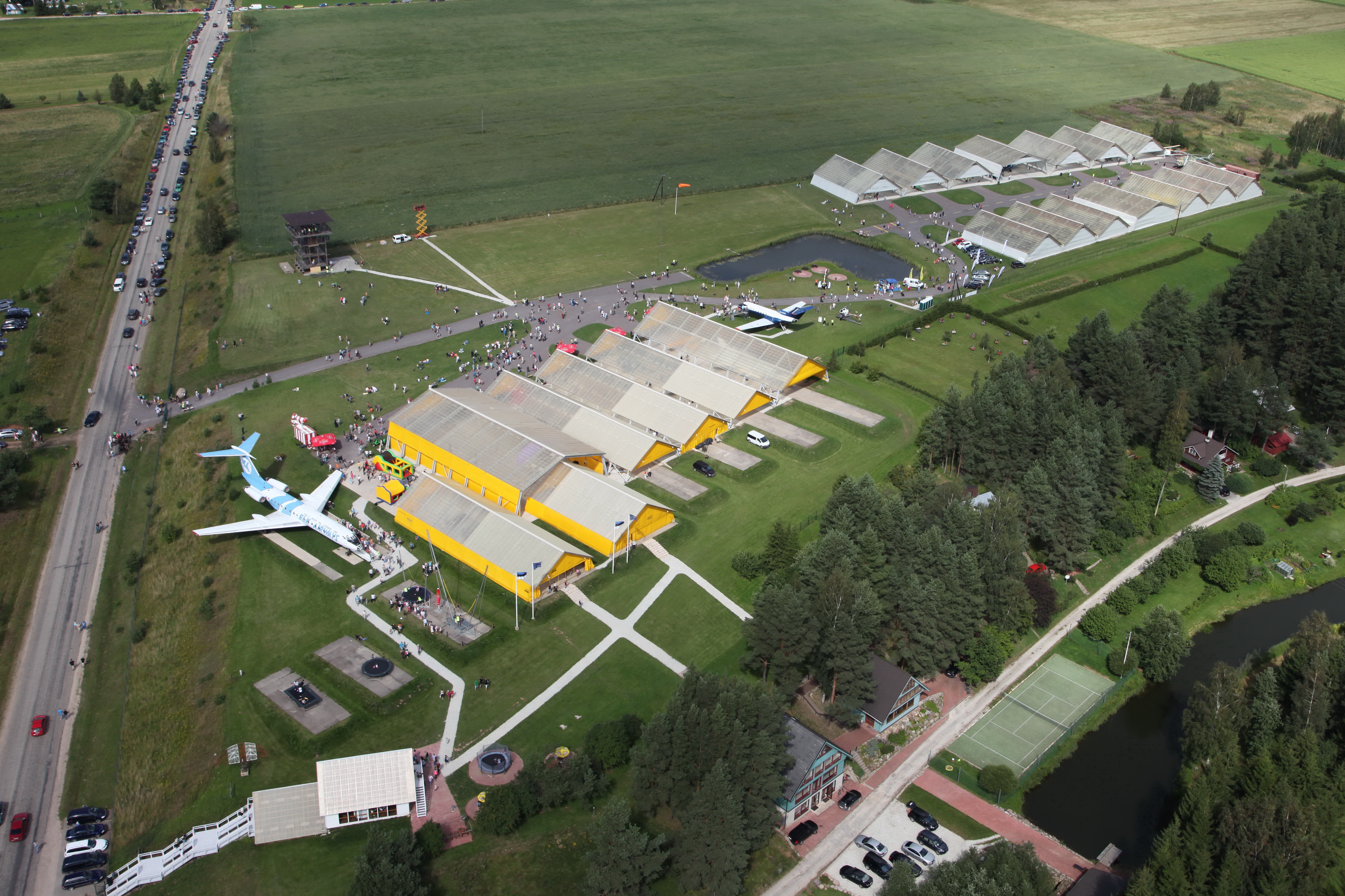
- Estonian Aviation Museum (2012)
- Established: 14 June 2002
- Location: Veskiorg 1, Lange, Haaslava Parish, 62115 Tartu County, Estonia
- Coordinates: 58°17′16.5″N 26°45′51″E
- Type: Aviation museum
- Founder: Mati Meos
- Director: Mati Meos
- Website: lennundusmuuseum.ee

The Estonian Aviation Museum (Estonian: Eesti Lennundusmuuseum) is located in Lange near Tartu in Estonia. It is the only aviation museum in the country.

The museum was founded in December 1999 in accordance with a private initiative procedure and officially opened to the public on 14 June 2002. It has been developed in different stages on the basis of European Union support financing and with the help of the private- and public sector.

Founder and director of the museum is Estonian engineer and former politician Mati Meos.

The museum consists of several buildings; one small building is used to present more than 400 aircraft models. A collection of military aircraft, airliners, training aircraft, ultralight aircraft, helicopters, gliders, aircraft engines, radar units and anti-aircraft guns is displayed in and around several hangars. There are also various attractions such as piloting- and parachute jumping simulators.

The museum has its own 450m-long airstrip. Tartu Ülenurme Airport is located 4 km away.

The Museum has staged the annual Estonian Aviation Days since 2006. The museum claims it is the biggest aviation event in the Baltic states. Estonian Aviation Days 2016 had the attendance of 13 000 people.

The Museum is closed in wintertime from November to May.

== Departments ==
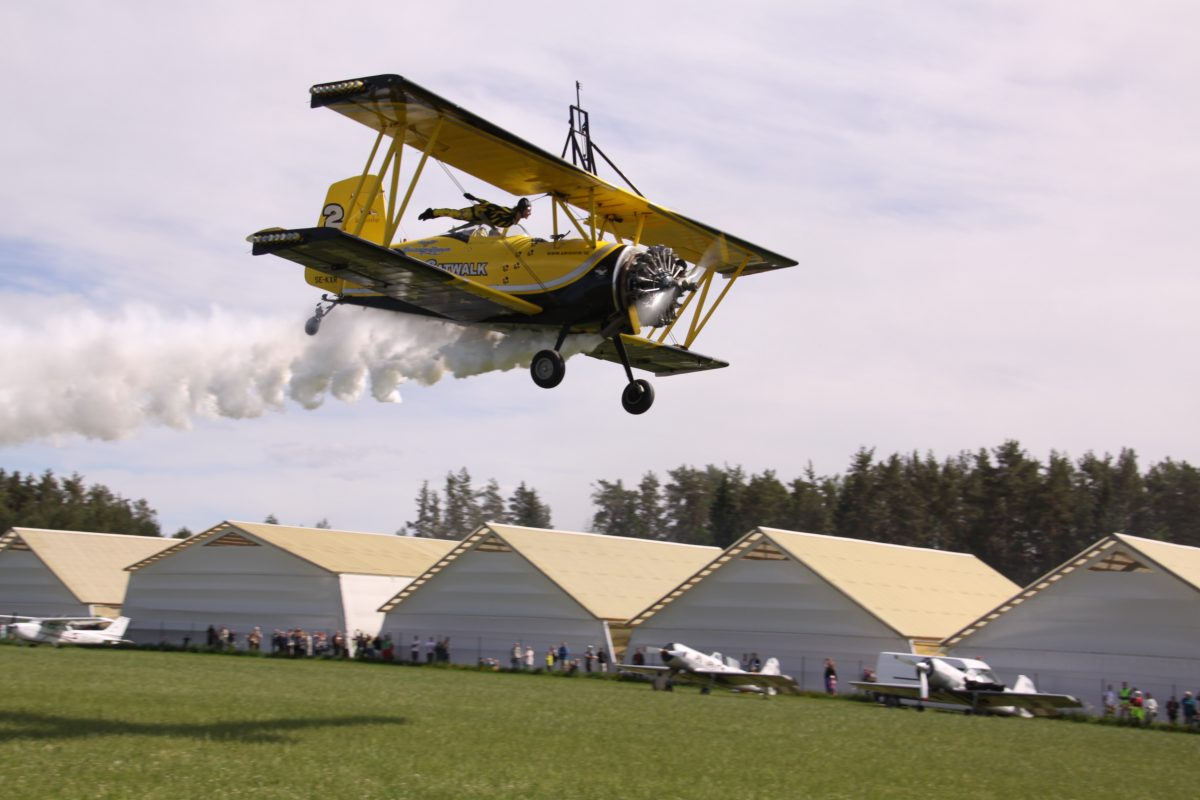
Scandinavian Airshow "Skycats" during Estonian Aviation Days 2016.

In the Museum structure there are 8 departments:

- Aircraft models
- Aircraft, helicopters and gliders
- Aircraft engines
- Marine airforce
- Air traffic control (ATC), radars
- Airfields
- Air defence
- Attractions

== Collection ==
Training aircraft

- PZL-104 Wilga
- PZL TS-11 Iskra (from Polish Air Force)
- Aero L-29 Delfín
- Aero L-39 Albatros
- Hawk HW-326 (from Finnish Air Force)

Ultra-light aircraft

- Aeroprakt A-22 Foxbat (flying as of July 2025; registration ES-ULM; serial number 114)

Fighters

- Panavia Tornado F.3 (from Royal Air Force)
- F-104 ASA Starfighter (from Italian Air Force)
- MiG-21bis (from Polish Air Force)
- Saab J35 Draken (owned by Swedish Air Force Museum)
- MiG-23MLD
- Saab JA 37 Viggen (owned by Swedish Air Force Museum)
- SEPECAT Jaguar GR3 (from Royal Air Force)

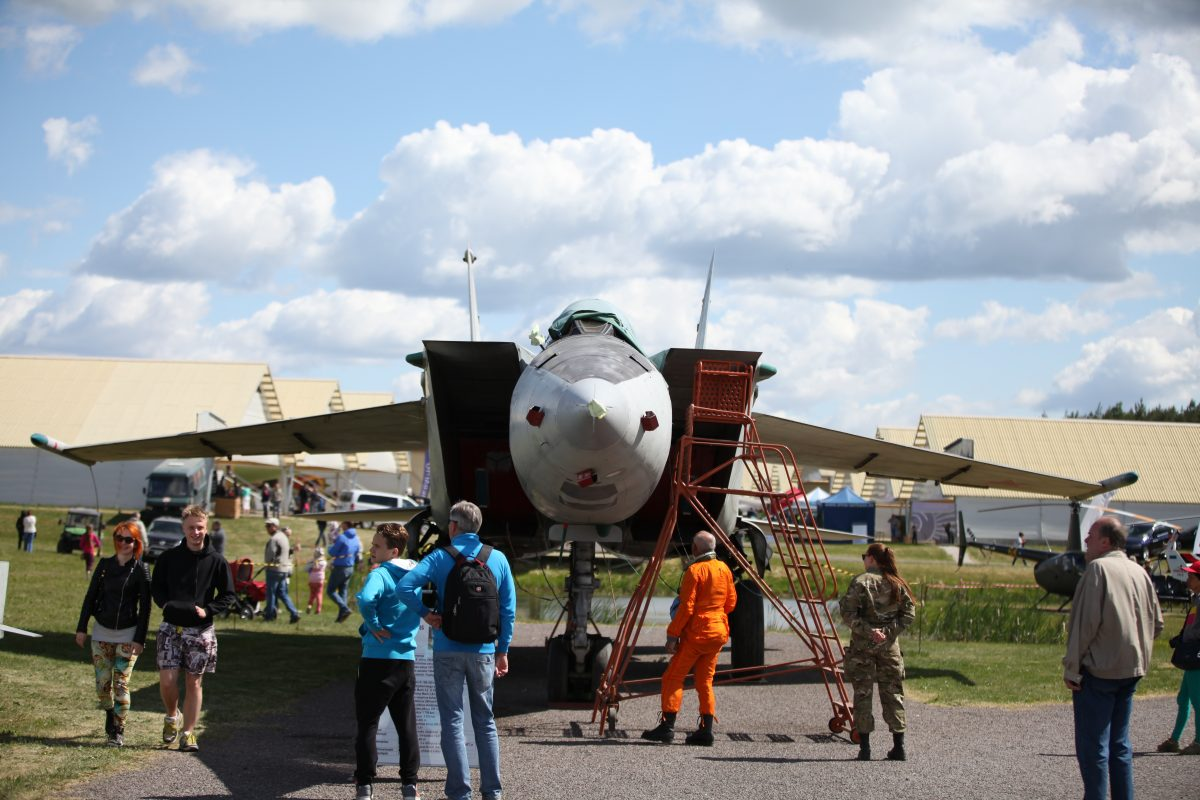
Primary presentation of MiG-25 during Estonian Aviation Days 2016.

Reconnaissance fighters

- Mirage III RS (from the Ministry of Defence of Switzerland)
- MiG-25 RPS
- Yak-28PP

Attack fighters

- Saab J32 Lansen (owned by Swedish Air Force Museum)
- Sukhoi Su-22M4
- F-4 Phantom II

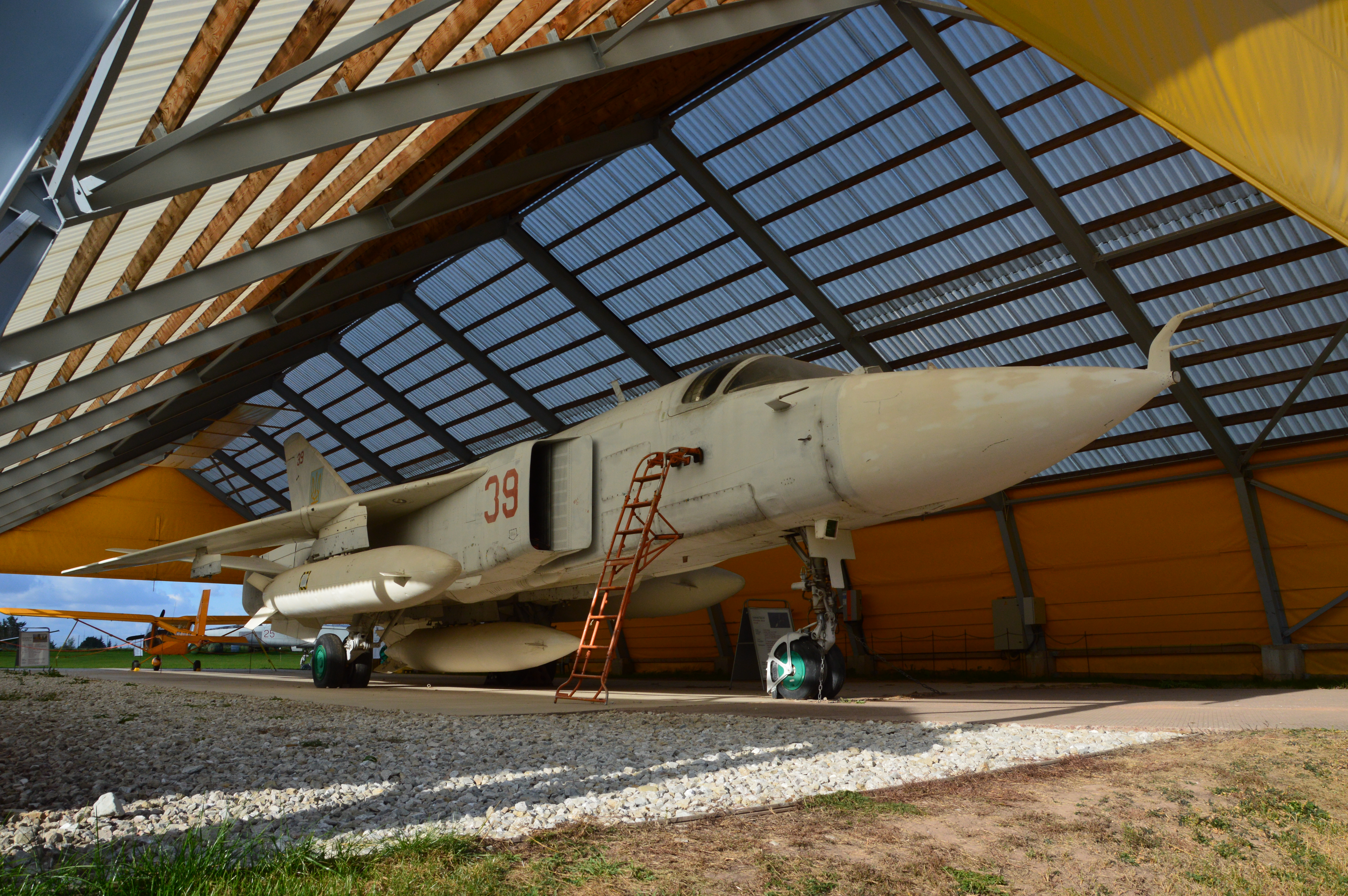
Sukhoi Su-24

Bombers

- Sukhoi Su-24

Gliders

- Blaník
- LAK-12

Agricultural aircraft

- Zlín Z 37
- Antonov An-2

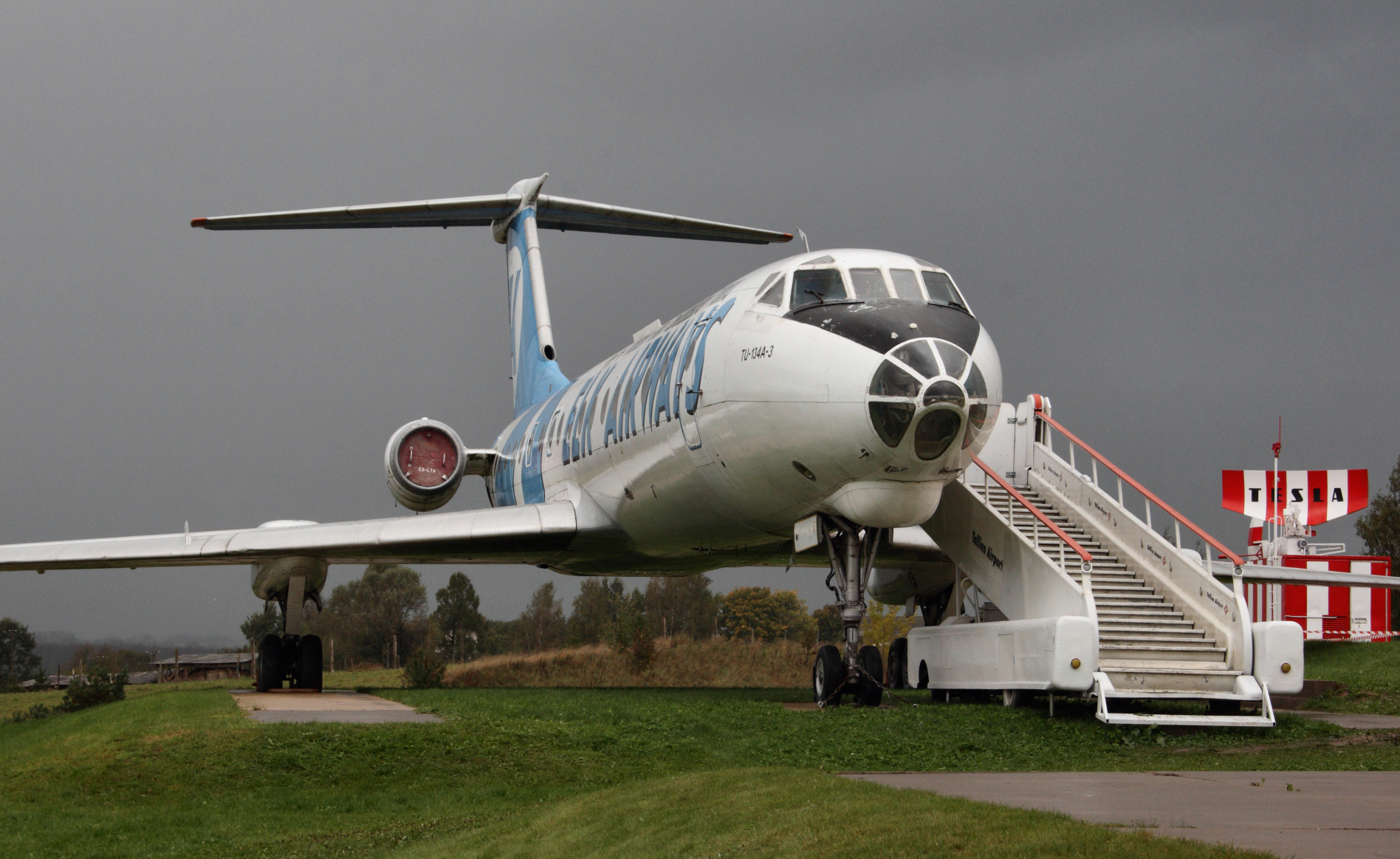
ELK Airways Tupolev Tu-134A on display at Estonian Aviation Museum.

Passenger aircraft

- Tu-134A3
- Yak-40
- An-2P
- Aero Commander 680 FL

Helicopters

- Mil Mi-2RL
- Mil Mi-8
- Robinson R22 (without engine)
- Robinson R44 (from Estonian Air Force)
- Schweizer S-300
- Kamov Ka-26

Anti-aircraft missiles

- Anti-aircraft cannon Flack 88
- Danish anti-aircraft cannon Madsen
- Surface-to-air missile S-75
- Surface-to-air missile S-125
- Surface-to-air missile S-200
- Surface-to-air missile SA-6
- Surface-to-air missile SA-8

Radars

- Remote monitoring radar P-37 (similar to P-35)
- Jak-28PP radar
- Draken-35 radar
- Il-76 radar
- Tesla OPRL-4 radar (from Kuressaare airfield)
- Antenna of DRL-7SK radar (from Tartu Ülenurme airfield)
- PN-671 precision approach radar

Engines

- Jak-28PP engine
- Il-76 engine
- F-104 ASA Starfighter engine
- Lansen-32 engine
- MiG-25 engine
- R44 engine
- Wilga 35 engine
- An-2 engine
- In-line engine of a recreational aircraft
- Mi-2 turbine
- S-75 rocket engine

Aircraft models

Aircraft models in scales 1:144, 1:72, 1:48 and 1:32, in total 400 models. Models of aircraft carrier and amphibious assault ship in scale 1:72. Launchers models in scale 1:72.
