= Lange, Estonia =

Village in Estonia

Coordinates: 58°18′N 26°46′E

- Village
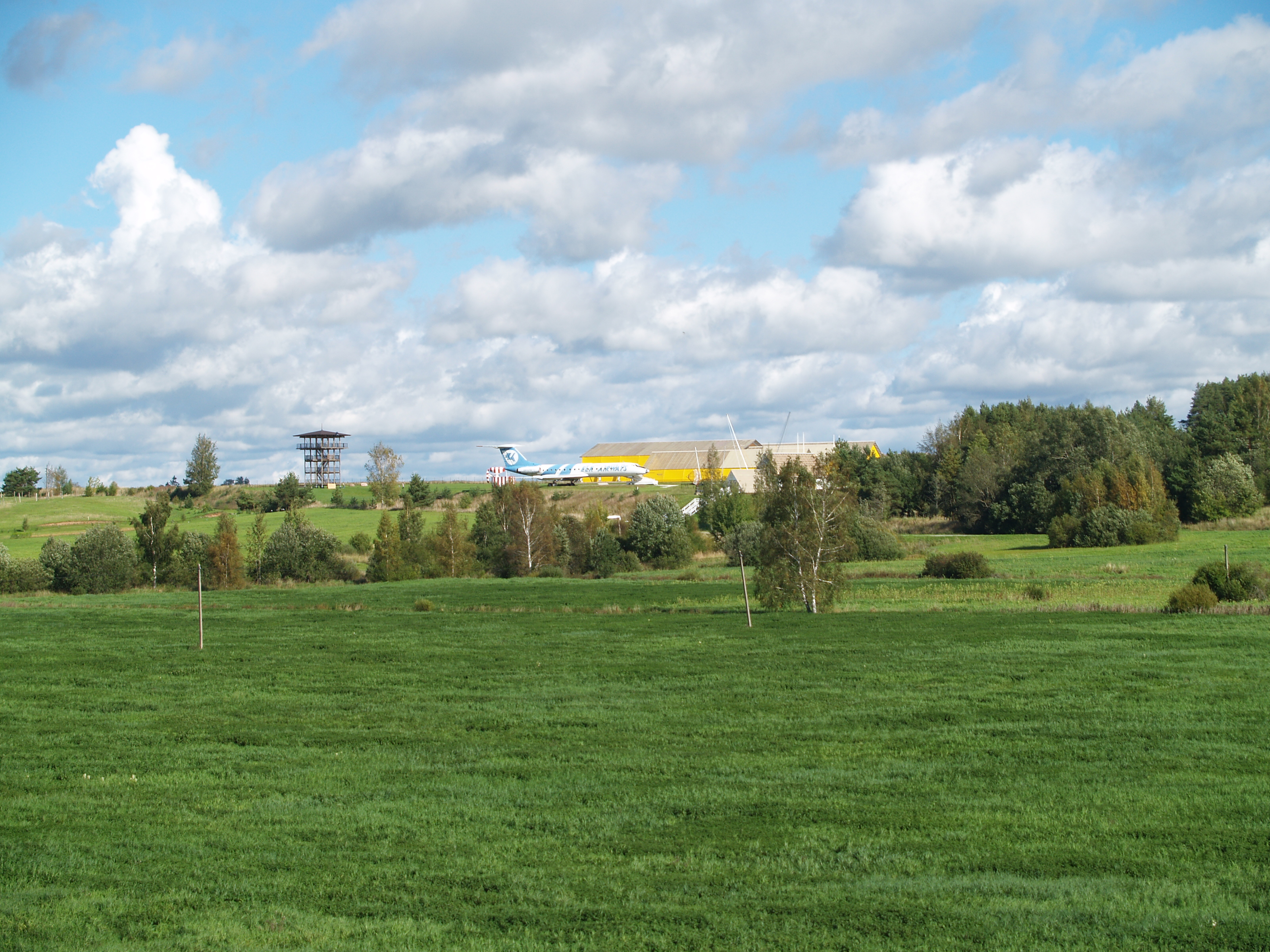
- Interactive map of Lange, Estonia
- Country: Estonia
- County: Tartu County
- Parish: Kastre Parish
- Time zone: UTC+2 (EET)
  - Summer (DST): UTC+3 (EEST)

Lange is a village in Kastre Parish, Tartu County in eastern Estonia.

Estonian Aviation Museum and Lange motocenter are located in the village.

== Gallery ==
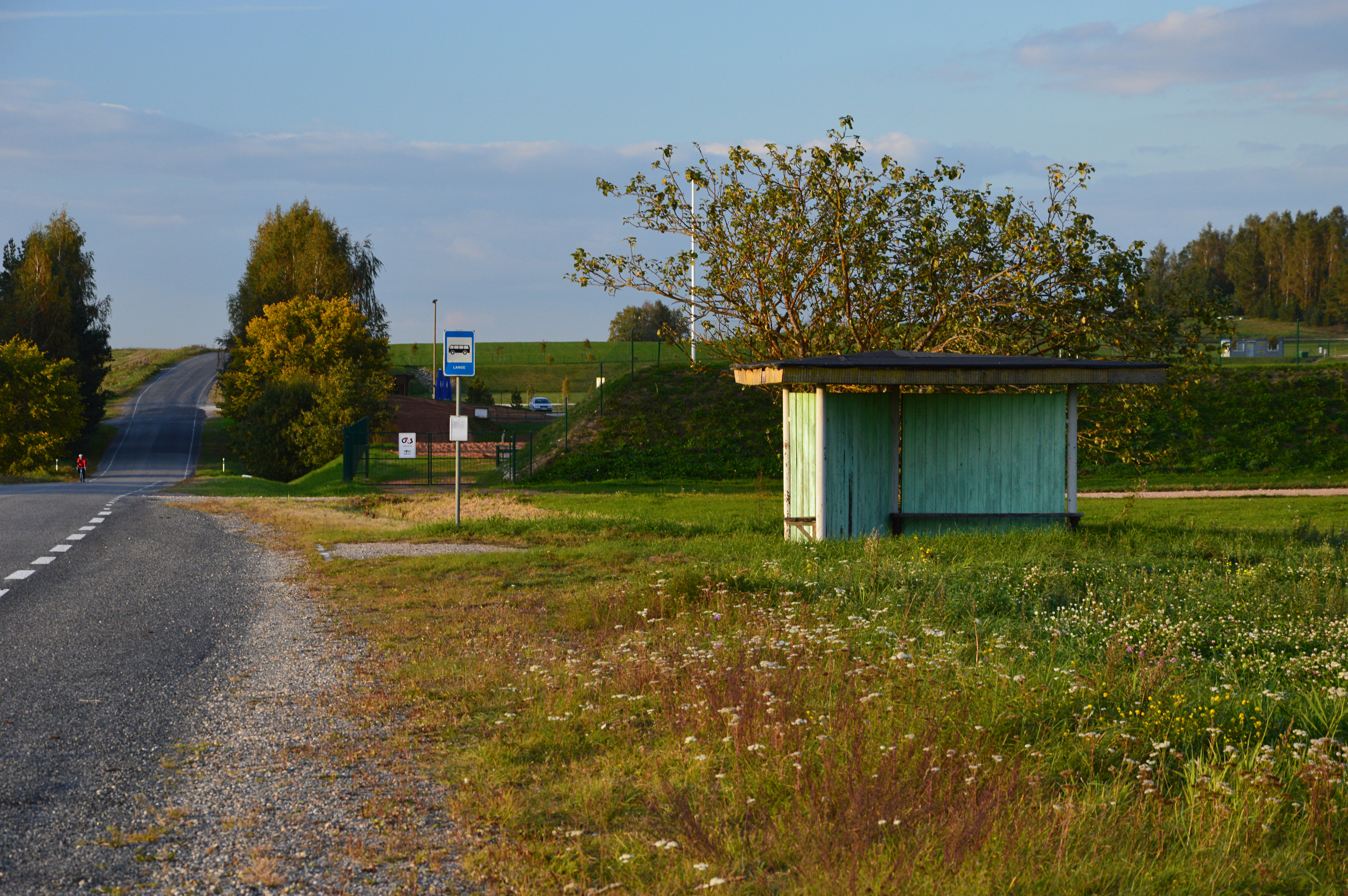

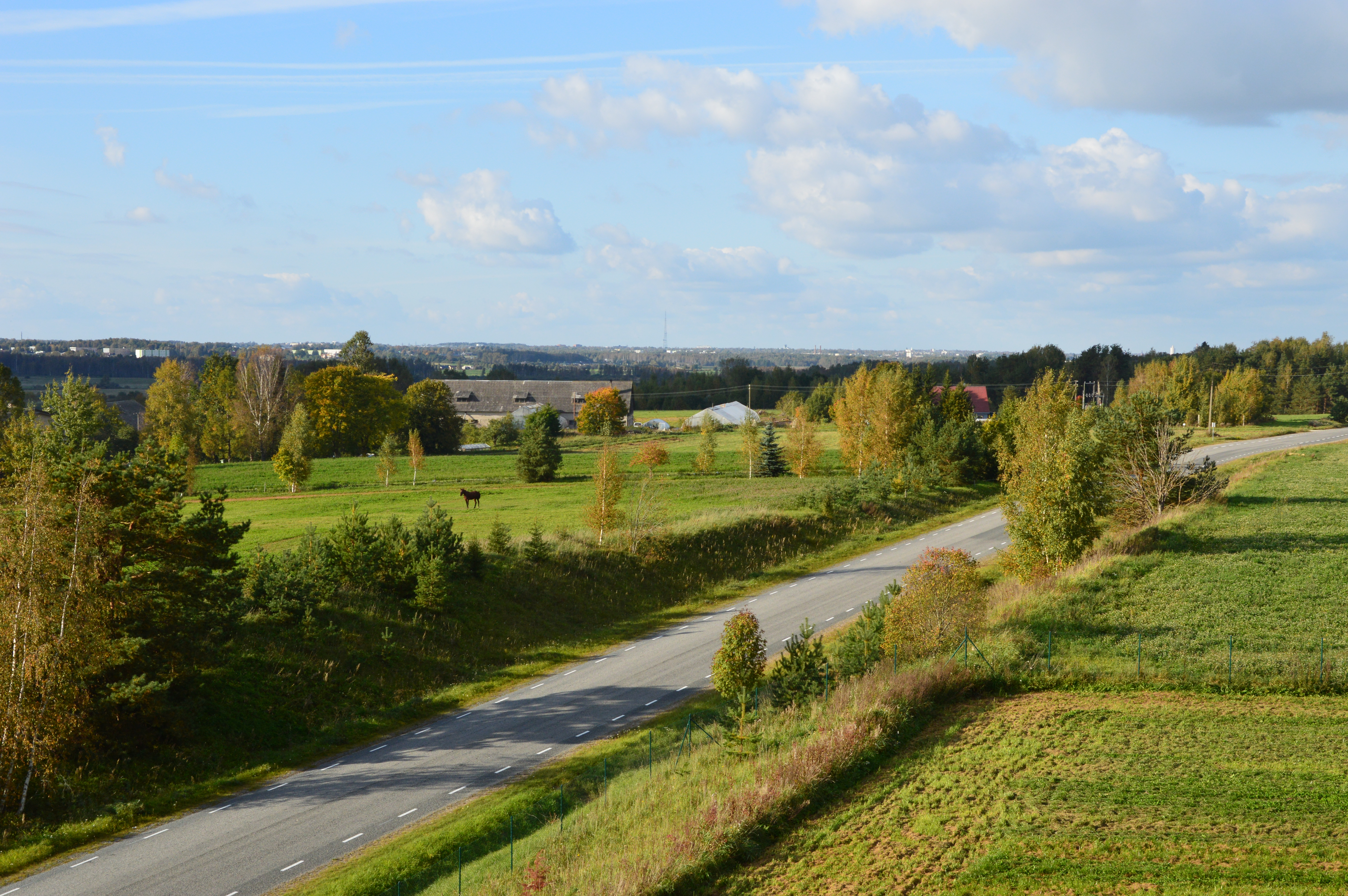

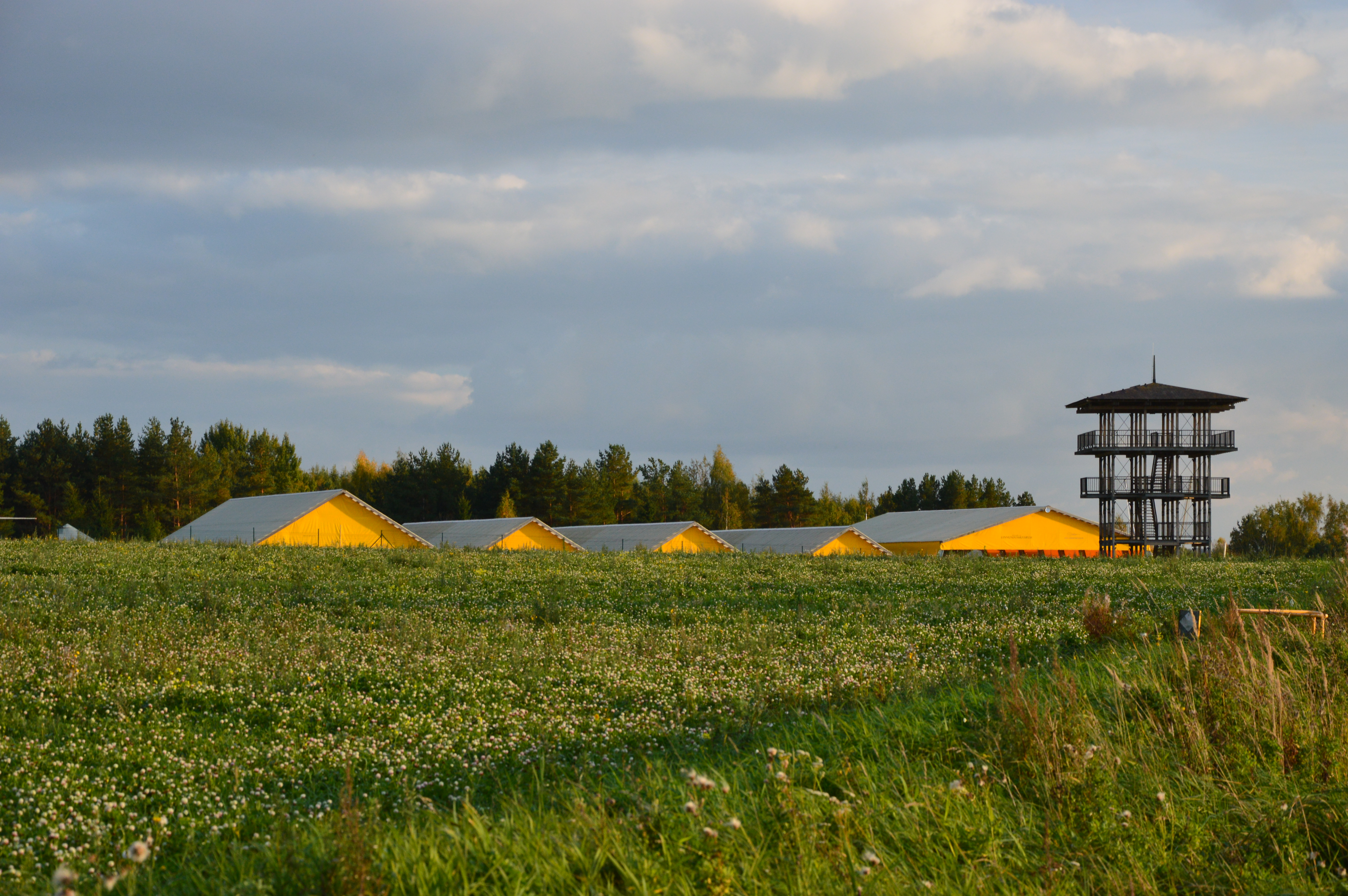

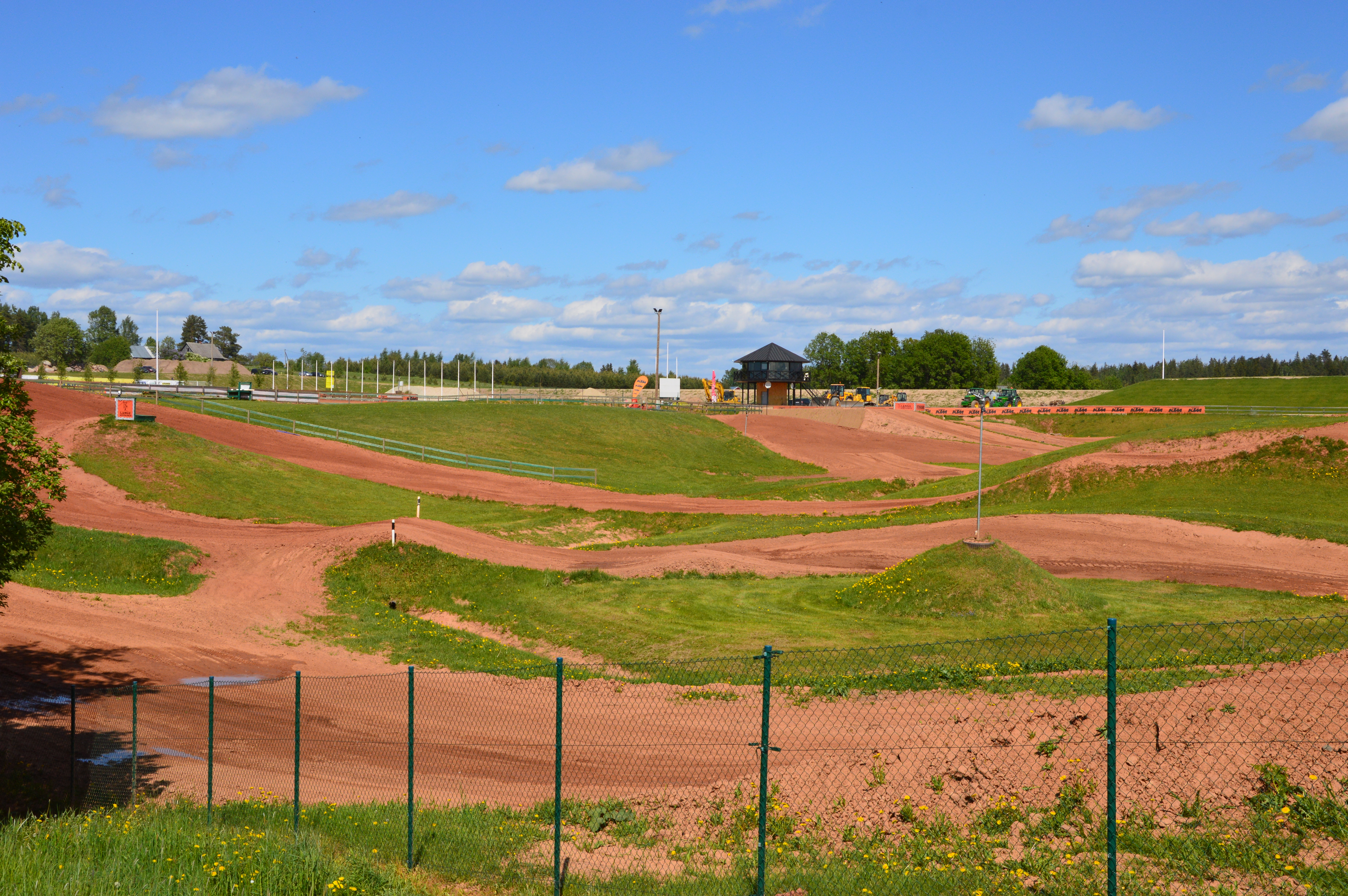
