= Kogula Airfield =

Airfield in Estonia

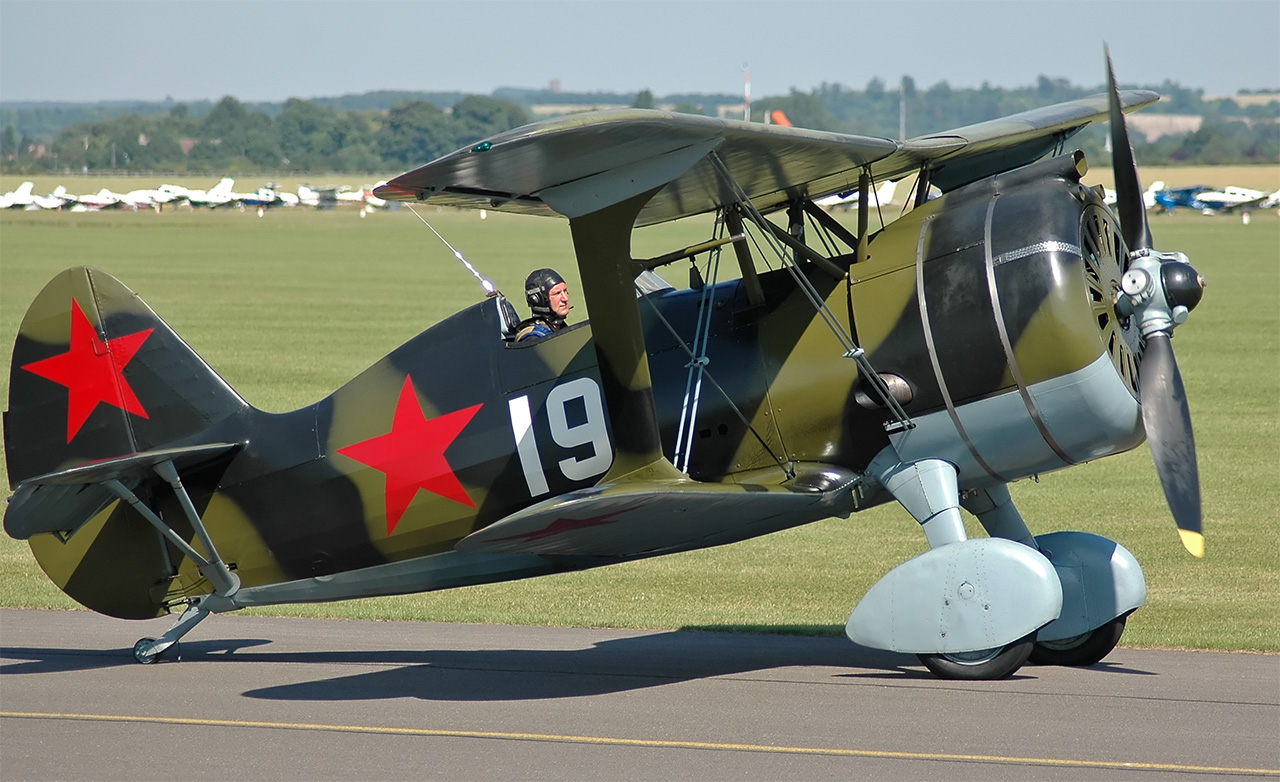

Kogula Airfield (Estonian: Kogula lennuväli) was an airfield in Saare County, Estonia.

The airfield was built before 1941. During WWII the airfield was used by the Soviet Naval Air Force to bomb Berlin.
