= Iira =

Village in Estonia

Coordinates: 58°59′N 24°43′E

- Village
- Interactive map of Iira
- Country: Estonia
- County: Rapla County
- Parish: Rapla Parish
- Time zone: UTC+2 (EET)
  - Summer (DST): UTC+3 (EEST)

Iira is a village in Rapla Parish, Rapla County in northwestern Estonia.

Rapla Airfield (Kuusiku Airfield) (ICAO: EERA) is located in Iira.
