= Rapla Airfield =

Airfield in Estonia

Rapla Airfield Rapla lennuväli
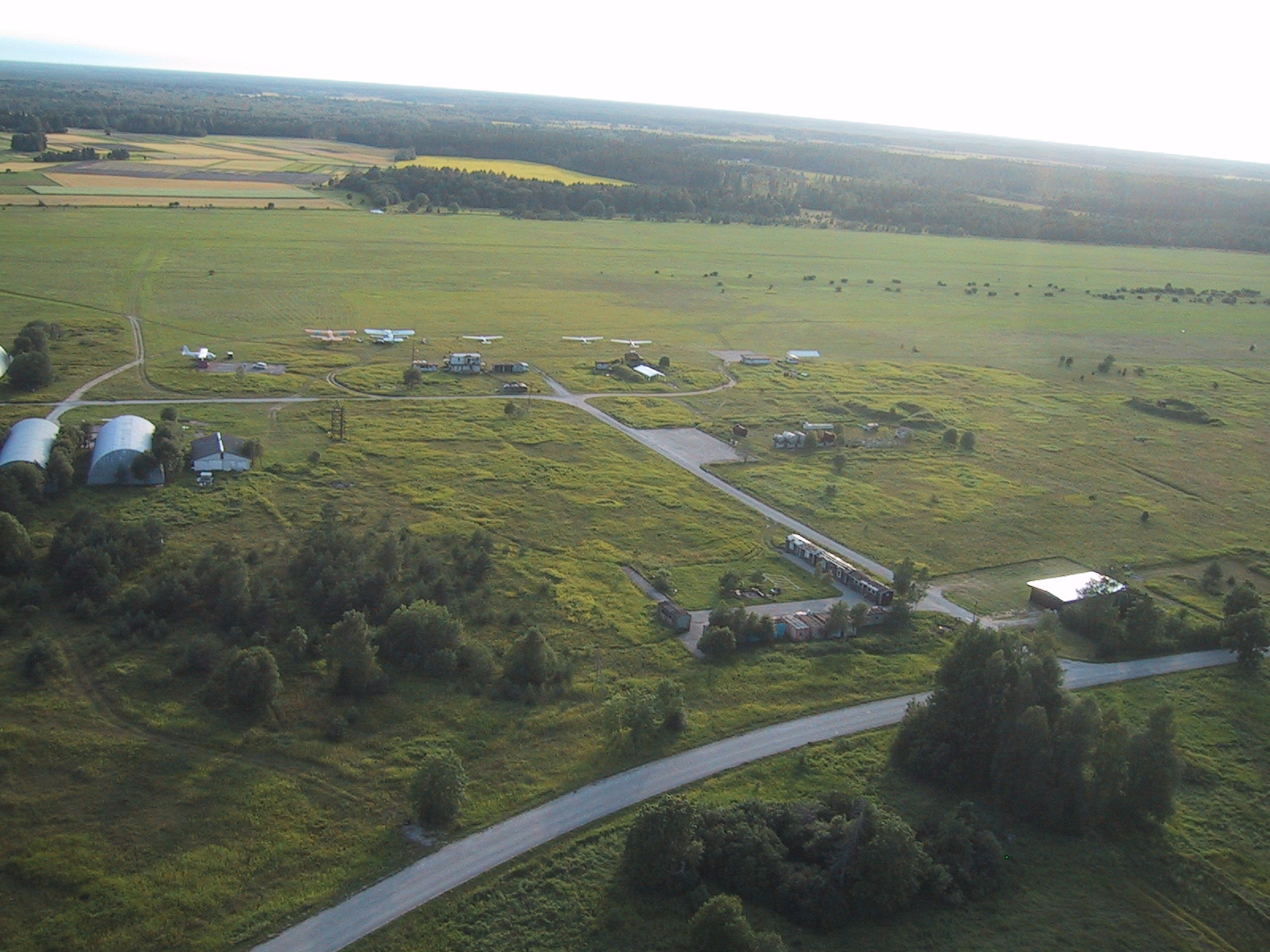
- IATA: none; ICAO: EERA

Summary
- Location: Iira, Rapla Parish
- Elevation AMSL: 216 ft / 66 m
- Coordinates: 58°59′11″N 024°43′28″E
- Website: https://raplaairfield.ee

Map
- Location in Estonia

Runways
Direction	Length		Surface
Direction	m	ft	Surface
15R/33L	1,600	5,249	Grass
15L/33R	1,100	3,609	Grass
- Sources

Rapla Airfield (ICAO: EERA) (also known as Kuusiku Airfield) is an airfield in Estonia. It is located in Iira village near the town of Rapla, about 50 km (31 mi) from the capital Tallinn. Rapla Airfield is considered one of the centres of Estonian skydiving and private aviation.

The airfield has two 60 m (200 ft) wide parallel grass-covered runways: 15L/33R 1,100 m (3,600 ft) and 15R/33L 1,600 m (5,200 ft).

Rapla Airfield is used mainly as a drop zone by skydivers, by small airplane and ultra-light owners, by model plane pilots, by hang-glider and glider pilots and by powered para-glider pilots.

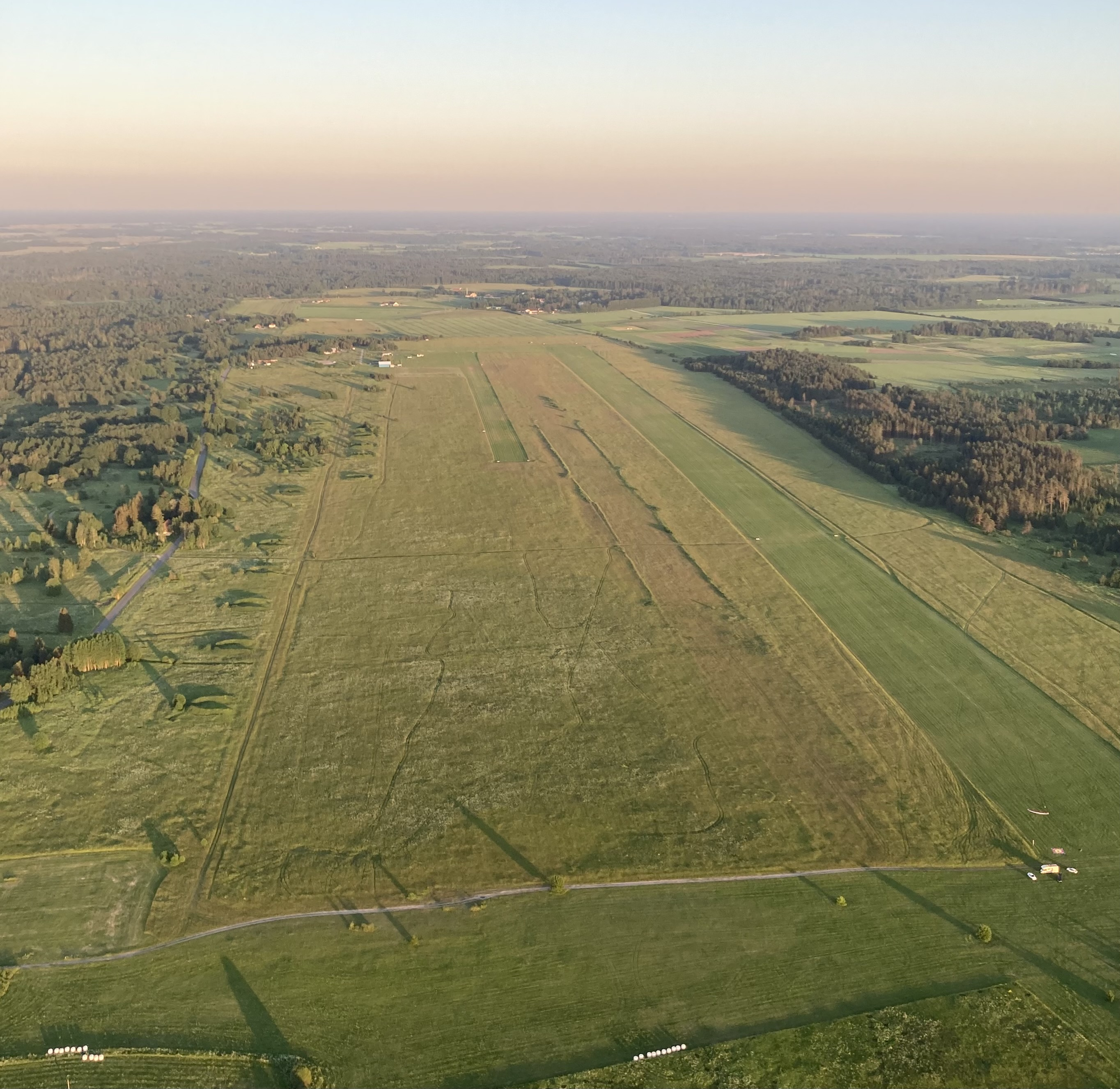
Kuusiku lennuväli (EERA) 18.06.2021
