= Keila-Joa Airfield =

Airfield in Estonia

Keila-Joa Airfield (Estonian: Keila-Joa lennuväli) was an airfield in Harju County, Estonia.

The airfield was built in the 1920s. During WWII, the airfield was used by the Luftwaffe. During the Soviet era, the airfield was used by the Soviet Air Defence Force - 94th Anti-Aircraft Rocket Brigade. In the beginning of the 1990s, the airfield was abandoned.
