= Türisalu Cliff =

Cliff in Estonia

Coordinates: 59°25′13″N 24°19′19″E

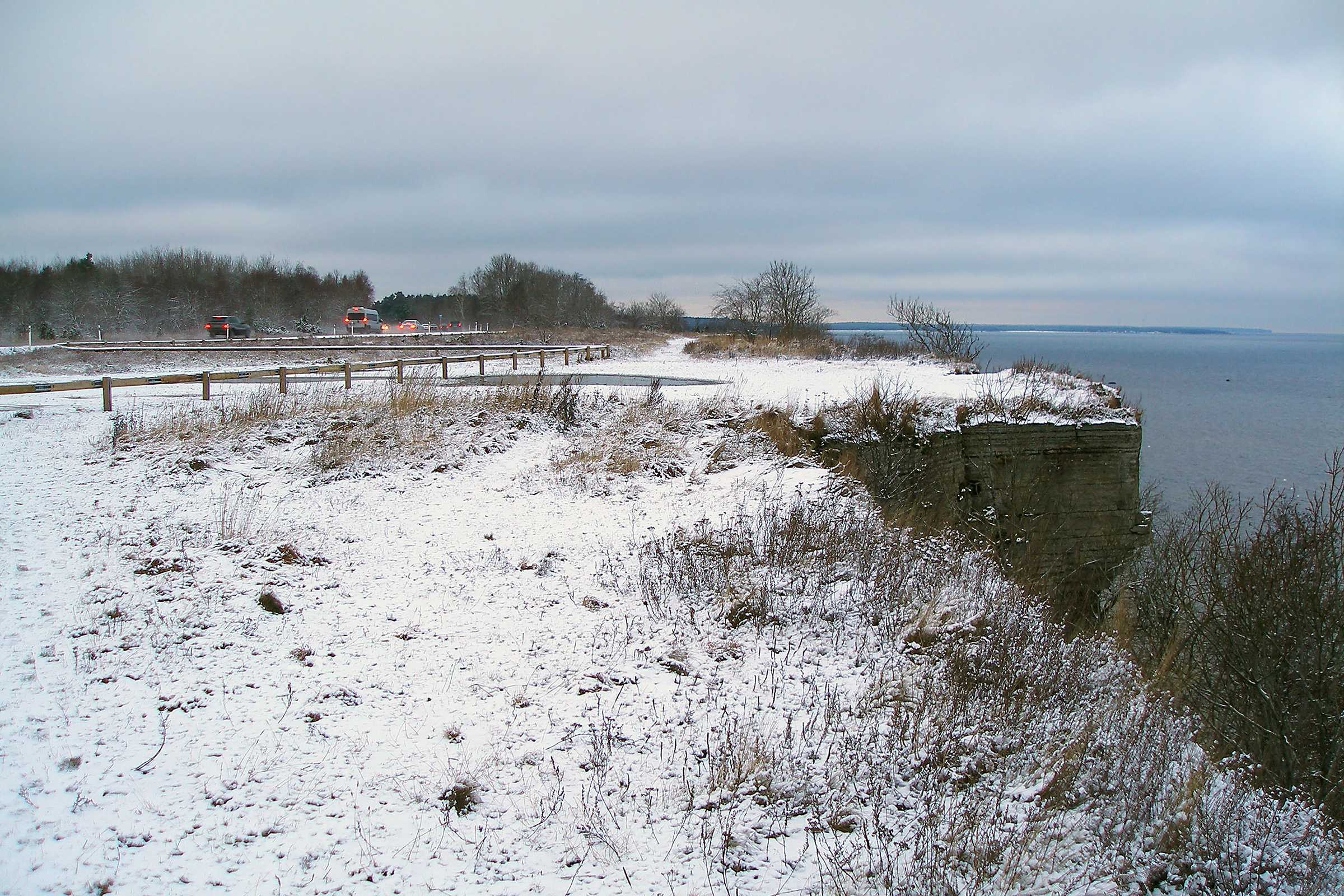
Türisalu Cliff

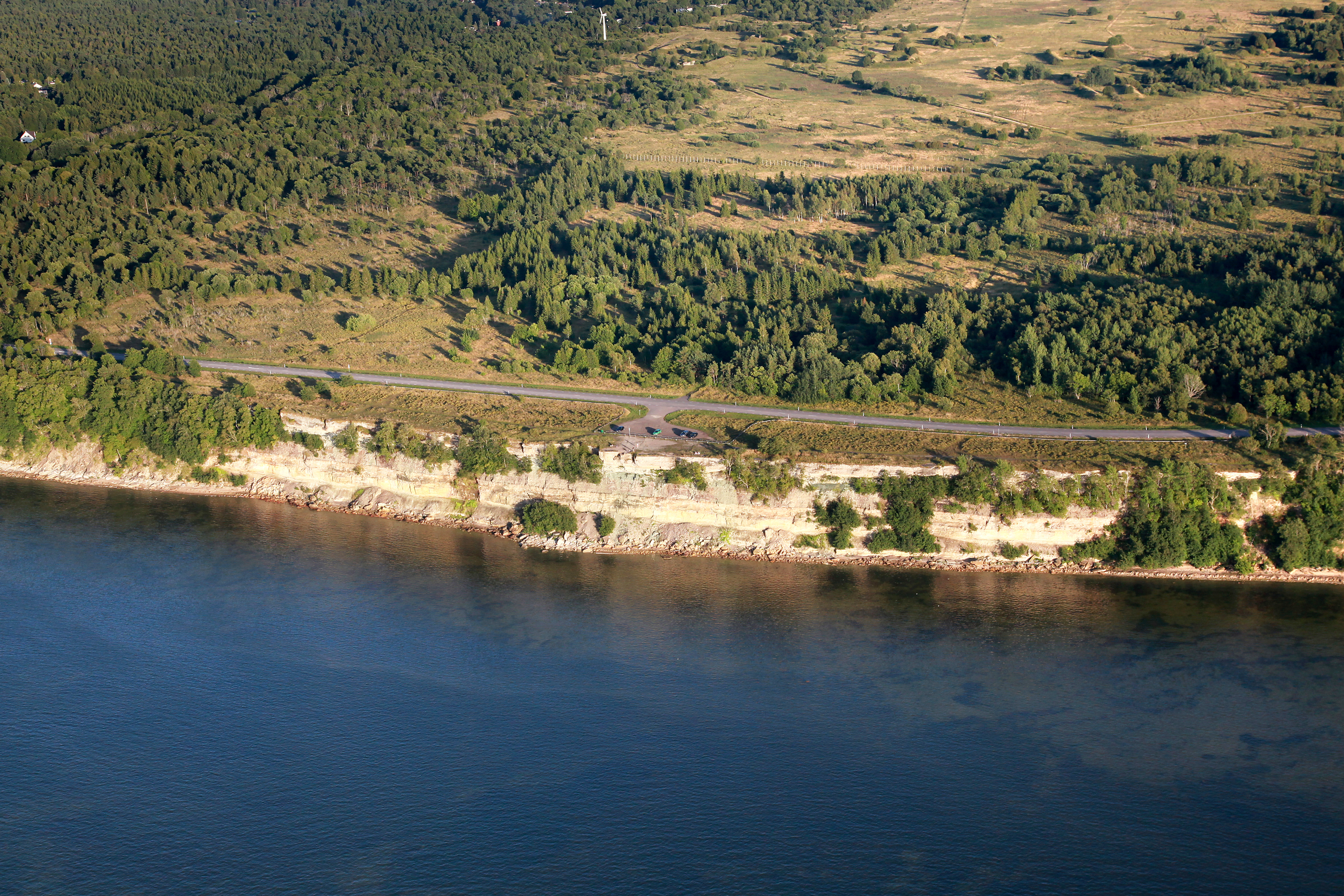
Aerial image of Türisalu Cliff

Türisalu Cliff is a cliff in Türisalu, Estonia. The cliff is part of the Baltic Klint and has a height of up to 30 metres (100 ft).

Türisalu cliff has accumulated a negative reputation as a suicide hotspot, especially among younger people. In the summer of 2008, a barrier was installed along the entire length of the Türisalu Bank, preventing cars from driving up to the edge of the bank, in an attempt to prevent future suicides and accidents.
