= List of airports in Finland =

Map of Finland

Below is a list of airports, airfields and heliports in Finland, grouped by type and sorted by location.

== Airports ==
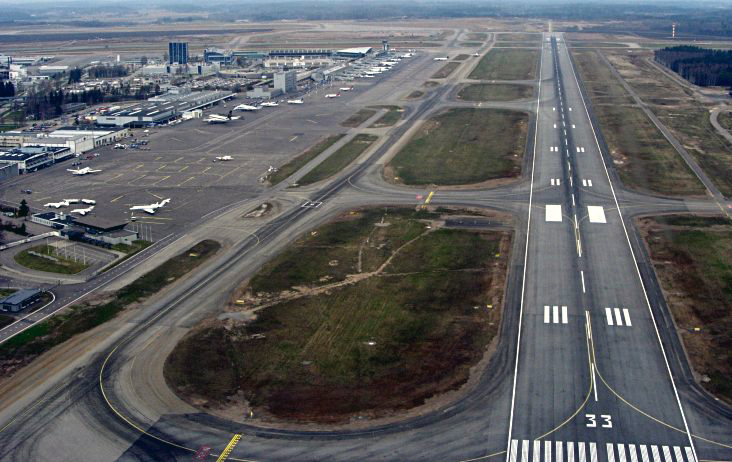
Helsinki-Vantaa Airport

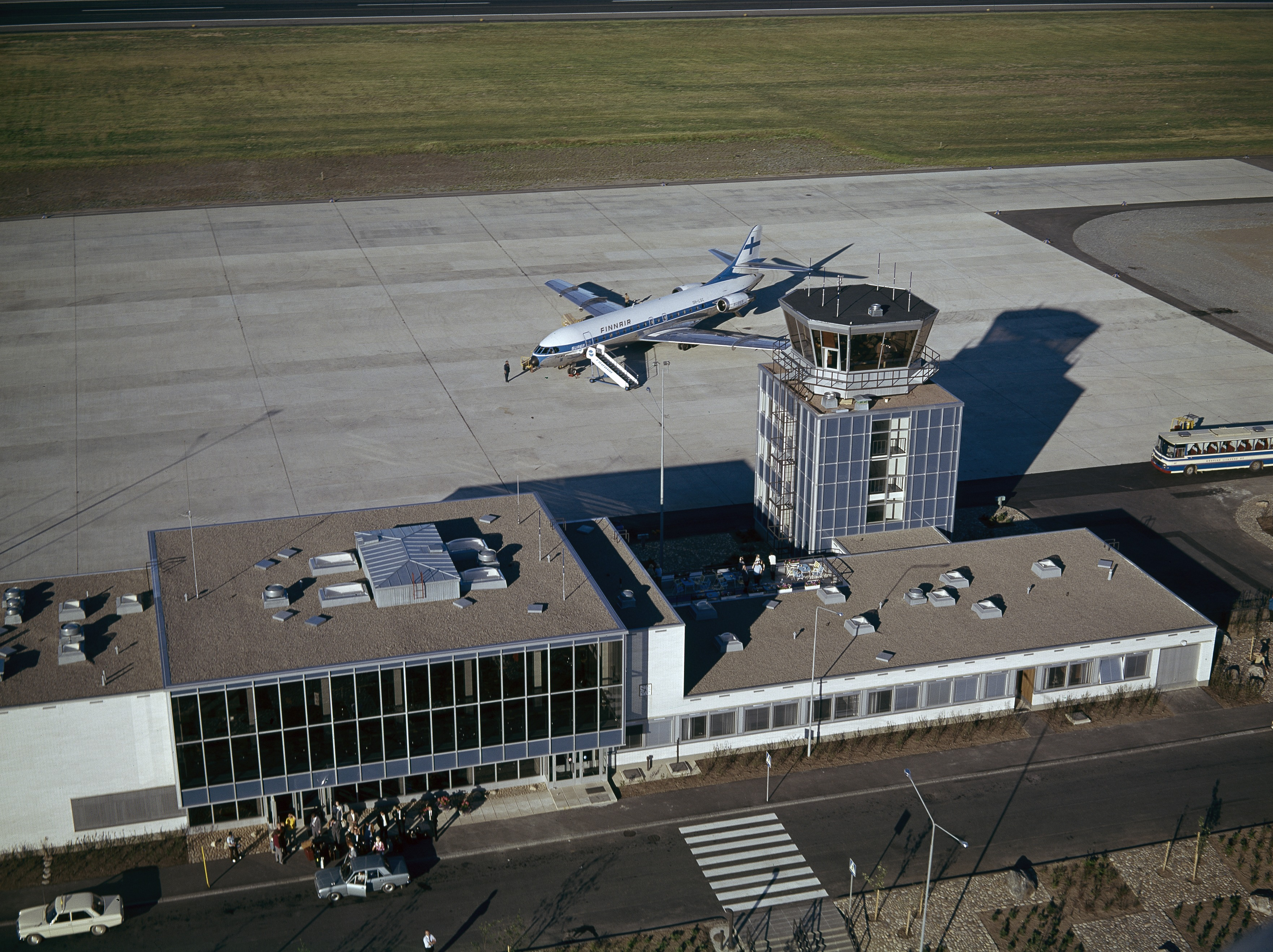
Kuopio Airport

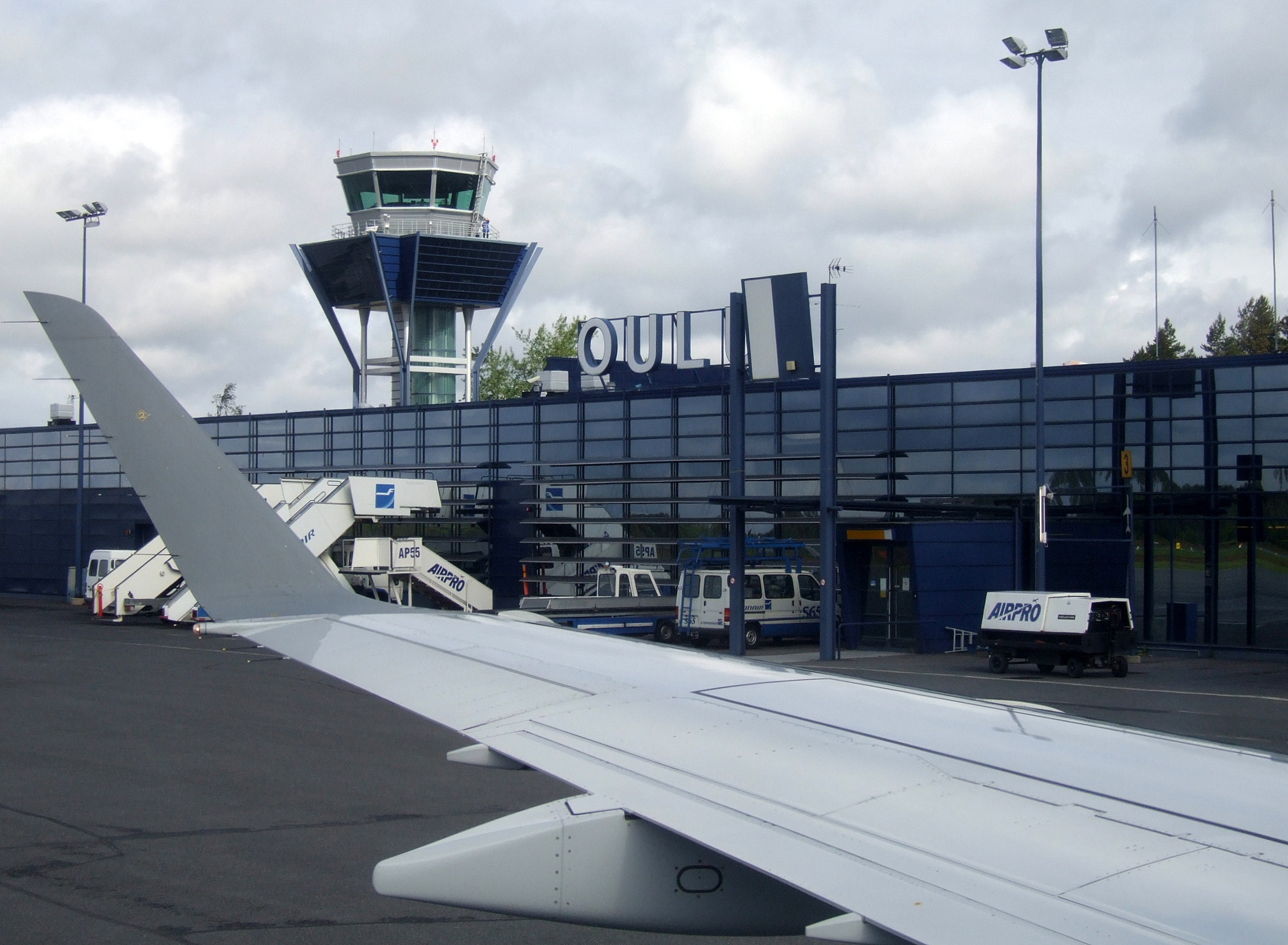
Oulu Airport

ICAO location identifiers link to pages from the Finnish Aeronautical Information Service.

Names shown in bold indicate airports with scheduled passenger service on commercial airlines. For such airports, the number of passengers and a percentage of the total number of passengers on commercial airports in Finland in 2025 is given.

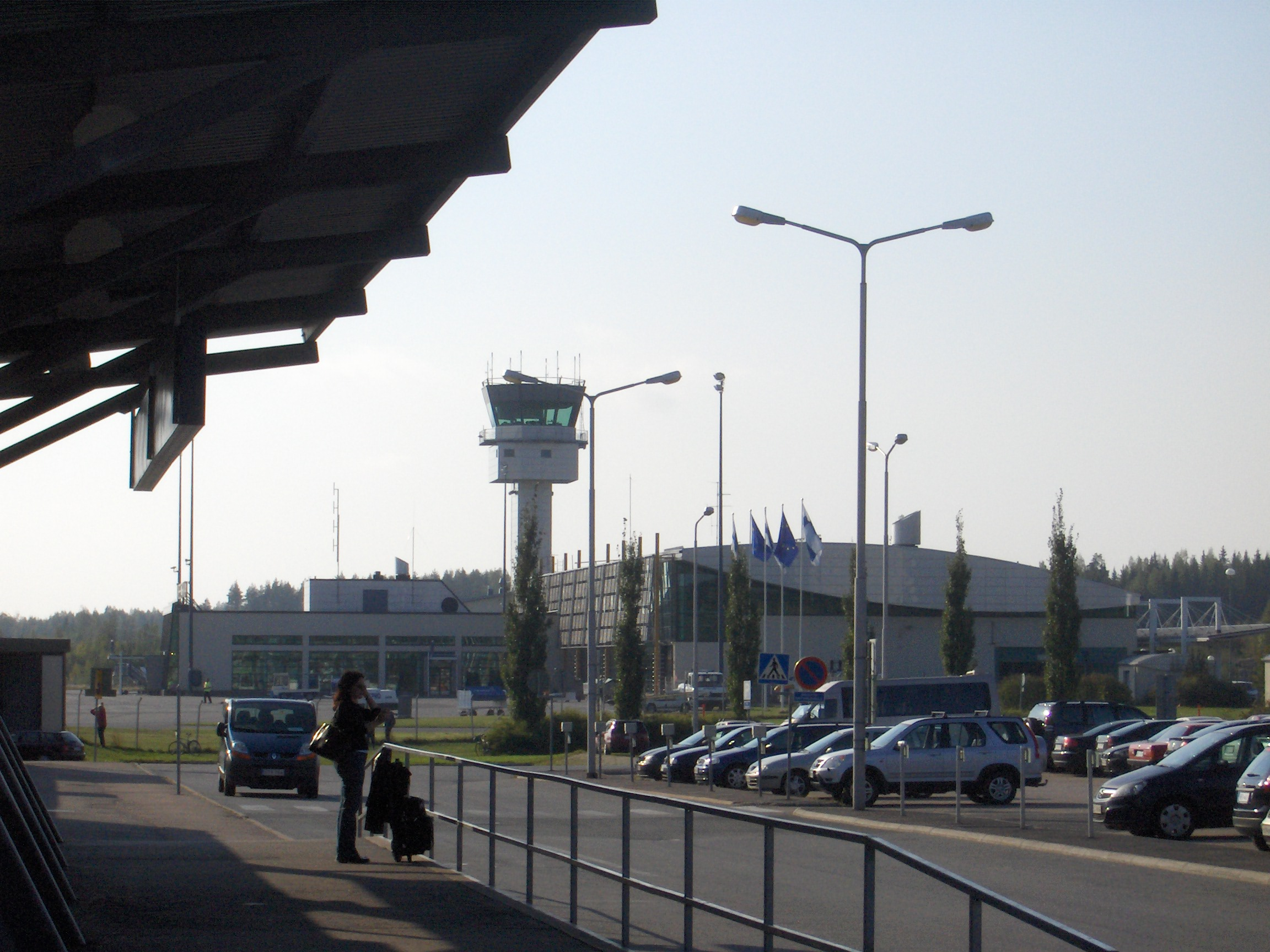
Tampere Airport

City served / location	Region	ICAO	IATA	Airport name	Type	Passengers (2025)
**Airports**
Enontekiö	Lapland	EFET	ENF	Enontekiö Airport	Civil	41,977 (0.20%)
Helsinki / Malmi	Uusimaa	EFHF	HEM	Helsinki-Malmi Airport	Civil	
Helsinki / Vantaa	Uusimaa	EFHK	HEL	**Helsinki-Vantaa Airport**	Civil	16,980,287 (82.80%)
Hyvinkää, Hyvinkää	Uusimaa	EFHV	HYV	Hyvinkää Airfield	Civil	
Ivalo, Inari	Lapland	EFIV	IVL	**Ivalo Airport**	Civil	249,056 (1.21%)
Joensuu / Liperi	North Karelia	EFJO	JOE	**Joensuu Airport**	Civil	41,302 (0.20%)
Jyväskylä / Tikkakoski	Central Finland	EFJY	JYV	**Jyväskylä Airport**	Civil/military	28,321 (0.14%)
Jämsä	Central Finland	EFHA	KEV	Halli Airport	Military	0 (0.00%)
Kajaani	Kainuu	EFKI	KAJ	**Kajaani Airport**	Civil	43,116 (0.21%)
Kauhava	Southern Ostrobothnia	EFKA	KAU	Kauhava Airport	Military	
Kemi / Tornio	Lapland	EFKE	KEM	**Kemi-Tornio Airport**	Civil	34,624 (0.17%)
Kittilä	Lapland	EFKT	KTT	**Kittilä Airport**	Civil	445,911 (2.17%)
Kokkola / Kronoby	Ostrobothnia	EFKK	KOK	**Kokkola-Pietarsaari Airport**	Civil	32,131 (0.16%)
Kouvola	Kymenlaakso	EFUT	UTI	Utti Airport	Military	0 (0.00%)
Kuopio / Siilinjärvi	Pohjois-Savo	EFKU	KUO	**Kuopio Airport**	Civil/military	144,119 (0.70%)
Kuusamo	Northern Ostrobothnia	EFKS	KAO	**Kuusamo Airport**	Civil	129,373 (0.63%)
Lappeenranta	South Karelia	EFLP	LPP	Lappeenranta Airport	Civil	21,367 (0.10%)
Mariehamn / Jomala	Åland	EFMA	MHQ	**Mariehamn Airport**	Civil	42,308 (0.21%)
Mikkeli	Etelä-Savo	EFMI	MIK	Mikkeli Airport	Civil	
Oulu	Northern Ostrobothnia	EFOU	OUL	**Oulu Airport**	Civil	545,034 (2.66%)
Pori	Satakunta	EFPO	POR	**Pori Airport**	Civil	12,856 (0.06%)
Rovaniemi	Lapland	EFRO	RVN	**Rovaniemi Airport**	Civil/military	1,120,022 (5.46%)
Savonlinna	Etelä-Savo	EFSA	SVL	**Savonlinna Airport**	Civil	6,792 (0.03%)
Seinäjoki / Ilmajoki	Southern Ostrobothnia	EFSI	SJY	Seinäjoki Airport	Civil	0 (0.00%)
Tampere / Pirkkala	Pirkanmaa	EFTP	TMP	**Tampere-Pirkkala Airport**	Civil/military	140,664 (0.69%)
Turku	Southwest Finland	EFTU	TKU	**Turku Airport**	Civil	278,503 (1.36%)
Vaasa	Ostrobothnia	EFVA	VAA	**Vaasa Airport**	Civil	169,431 (0.83%)
Varkaus / Joroinen	Etelä-Savo	EFVR	VRK	Varkaus Airport	Civil	0 (0.00%)
**Airfields**
Alajärvi	Southern Ostrobothnia	EFME		Menkijärvi Airfield		
Alavus	Southern Ostrobothnia	EFAL		Alavus Airfield		
Asikkala	Päijät-Häme	EFLA		Lahti-Vesivehmaa Airfield		
Eura	Satakunta	EFEU		Eura Airfield		
Forssa	Kanta-Häme	EFFO		Forssa Airfield		
Haapajärvi	Northern Ostrobothnia	EFHJ		Haapajärvi Airfield		
Haapavesi	Northern Ostrobothnia	EFHP		Haapavesi Airfield		
Hailuoto	Northern Ostrobothnia	EFHL		Hailuoto Airfield		
Hanko	Uusimaa	EFHN		Hanko Airfield		
Helsinki (Meilahti Hospital)	Uusimaa	EFHY		Meilahti hospital		
Huittinen (Vampula)	Satakunta	EFVP		Vampula Airfield		
Hämeenkyrö	Pirkanmaa	EFHM		Hämeenkyrö Airfield		
Iisalmi	Pohjois-Savo	EFII		Iisalmi Airfield		
Imatra	South Karelia	EFIM		Immola Airfield		
Ingå	Uusimaa	EFTO		Torbacka Airfield		
Jämijärvi	Satakunta	EFJM		Jämijärvi Airfield		
Kalajoki	Northern Ostrobothnia	EFKO		Kalajoki Airfield		
Kannus	Central Ostrobothnia	EFKN		Kannus Airfield		
Kauhajoki	Southern Ostrobothnia	EFKJ	KHJ	Kauhajoki Airfield		
Kemijärvi	Lapland	EFKM		Kemijärvi Airfield		
Kimitoön (Dragsfjärd)	Southwest Finland	EFGE		Genböle Airfield		
Kitee	North Karelia	EFIT	KTQ	Kitee Airfield		
Kittilä	Lapland	EFPA		Pokka Airfield		
Kiuruvesi	Pohjois-Savo	EFRV		Kiuruvesi Airfield		
Kivijärvi	Central Finland	EFKV		Kivijärvi Airfield		
Kokemäki	Satakunta	EFPI		Piikajärvi Airfield		
Kolari	Lapland	EFAA		Aavahelukka Airfield		
Kotka	Kymenlaakso	EFKY		Kymi Airfield		
Kouvola	Kymenlaakso	EFSE		Selänpää Airfield		
Kouvola (Anjalankoski)	Kymenlaakso	EFWB		Wredeby Airfield		
Kuhmo	Kainuu	EFKH		Kuhmo Airfield		
Kumlinge	Åland	EFKG		Kumlinge Airfield		
Kärsämäki	Northern Ostrobothnia	EFKR		Kärsämäki Airfield		
Lapinlahti	Pohjois-Savo	EFLL		Lapinlahti Airfield		
Lieksa	North Karelia	EFLN		Lieksa-Nurmes Airfield		
Loppi	Kanta-Häme	EFRY		Räyskälä Airfield		
Mäntsälä	Uusimaa	EFMN		Mäntsälä Airfield		
Nurmijärvi	Uusimaa	EFNS		Savikko Airfield		
Oripää	Southwest Finland	EFOP		Oripää Airfield		
Oulu	Northern Ostrobothnia	EFAH		Ahmosuo Airfield		
Pieksämäki	Etelä-Savo	EFPK		Pieksämäki Airfield		
Pudasjärvi	Northern Ostrobothnia	EFPU		Pudasjärvi Airfield		
Punkaharju	Etelä-Savo	EFPN		Punkaharju Airfield		
Pyhtää	Kymenlaakso	EFPR		Pyhtää Redstone Aerodrome		
Pyhäjärvi	Northern Ostrobothnia	EFPY		Pyhäsalmi Airfield		
Raahe	Northern Ostrobothnia	EFRH		Raahe-Pattijoki Airfield		
Rantasalmi	Etelä-Savo	EFRN		Rantasalmi Airfield		
Ranua	Lapland	EFRU		Ranua Airfield		
Rautavaara	Pohjois-Savo	EFRA		Rautavaara Airfield		
Salo	Southwest Finland	EFIK		Kiikala Airfield		
Sodankylä	Lapland	EFSO	SOT	Sodankylä Airfield		
Suomussalmi	Kainuu	EFSU		Suomussalmi Airfield		
Tampere	Pirkanmaa	EFTS		Teisko Airfield		
Vaala	Kainuu	EFVL		Vaala Airfield		
Veteli	Central Ostrobothnia	EFVT		Sulkaharju Airfield		
Vihti / Nummela	Uusimaa	EFNU		Nummela Airfield		
Viitasaari	Central Finland	EFVI		Viitasaari Airfield		
Ylivieska	Northern Ostrobothnia	EFYL	YLI	Ylivieska Airfield		
**Heliports**
Enontekiö	Lapland	EFEK		Kilpisjärvi Heliport & seaplane dock		
Espoo	Uusimaa	EFEJ		Jorvi Hospital Heliport		
Helsinki	Uusimaa	EFHE		Helsinki Hernesaari Heliport		
Helsinki	Uusimaa	EFHY		Helsinki University Hospital/Meilahti Heliport		
Hämeenlinna	Kanta-Häme	EFHH		Kanta-Häme Central Hospital Heliport		
Joensuu	North Karelia	EFJE		Northern Karelia Central Hospital Heliport		
Jyväskylä	Central Finland	EFJV		Central Finland Central Hospital Heliport		
Kuopio	Pohjois-Savo	EFPJ		Kuopio University Hospital Heliport		
Lahti	Päijät-Häme	EFPL		Päijät-Häme Central Hospital Heliport		
Oulu	Northern Ostrobothnia	EFHO		Oulu University Hospital Heliport		
Rovaniemi	Lapland	EFLR		Lapland Central Hospital Heliport		
Seinäjoki	Southern Ostrobothnia	EFHS		Seinäjoki Central Hospital Heliport		
Tampere	Pirkanmaa	EFPT		Tampere University Hospital Heliport		
Turku	Southwest Finland	EFTV		Turku University Hospital Heliport		
Vantaa	Uusimaa	EFPE		Peijas Hospital Heliport		

Locations of the airports

== See also ==
- Finnish Air Force
- List of airports by ICAO code: EB-EG#EF - Finland
- List of the largest airports in the Nordic countries
- Transport in Finland
- Wikipedia:WikiProject Aviation/Airline destination lists: Europe#Finland
