= List of airports in Åland =

List of airports in Åland, sorted by location.

== List ==
Airport name	IATA	ICAO	Municipality	Type
Kumlinge Airfield		EFKG	Kumlinge	Civil
Mariehamn Airport	MHQ	EFMA	Mariehamn	Civil

== See also ==
- List of airports in Finland
- Transport in Åland
- Wikipedia: Airline destination lists: Europe#Åland
- List of the largest airports in the Nordic countries
