= KTQ =

KTQ or ktq can refer to:

- Cooperation for Transparency and Quality in Hospitals (German: Kooperation für Transparenz und Qualität im Gesundheitswesen), a German healthcare accreditation organisation; see List of international healthcare accreditation organizations § Germany
- Katabangan language (iso-639-3: ktq), an extinct language of the Philippines
- Kitee Airfield, Finland (IATA code: KTQ)
- Kudra railway station, Bihar, India (station code: KTQ); see Kudra § Rail
- The Library of Congress Classification for works related to law in Sudan; see Library of Congress Classification:Class K -- Law § KTQ - Sudan
