= QMN =

QMN may refer to:

- QMN, the quasi-monoenergetic neutron beam facility at The Svedberg Laboratory
- QMN, the IATA code for Nummela Airfield
