= Vampula Airfield =

Vampula Airfield Vampulan lentokenttä
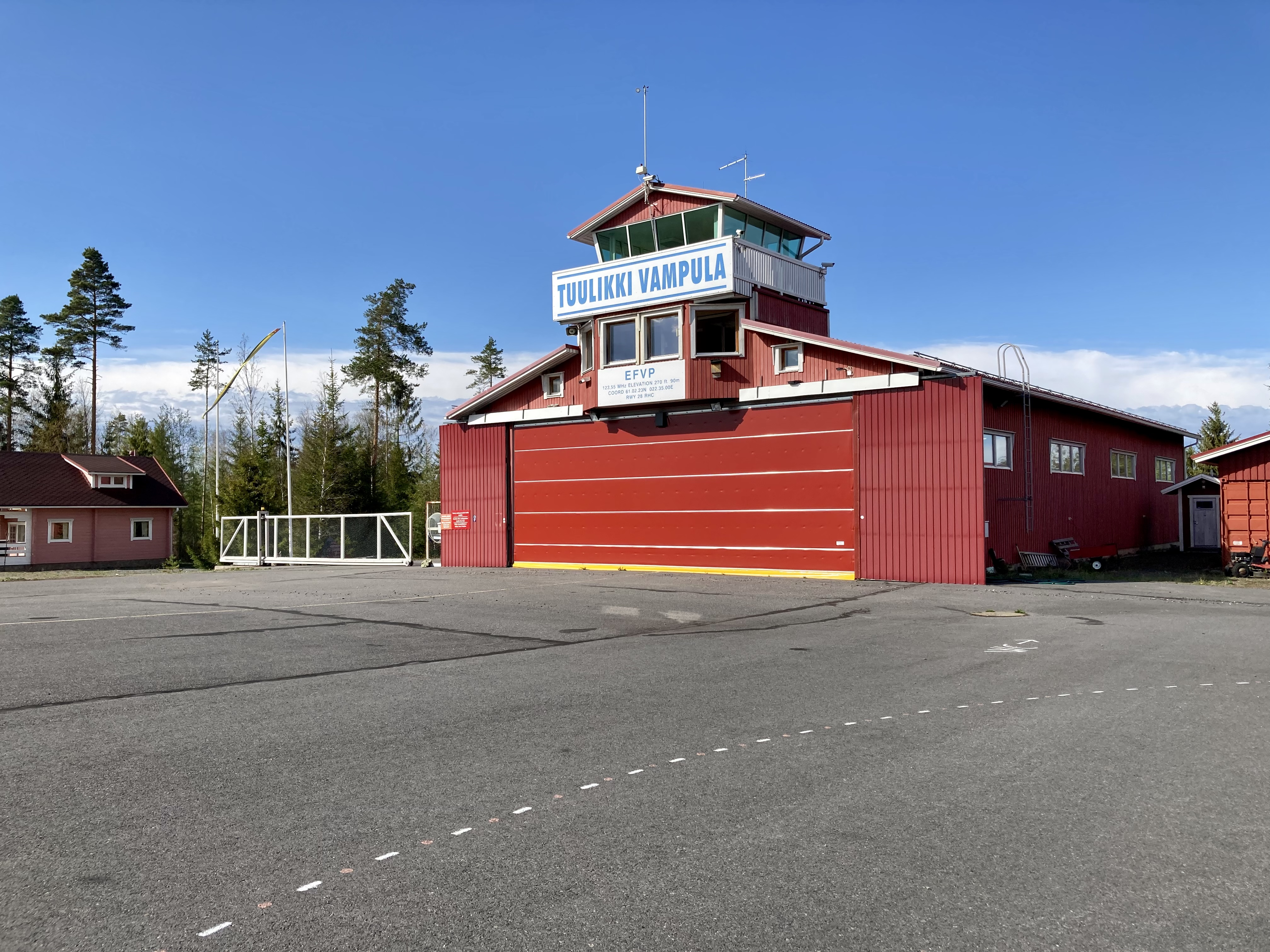
- IATA: none; ICAO: EFVP

Summary
- Airport type: Public
- Operator: Leevi K. Laitinen
- Location: Vampula, Huittinen, Finland
- Elevation AMSL: 295 ft / 90 m
- Coordinates: 61°02′23″N 022°35′30″E

Map
- Location within Finland

Runways
Direction	Length		Surface
Direction	m	ft	Surface
10/28	900	2,953	Asphalt/gravel
- Source: VFR Finland

Vampula Airfield is an airfield in Vampula, Huittinen, Finland, about 3 nautical miles (5.6 km; 3.5 mi) west-northwest of Vampula village.

== See also ==
- List of airports in Finland
