= EFRA =

EFRA or Efra may refer to:

- Efra, Syria, a village in the Qudsaya District
- Environment, Food and Rural Affairs Select Committee of the UK parliament
- European Federation of Radio Operated Model Automobiles, a governing body for racing of radio-controlled cars
- Rautavaara Airfield, Finland (ICAO code: EFRA)

== See also ==
- River Effra in south London
