= Shore Field =

Pesäpallo stadium in Kitee, Finland

- Kiteen Rantakenttä
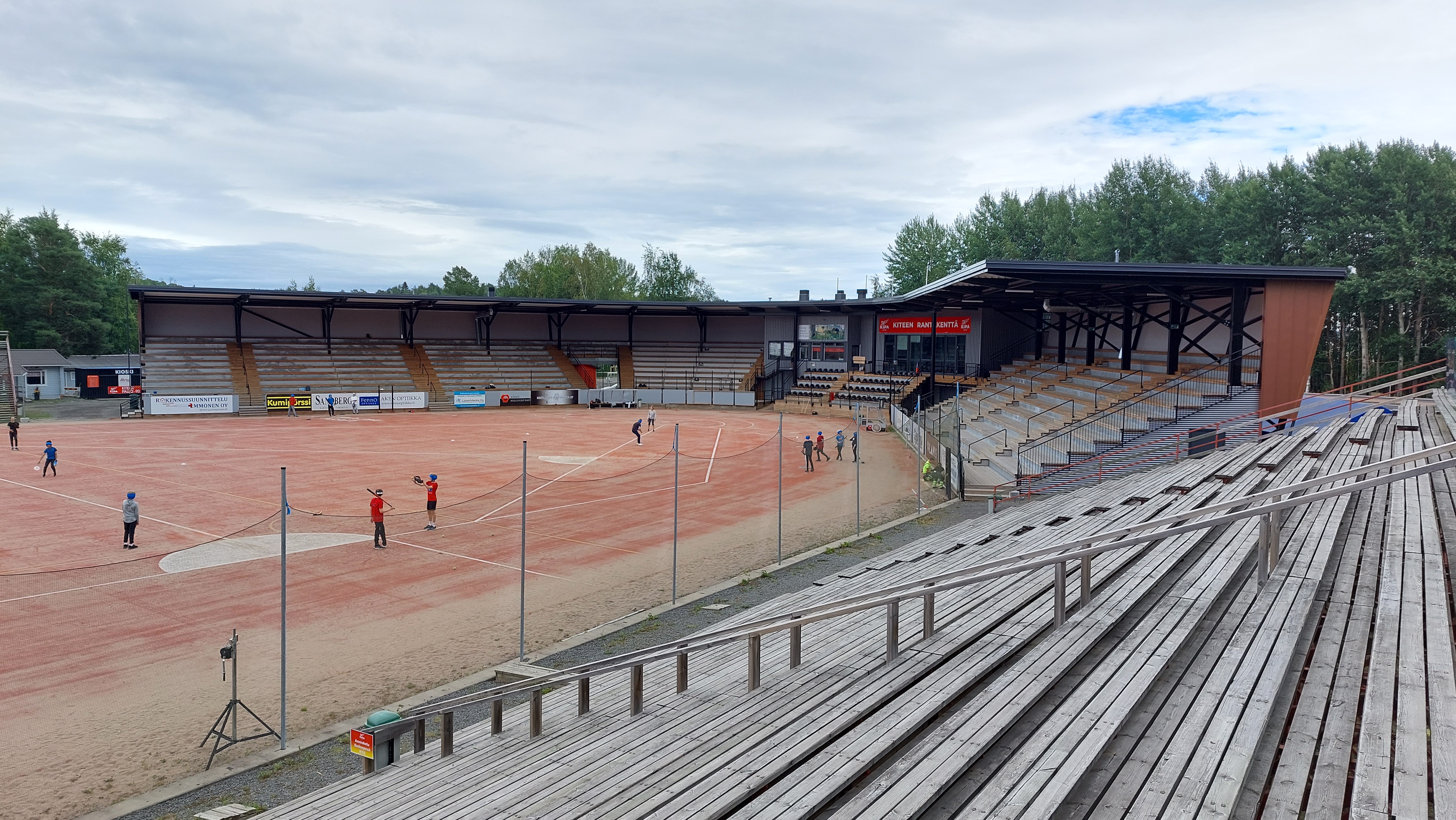
- Shore Field in 2022.

- Location within North Karelia Location within Finland Location within Europe
- Address: Tohmajärventie 10; 82500 Kitee
- Location: Kitee, Finland
- Coordinates: 62.106389°N 30.141190°E
- Owner: City of Kitee
- Capacity: 5,000
- Surface: Clay; Grass (Past centre billboards and deep right)
- Record attendance: 7,773; July 14, 1996 (All-Star Game)
- Field size: Right field: 132 m (433 ft)
- Public transit: Ilmarisentie, Savonlinja line 500

Tenant
- Kiteen Pallo -90 (1990–present)

The Shore Field (Finnish: Rantakenttä) is a pesäpallo stadium located in Kitee, Finland. Since its opening it has been the home field of the Kiteen Pallo -90, a Superpesis team.

The Shore Field is located on the shore of Kiteenjärvi. In addition to the nearby lakeside field, the field is characterised by the alders located very close to the field.

The stadium also hosted a Nightwish concert in June 2023.
