= Kärsämäki Airfield =

Kärsämäki Airfield Kärsämäen lentokenttä
- IATA: none; ICAO: EFKR

Summary
- Airport type: Public
- Operator: Municipality of Kärsämäki
- Location: Kärsämäki, Finland
- Elevation AMSL: 348 ft / 106 m
- Coordinates: 63°59′21″N 025°44′37″E

Map
- Location within Finland

Runways
Direction	Length		Surface
Direction	m	ft	Surface
09/27	700	2,297	Gravel/grass
- Source: VFR Finland

Kärsämäki Airfield is an airfield in Kärsämäki, Finland.

== See also ==
- List of airports in Finland
