= Jämijärvi Airfield =

Jämijärvi Airfield Jämijärven lentokenttä
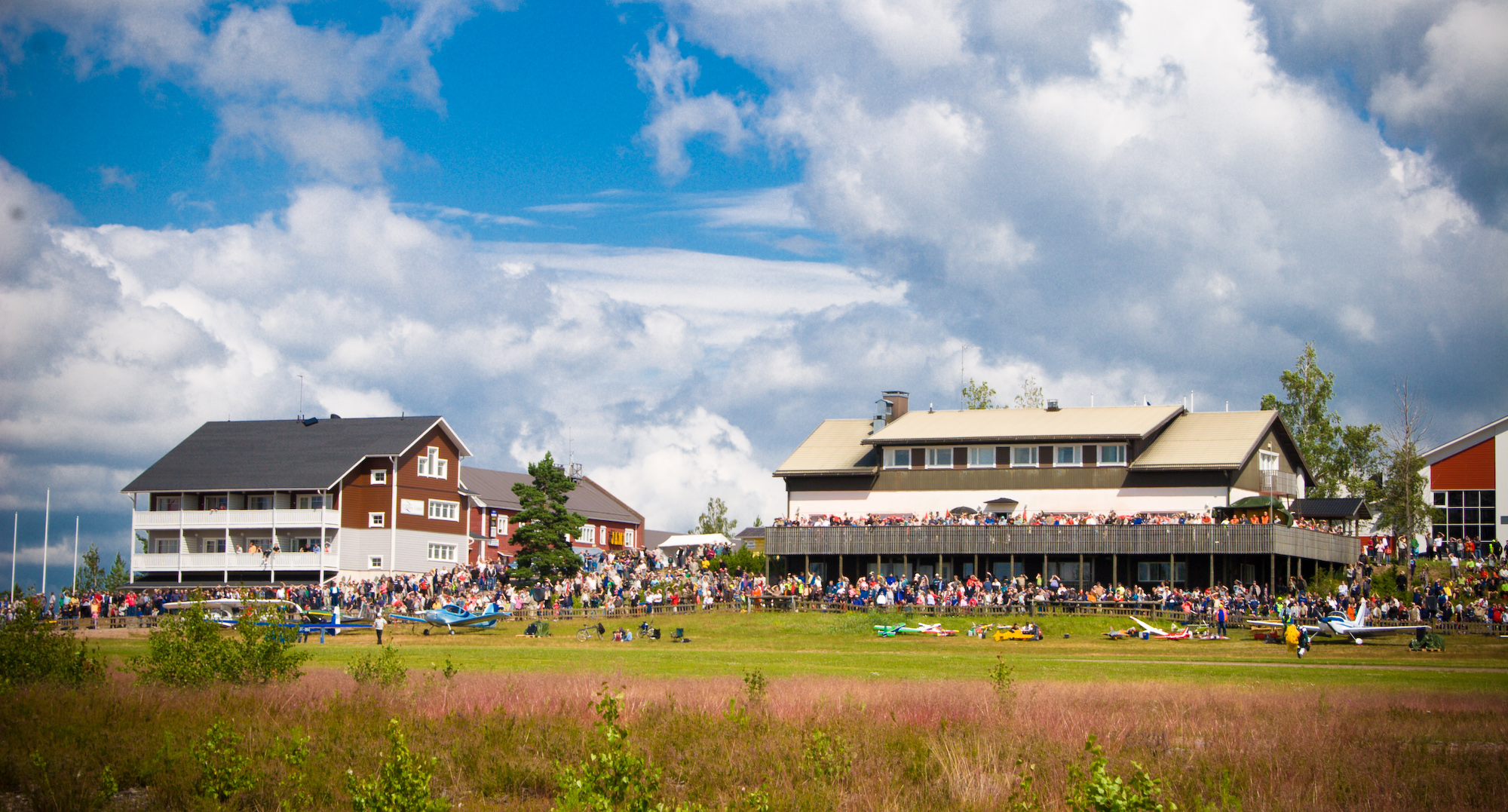
- Jämi Fly-in 2008
- IATA: none; ICAO: EFJM

Summary
- Operator: Jämi-säätiö
- Location: Jämijärvi, Finland
- Elevation AMSL: 505 ft (154 m)
- Coordinates: 61°46′43″N 022°42′58″E

Map
- Location within Finland

Runways
Direction	Length		Surface
Direction	m	ft	Surface
09/27	830	2,723	Asphalt
15/33	830	2,723	Oiled gravel
- Source: VFR Finland

Jämijärvi Airfield (ICAO: EFJM) is an airfield in Jämijärvi, Finland, about 7 kilometres (4 mi) south of Jämijärvi municipal centre. It is one of the busiest general aviation airfields in Finland.

A serious aviation accident happened near the airfield in April 2014.

== History ==
Jämijärvi Airfield was established in 1935.

== See also ==
- List of airports in Finland
