= Aavahelukka Airfield =

Airfield in Kolari and Muonio, Finland

Aavahelukka Airfield Aavahelukan lentokenttä
- IATA: none; ICAO: EFAA

Summary
- Airport type: Public
- Owner: Municipality of Kolari
- Operator: Municipality of Kolari
- Location: Kolari/Muonio, Finland
- Elevation AMSL: 738 ft / 225 m
- Coordinates: 67°36′13″N 023°58′18″E
- Website: www.kolari.fi

Map
- Location within Finland

Runways
Direction	Length		Surface
Direction	m	ft	Surface
14/32	864	2,835	Asphalt
- Source: VFR Finland

Aavahelukka Airfield (ICAO: EFAA) is an aerodrome located in Kolari, and partly in Muonio, Finland, about 40 kilometres (25 mi) north of Kolari municipal centre and 10 kilometres (6 mi) west of Äkäslompolo village.

== Facilities ==
The airfield resides at an elevation of 738 feet (225 m) above mean sea level. It has one runway designated 14/32 with an asphalt surface measuring 864 by 30 metres (2,835 ft × 98 ft).

== See also ==
- List of airports in Finland
