= Lapinlahti Airfield =

Lapinlahti Airfield Lapinlahden lentokenttä
- IATA: none; ICAO: EFLL

Summary
- Airport type: Public
- Operator: Lapinlahden Ilmailijat ry
- Location: Lapinlahti, Finland
- Elevation AMSL: 328 ft / 100 m
- Coordinates: 63°23′58″N 027°28′44″E

Map
- Location within Finland

Runways
Direction	Length		Surface
Direction	m	ft	Surface
04/22	340	1,115	Grass
- Source: VFR Finland

Lapinlahti Airfield is an airfield in Lapinlahti, Finland, about 3 nautical miles (5.6 km; 3.5 mi) northeast of Lapinlahti municipal centre.

== See also ==
- List of airports in Finland
