= Pieksämäki Airfield =

Pieksämäki Airfield Pieksämäen lentokenttä
- IATA: none; ICAO: EFPK

Summary
- Airport type: Public
- Operator: Naarajärvi-Säätiö
- Location: Pieksämäki, Finland
- Elevation AMSL: 390 ft / 119 m
- Coordinates: 62°15′53″N 027°00′10″E

Map
- Location within Finland

Runways
Direction	Length		Surface
Direction	m	ft	Surface
15/33	740	2,428	Asphalt/gravel
- Source: VFR Finland

Pieksämäki Airfield is an airfield in Pieksämäki, Finland, about 5 nautical miles (9 km; 6 mi) west-southwest of Pieksämäki town centre.

== See also ==
- List of airports in Finland
