= Kemijärvi Airfield =

Kemijärvi Airfield Kemijärven lentokenttä
- IATA: none; ICAO: EFKM

Summary
- Airport type: Public
- Operator: Municipality of Kemijärvi
- Location: Kemijärvi, Finland
- Elevation AMSL: 692 ft / 211 m
- Coordinates: 66°42′57″N 027°09′26″E

Map
- Location within Finland

Runways
Direction	Length		Surface
Direction	m	ft	Surface
17/35	1,400	4,593	Asphalt
- Source: VFR Finland

Kemijärvi Airfield is an airfield in Kemijärvi, Finland, about 7 nautical miles (13 km; 8 mi) west of Kemijärvi town centre.

== Controversy ==
The Finnish Defense Forces blocked a 2018 attempt to purchase or lease the Kemijärvi Airfield by China's Polar Research Institute, which had proposed the idea to the city of Kemijärvi through a delegation that included Major Lie Ji, an assistant to the military attaché of the Chinese Embassy in Finland. The airfield's proximity to Rovajärvi, Europe's largest artillery range, and a European Union directive restricting foreign investment were given by a consultant at Finland's Ministry of Defense as reasons for the objection.

== See also ==
- List of airports in Finland
