= Kannus Airfield =

Former airfield in Kannus, Finland

Kannus Airfield Kannuksen lentokenttä
- IATA: none; ICAO: EFKN

Summary
- Airport type: Public
- Operator: Kannuksen Lentokerho ry
- Location: Kannus, Finland
- Elevation AMSL: 338 ft (103 m)
- Coordinates: 63°55′14″N 024°05′12″E

Map
- Location within Finland

Runways
Direction	Length		Surface
Direction	m	ft	Surface
11/29	700	2,297	Asphalt/gravel
- Source: VFR Finland

Kannus Airfield is a former airfield in Kannus, Finland, about 5 nautical miles (9 km; 6 mi) east of Kannus town centre. The airfield was closed on 6 April 2021.

== See also ==
- List of airports in Finland
