= Suomussalmi Airfield =

Suomussalmi Airfield Suomussalmen lentokenttä
- IATA: none; ICAO: EFSU

Summary
- Airport type: Public
- Operator: Municipality of Suomussalmi
- Location: Suomussalmi, Finland
- Elevation AMSL: 541 ft / 165 m
- Coordinates: 64°49′19″N 028°42′37″E

Map
- Location within Finland

Runways
Direction	Length		Surface
Direction	m	ft	Surface
05/23	800	2,625	Oiled gravel/sand
- Source: VFR Finland

Suomussalmi Airfield is an airfield in Suomussalmi, Finland, about 9 nautical miles (17 km; 10 mi) southwest of Suomussalmi centre.

== See also ==
- List of airports in Finland
