= Punkaharju Airfield =

Punkaharju Airfield Punkaharjun lentokenttä
- IATA: none; ICAO: EFPN

Summary
- Operator: Punkaharjun Lentokenttäyhdistys
- Location: Punkaharju, Savonlinna, Finland
- Elevation AMSL: 253 ft / 77 m
- Coordinates: 61°43′44″N 029°23′37″E

Map
- Location within Finland

Runways
Direction	Length		Surface
Direction	m	ft	Surface
16/34	500	1,640	asphalt/gravel
- Source: VFR Finland

Punkaharju Airfield is an airfield in Punkaharju, Savonlinna, Finland, about 3 kilometres (2 mi) south of Punkaharju municipal centre.

== See also ==
- List of airports in Finland
