= Viitasaari Airfield =

Viitasaari Airfield Viitasaaren lentokenttä
- IATA: none; ICAO: EFVI

Summary
- Airport type: Private
- Operator: Viitasaaren Lentokerho
- Location: Viitasaari, Finland
- Elevation AMSL: 361 ft / 110 m
- Coordinates: 63°07′21″N 025°48′58″E

Map
- Location within Finland

Runways
| Direction | Length | | Surface |
| Direction | m | ft | Surface |
|---|---|---|---|
| 16/34 | 290 | 951 | Grass |
- Source: VFR Finland

Viitasaari Airfield is an airfield in Viitasaari, Finland, about 2 nautical miles (3.7 km; 2.3 mi) north-northwest of Viitasaari town centre. As of September 2011, the airfield is indefinitely closed.

== See also ==
- List of airports in Finland
