= Raahe-Pattijoki Airfield =

Raahe-Pattijoki Airfield Raahe-Pattijoen lentokenttä
- IATA: none; ICAO: EFRH

Summary
- Operator: Raahen Ilmailukerho ry
- Location: Raahe, Finland
- Elevation AMSL: 118 ft / 36 m
- Coordinates: 64°41′17″N 024°41′45″E

Map
- Location within Finland

Runways
Direction	Length		Surface
Direction	m	ft	Surface
10/28	1,000	3,281	asphalt/gravel
- Source: VFR Finland

Raahe-Pattijoki Airfield (ICAO: EFRH) is an airfield in Raahe, Finland, about 9 kilometres (6 mi) east of Raahe town centre.

== See also ==
- List of airports in Finland
