= Ranua Airfield =

Ranua Airfield Ranuan lentokenttä
- IATA: none; ICAO: EFRU

Summary
- Operator: Municipality of Ranua
- Location: Ranua, Finland
- Elevation AMSL: 541 ft / 165 m
- Coordinates: 65°58′23″N 026°21′55″E

Map
- Location within Finland

Runways
Direction	Length		Surface
Direction	m	ft	Surface
15/33	1,200	3,937	asphalt
- Source: VFR Finland

Ranua Airfield (ICAO: EFRU) is an airfield in Ranua, Finland, located 9 kilometres (6 mi) northwest of Ranua centre.

== See also ==
- List of airports in Finland
