= Haapavesi Airfield =

Haapavesi Airfield Haapaveden lentokenttä
- IATA: none; ICAO: EFHP

Summary
- Operator: Pyhäjokialueen Ilmailukerho
- Location: Haapavesi, Finland
- Elevation AMSL: 315 ft / 96 m
- Coordinates: 64°06′47″N 025°30′15″E

Map
- Location within Finland

Runways
Direction	Length		Surface
Direction	m	ft	Surface
12/30	770	2,526	oilgravel, gravel
- Source: VFR Finland

Haapavesi Airfield is an airfield in Haapavesi, Finland.

== See also ==
- List of airports in Finland
