= Kiuruvesi Airfield =

Kiuruvesi Airfield Kiuruveden lentokenttä
- IATA: none; ICAO: EFRV

Summary
- Airport type: Public
- Operator: Ilmailukerho Kiurun Siivet ry
- Location: Kiuruvesi, Finland
- Elevation AMSL: 515 ft / 157 m
- Coordinates: 63°42′20″N 026°36′59″E

Map
- Location within Finland

Runways
Direction	Length		Surface
Direction	m	ft	Surface
15/33	840	2,756	Asphalt
- Source: VFR Finland

Kiuruvesi Airfield is an airfield in Kiuruvesi, Finland, 2.7 nautical miles (5.0 km; 3.1 mi) north of Kiuruvesi town centre.

== See also ==
- List of airports in Finland
