= Kitee Zoo =

- Interactive map of Kitee Zoo
- 62°02′45″N 29°53′54″E
- Date opened: 1996
- Location: Kitee, Finland
- No. of animals: 200
- No. of species: 50
- Website: www.kiteezoo.fi/english/index.html

Kitee Zoo, located in Kitee, Finland is the fourth biggest zoo in the country. It was opened in 1996 and has over 50 animal species. There are Finnish animals, such as bears and lynxes, as well as more exotic animals. It has the only yaks in Finland. Some of the animals at the zoo include adder, Arctic fox, badger, bear, black grouse, chickens, chinchillas, chipmunks, common quail, eagle owl, emu, fox, geese, gerbils, goats, grey partridge, guinea pigs, hamsters, lynx, mallard, mink, mute swan, northern goshawk, Norway lemming, ostrich, peafowl, pigs, polecat, pony, rabbits, raccoon dog, reindeer, sheep, slow worm, turkeys, white-tailed deer, wild boar, wolverine, and wood grouse.
