= Kuhmo Airfield =

Kuhmo Airfield Kuhmon lentokenttä
- IATA: none; ICAO: EFKH

Summary
- Airport type: Public
- Operator: Town of Kuhmo
- Location: Kuhmo, Finland
- Elevation AMSL: 571 ft / 174 m
- Coordinates: 64°06′45″N 029°26′19″E

Map
- Location within Finland

Runways
| Direction | Length | | Surface |
| Direction | m | ft | Surface |
|---|---|---|---|
| 12/30 | 850 | 2,789 | Gravel |
- Source: VFR Finland

Kuhmo Airfield is an airfield in Kuhmo, Finland, about 3 nautical miles (6 km; 3 mi) west of Kuhmo town centre.

== See also ==
- List of airports in Finland
