= Ahmosuo Airfield =

Ahmosuo Airfield Ahmosuon lentokenttä
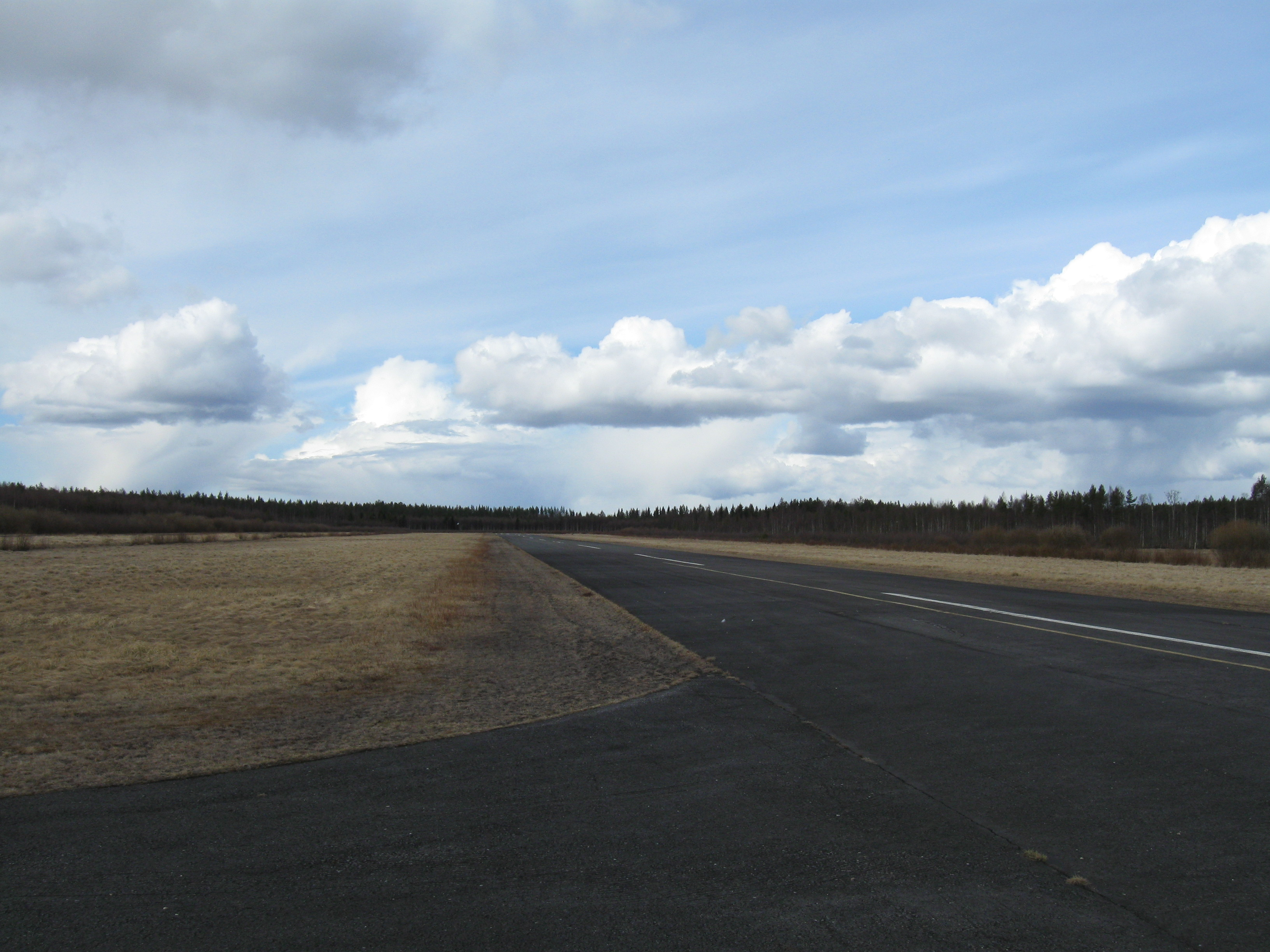
- IATA: none; ICAO: EFAH

Summary
- Operator: City of Oulu
- Location: Hangaskangas, Oulu, Finland
- Elevation AMSL: 95 ft / 29 m
- Coordinates: 64°53′43″N 025°45′08″E

Map
- Location within Finland

Runways
Direction	Length		Surface
Direction	m	ft	Surface
12/30	800	2,625	asphalt/gravel
- Source: VFR Finland

Ahmosuo Airfield (ICAO: EFAH) is an airfield in Hangaskangas, Oulu, Finland, about 20 kilometres (12 mi) southeast from Oulu city centre. The airfield was opened in 1987.

== See also ==
- List of airports in Finland
