= Rantasalmi Airfield =

Rantasalmi Airfield Rantasalmen lentokenttä
- IATA: none; ICAO: EFRN

Summary
- Airport type: Public
- Operator: Rantasalmen Lentokenttäyhdistys ry
- Location: Rantasalmi, Finland
- Elevation AMSL: 292 ft / 89 m
- Coordinates: 62°03′56″N 028°21′24″E

Map
- Location within Finland

Runways
Direction	Length		Surface
Direction	m	ft	Surface
18/36	740	2,428	Asphalt/gravel
- Source: VFR Finland

Rantasalmi Airfield is an airfield in Rantasalmi, Finland, about 2 nautical miles (3.7 km; 2.3 mi) east of Rantasalmi municipal centre.

== See also ==
- List of airports in Finland
