= Hyvinkää Airfield =

Hyvinkää Airfield Hyvinkään lentokenttä Hyvinge flygfält
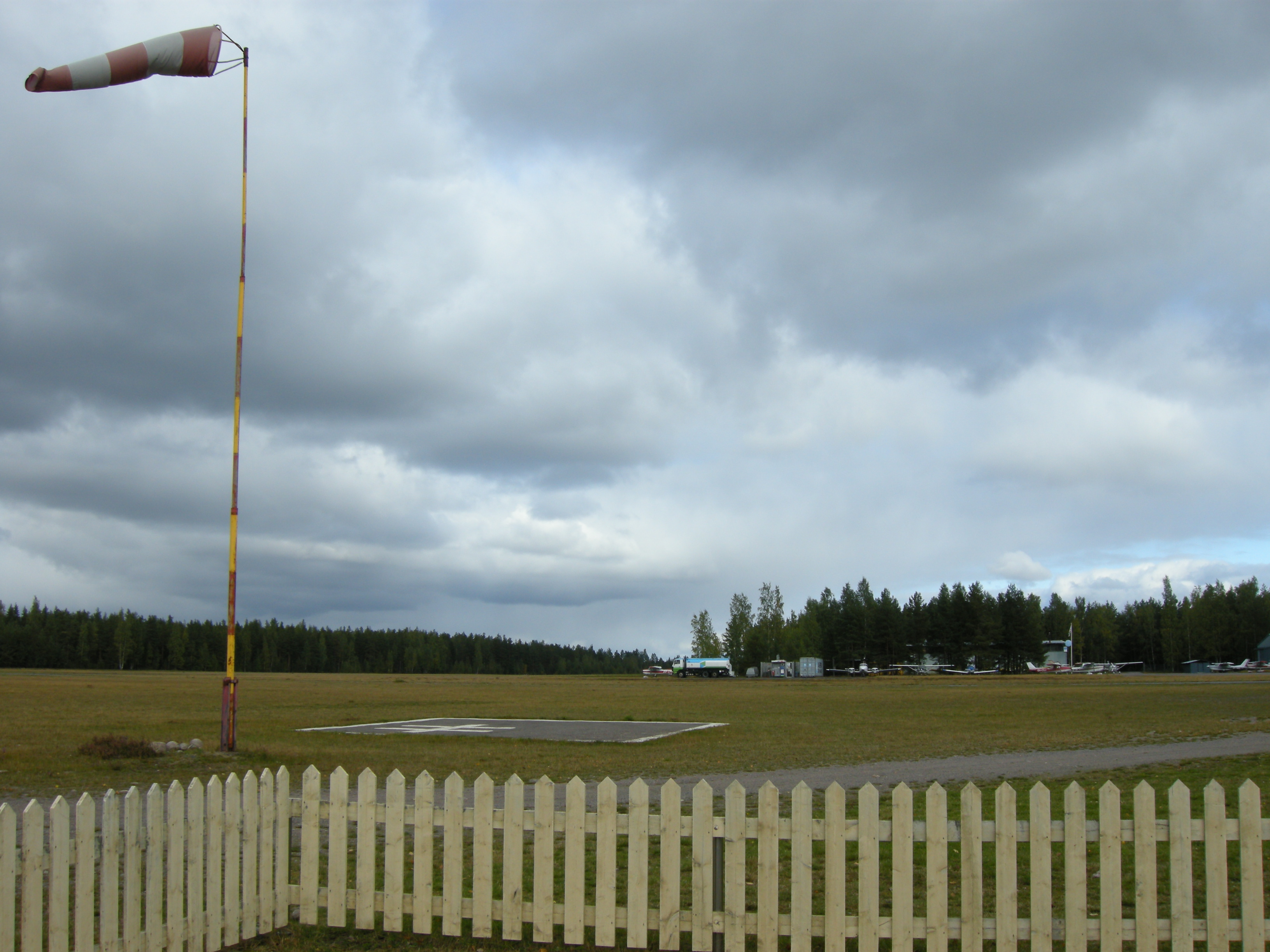
- Hyvinkää Airfield
- IATA: HYV; ICAO: EFHV

Summary
- Operator: Hyvinkään Ilmailukerho
- Location: Hyvinkää, Finland
- Elevation AMSL: 430 ft / 131 m
- Coordinates: 60°39′16″N 024°52′52″E

Map
- Location within Finland

Runways
Direction	Length		Surface
Direction	m	ft	Surface
04/22	1,260	4,134	Asphalt
12/30	790	2,592	Asphalt
- Source: VFR Finland

Hyvinkää Airfield (IATA: HYV, ICAO: EFHV) is an airfield in Hyvinkää, Finland. It has active gliding and powered flying clubs, and is one of the most active General aviation and gliding airfields in Finland.

The airfield served as the main airport in Finland for some time after the Second World War when Helsinki-Malmi Airport was used by the Allied Commission. Aero OY operated several commuter routes by DC-2. DC-3s never flew routes from Hyvinkää as Aero moved back to Malmi before the pilots were fully trained, but DC-3 training flights were conducted from the airfield.

== See also ==
- List of airports in Finland
