= Hämeenkyrö Airfield =

Hämeenkyrö Airfield Hämeenkyrön lentokenttä
- IATA: none; ICAO: EFHM

Summary
- Operator: Hämeenkyrön Lentokerho ry
- Location: Hämeenkyrö, Finland
- Elevation AMSL: 449 ft / 137 m
- Coordinates: 61°41′25″N 023°04′27″E

Map
- Location within Finland

Runways
| Direction | Length | | Surface |
| Direction | m | ft | Surface |
|---|---|---|---|
| 07/25 | 950 | 3,117 | Asphalt |
- Source: VFR Finland

Hämeenkyrö Airfield (ICAO: EFHM) is an airfield in Hämeenkyrö, Finland, about 7 nautical miles (13 km; 8 mi) northwest of Hämeenkyrö centre.

== See also ==
- List of airports in Finland
