= Wredeby Airfield =

Wredeby Airfield Wredebyn lentokenttä
- IATA: none; ICAO: EFWB

Summary
- Airport type: Private
- Operator: F. G. Wrede
- Location: Anjalankoski, Kouvola, Finland
- Elevation AMSL: 82 ft / 25 m
- Coordinates: 60°39′49″N 026°44′45″E

Map
- Location within Finland

Runways
Direction	Length		Surface
Direction	m	ft	Surface
07/25	690	2,264	Grass
- Source: VFR Finland

Wredeby Airfield (ICAO: EFWB) is an aerodrome located in Kouvola, Finland, about 7 kilometres (4 mi) southwest of Anjalankoski.

== Facilities ==
The airfield resides at an elevation of 82 feet (25 m) above mean sea level. It has one runway designated 07/25 with a grass surface measuring 690 by 15 metres (2,264 ft × 49 ft).

== See also ==
- List of airports in Finland
