= Alavus Airfield =

Alavus Airfield Alavuden lentokenttä
- IATA: none; ICAO: EFAL

Summary
- Airport type: Public
- Operator: Alavuden Seudun Lentokenttäsäätiö
- Location: Alavus, Finland
- Elevation AMSL: 407 ft / 124 m
- Coordinates: 62°33′17″N 023°34′24″E

Map
- Location within Finland

Runways
Direction	Length		Surface
Direction	m	ft	Surface
08/26	750	2,461	Oiled gravel/sand
- Source: VFR Finland

Alavus Airfield is an airfield in Alavus, Finland, about 2 nautical miles (4 km; 2 mi) southwest of Alavus town centre.

== See also ==
- List of airports in Finland
