= Iisalmi Airfield =

Iisalmi Airfield Iisalmen lentokenttä
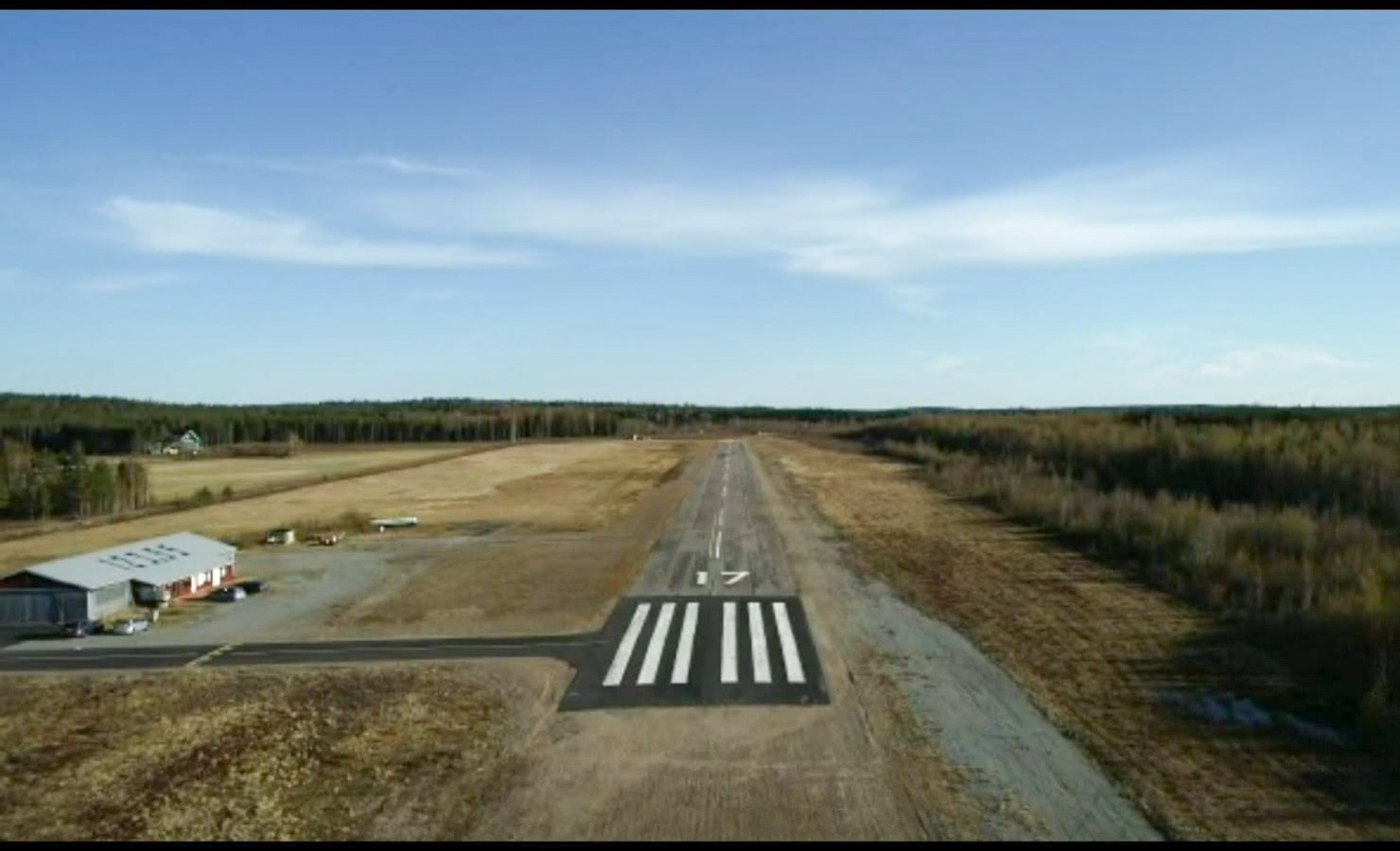
- Iisalmi Airfield from north
- IATA: none; ICAO: EFII

Summary
- Operator: Iisalmen Kaupunki
- Location: Iisalmi, Finland
- Elevation AMSL: 384 ft / 117 m
- Coordinates: 63°37′55″N 027°07′20″E

Map
- Location within Finland

Runways
Direction	Length		Surface
Direction	m	ft	Surface
17/35	660	2,165	Asphalt
- Source: VFR Finland

Iisalmi Airfield is an airfield in Iisalmi, Finland, about 6 nautical miles (11 km; 7 mi) north-northwest of Iisalmi town centre, in Partala village.

== See also ==
- List of airports in Finland
