= Kalajoki Airfield =

Kalajoki Airfield Kalajoen lentokenttä
- IATA: none; ICAO: EFKO

Summary
- Airport type: Public
- Operator: City of Kalajoki
- Location: Kalajoki, Finland
- Elevation AMSL: 43 ft / 13 m
- Coordinates: 64°13′43″N 023°49′35″E

Map
- Location within Finland

Runways
Direction	Length		Surface
Direction	m	ft	Surface
05/23	1,200	3,937	Asphalt/gravel
- Source: VFR Finland

Kalajoki Airfield (ICAO: EFKO) is an airfield in Kalajoki, Finland, about 3 nautical miles (6 km; 3 mi) west-southwest of Kalajoki town centre.

== See also ==
- List of airports in Finland
