= Forssa Airfield =

Forssa Airfield Forssan lentokenttä
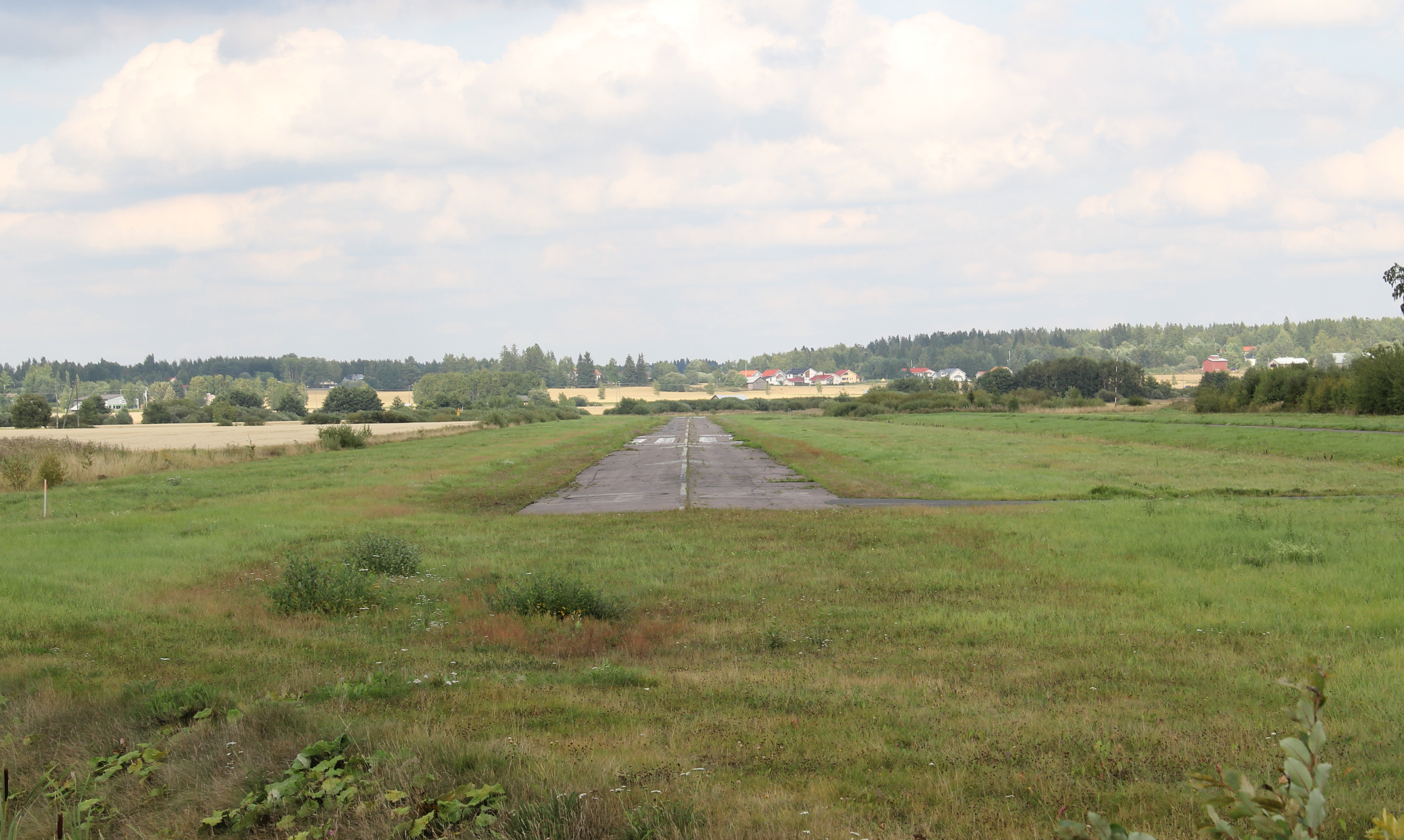
- IATA: none; ICAO: EFFO

Summary
- Operator: Forssan Seudun Ilmailuyhdistys
- Location: Forssa, Finland
- Elevation AMSL: 325 ft / 99 m
- Coordinates: 60°48′07″N 023°38′44″E

Map
- Location within Finland

Runways
Direction	Length		Surface
Direction	m	ft	Surface
04/22	820	2,690	asphalt/grass
- Source: VFR Suomi/Finland

Forssa Airfield (ICAO: EFFO) is an airfield in Forssa, Finland, about 2 kilometres (1.2 mi) southeast of Forssa town centre.

== See also ==
- List of airports in Finland
