= Kivijärvi Airfield =

Kivijärvi Airfield Kivijärven lentokenttä
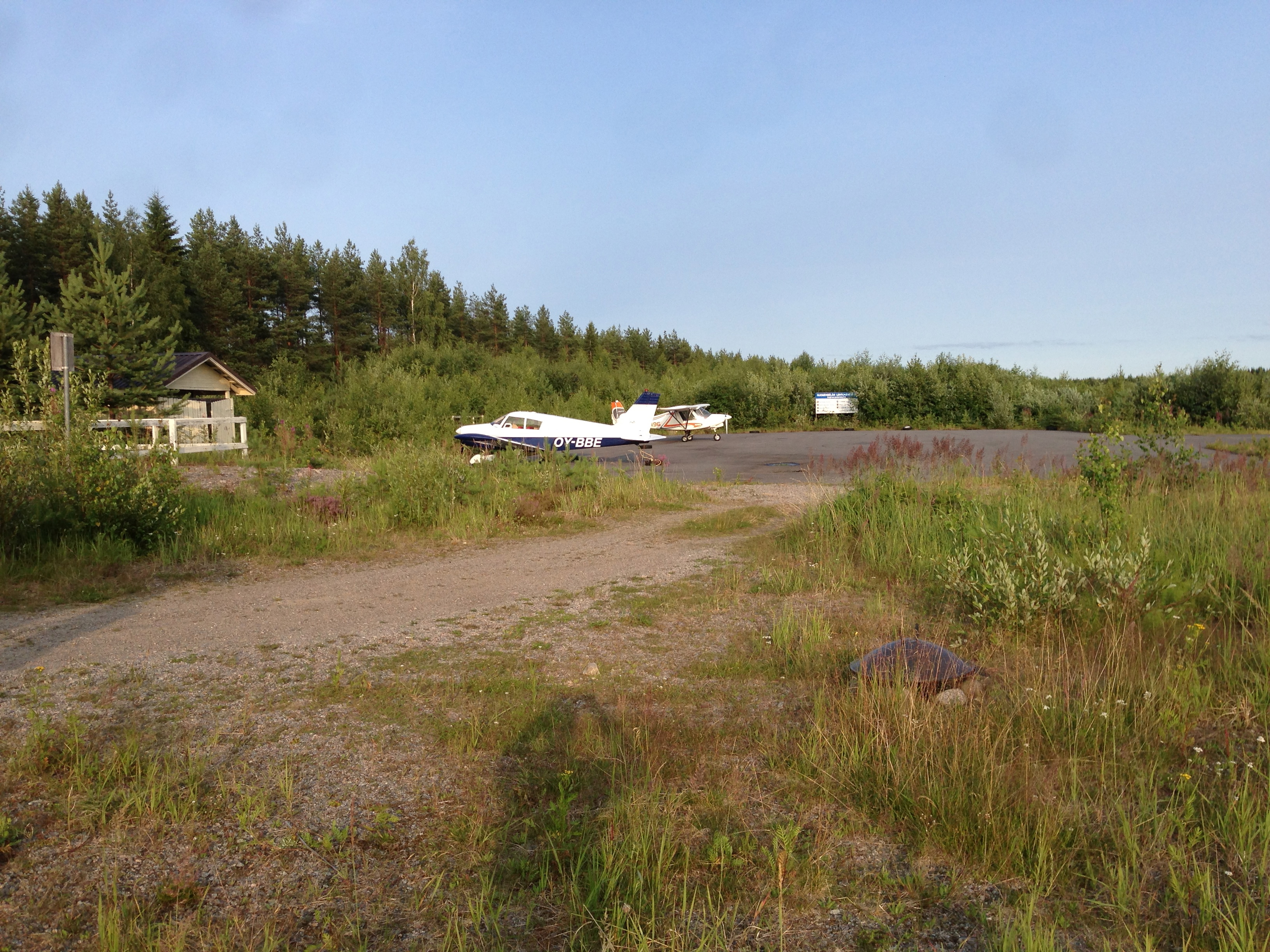
- IATA: none; ICAO: EFKV

Summary
- Airport type: Public
- Operator: Suomenselän Lentokenttä Oy
- Location: Kivijärvi, Finland
- Elevation AMSL: 502 ft / 153 m
- Coordinates: 63°07′31″N 025°07′27″E

Map
- Location within Finland

Runways
| Direction | Length | | Surface |
| Direction | m | ft | Surface |
|---|---|---|---|
| 12/30 | 900 | 2,953 | Asphalt |
- Source: VFR Finland

Kivijärvi Airfield is an airfield in Kivijärvi, Finland, about 1 nautical mile (1.9 km; 1.2 mi) northeast of Kivijärvi centre.

== See also ==
- List of airports in Finland
