= Pyhäsalmi Airfield =

Pyhäsalmi Airfield Pyhäsalmen lentokenttä
- IATA: none; ICAO: EFPY

Summary
- Operator: Pyhäsalmen Lentokenttä Oy
- Location: Pyhäjärvi, Finland
- Elevation AMSL: 528 ft / 161 m
- Coordinates: 63°43′45″N 025°55′55″E

Map
- Location within Finland

Runways
Direction	Length		Surface
Direction	m	ft	Surface
15/33	1,000	3,281	Asphalt
- Source: VFR Finland

Pyhäsalmi Airfield is an airfield in Pyhäjärvi, Finland. It is located along the main road 4 (E75), about 8 kilometres (5 mi) north-northwest of Pyhäsalmi, the centre of Pyhäjärvi.

== See also ==
- List of airports in Finland
