= Eura Airfield =

Eura Airfield Euran lentokenttä
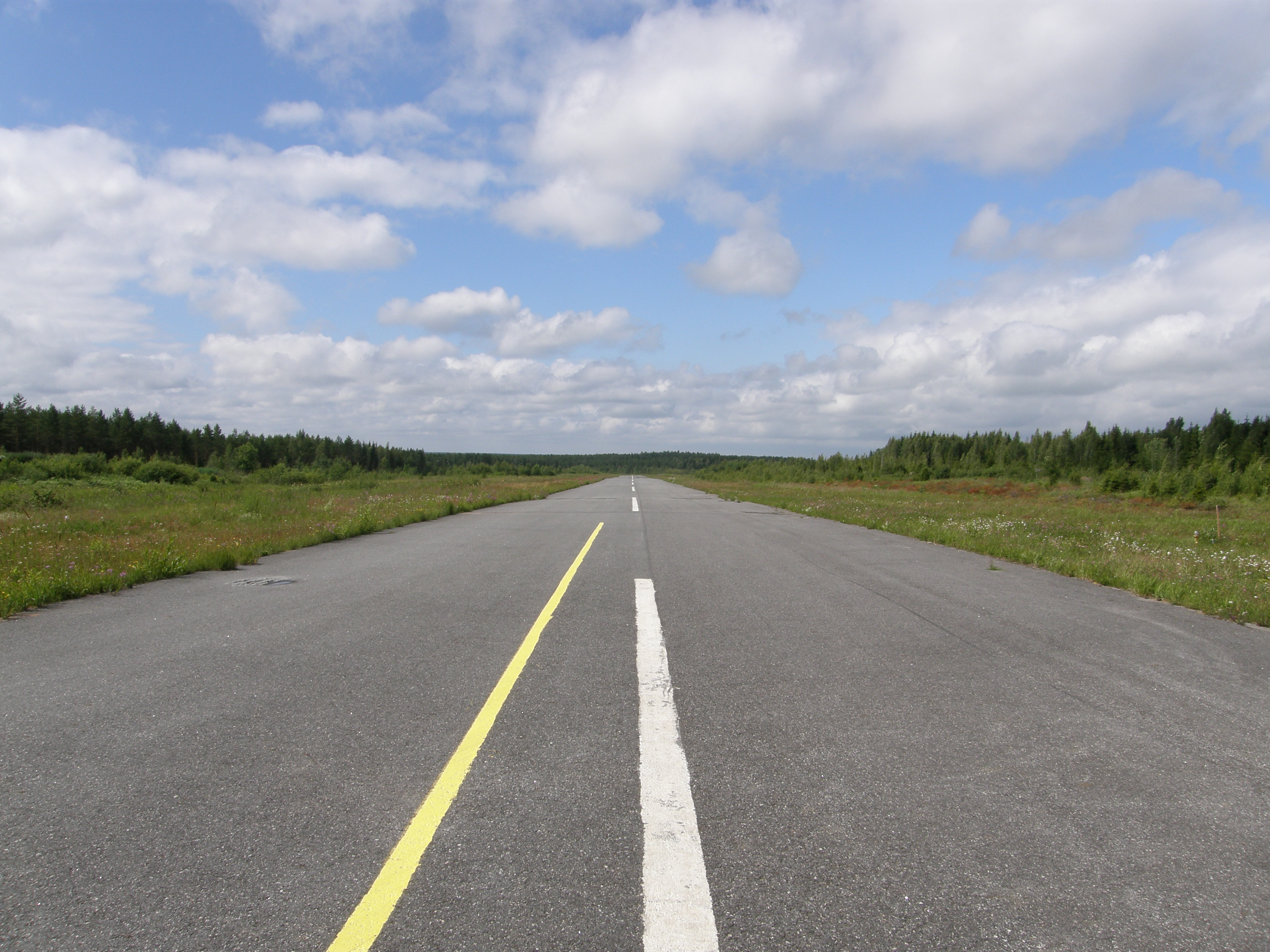
- The runway of Eura Airfield
- IATA: none; ICAO: EFEU

Summary
- Operator: Kauttuan Ilmailukerho r.y.
- Location: Eura, Finland
- Elevation AMSL: 259 ft / 79 m
- Coordinates: 61°06′58″N 022°12′05″E

Map
- Location within Finland

Runways
Direction	Length		Surface
Direction	m	ft	Surface
11/29	800	2,625	asphalt
- Source: VFR Finland

Eura Airfield (ICAO: EFEU) is an airfield in Eura, Finland, about 4 kilometres (2.5 mi) south west of Eura centre. It is operated by Kauttuan Ilmailukerho r.y. (Kauttua Aviation Club).

== See also ==
- List of airports in Finland
