= Tomek Valtonen =

Polish-born Finnish ice hockey player and coach

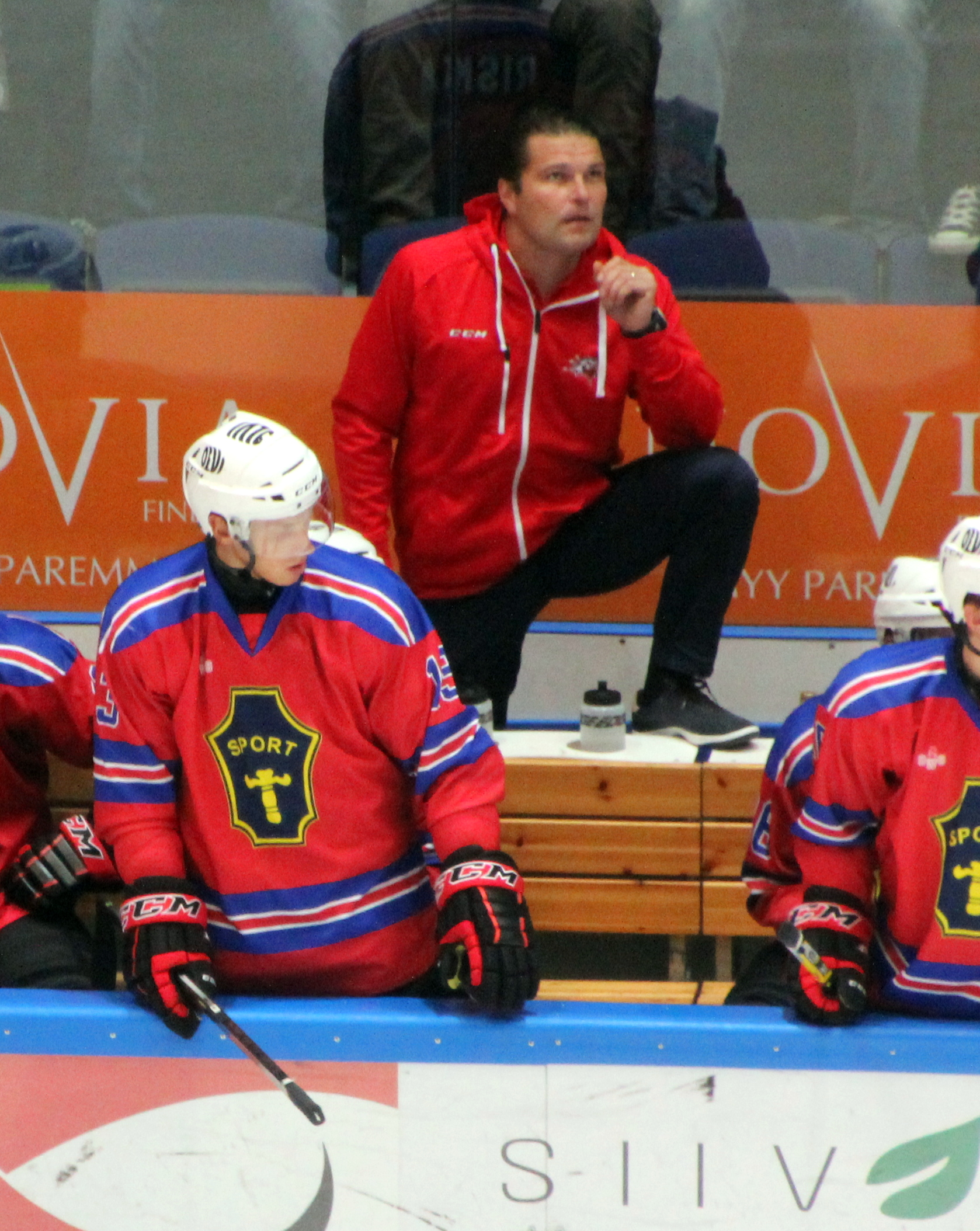
- Born: 8 January 1980 (age 46) Piotrków Trybunalski, Poland
- Height: 6 ft 1 in (185 cm)
- Weight: 216 lb (98 kg; 15 st 6 lb)
- Position: Left wing
- Shot: Left
- Played for: Ilves; Jokerit; Södertälje SK
- National team: Finland
- NHL draft: 56th overall, 1998; Detroit Red Wings
- Playing career: 1997–2009

Tomasz Valtonen (born 8 January 1980) is a Polish-born Finnish former professional ice hockey forward. He was the head coach for Jokerit in the Liiga until his dismissal on September 27, 2026. He coached the Poland men's national ice hockey team from 2018 to 2020. Valtonen was drafted by the Detroit Red Wings as their second-round draft pick (56th overall) in the 1998 NHL entry draft.

== Playing career ==
Valtonen was born in Piotrków Trybunalski to a Polish mother and a Finnish father. The family moved to Finland when Tomek was young, and he grew up in Kitee.

He started his professional career in Ilves in 1997 and played his next season with the Plymouth Whalers in the OHL, and returned to the SM-liiga in 1999 and represented Jokerit until 2007, when he signed a two-year contract with Södertälje SK. Valtonen returned to SM-liiga and Jokerit for season 2008–2009.

Valtonen has won the SM-liiga championship, three silver medals, and the under-20s World Championship.

Medal record

Representing Finland

World Junior Championships
Gold medal – first place	1998 Finland	

IIHF European Junior Championships
Gold medal – first place	1997 Czech Republic	

== Coaching career ==
- Jokerit, A-juniors (2010–2012)
- Jokerit, (assistant coach 2012–2013 and head coach 2013–2014)
- Vaasan Sport, (2014–2018)
- Poland national ice hockey team, (2018–2020)
- Podhale Nowy Targ, (2018–2019)
- Ravensburg Towerstars (2019)
- Mora IK (2019–2020)
- HK Dukla Michalovce (2020–2022, 2024–2025)
- HC Pustertal Wölfe (2022–2024)
- Jokerit (2025–2026)

== Career statistics ==
			Regular Season					Playoffs
Season	Team	League	GP	G	A	Pts	PIM	GP	G	A	Pts	PIM
1997–98	Ilves	SM-liiga	19	1	0	1	14	3	-	-	-	-
1998–99	Plymouth Whalers	OHL	43	8	16	24	53	7	1	0	1	0
1999–00	Jokerit	SM-liiga	41	0	3	3	63	9	1	0	1	8
2000–01	Jokerit	SM-liiga	45	3	2	5	138	3	0	0	0	0
2001–02	Jokerit	SM-liiga	55	4	4	8	65	11	2	1	3	2
2002–03	Jokerit	SM-liiga	51	5	9	14	38	10	1	1	2	4
2003–04	Jokerit	SM-liiga	53	15	16	31	78	8	1	3	4	8
2004–05	Jokerit	SM-liiga	35	6	8	14	59	12	3	0	3	10
2005–06	Jokerit	SM-liiga	51	11	6	17	130	--	--	--	--	--
2006–07	Jokerit	SM-liiga	54	19	16	35	121	10	3	4	7	2
2007–08	Södertälje SK	SEL	4	0	1	1	6	--	--	--	--	--
