= Nummela Airfield =

Nummela Airfield Nummelan lentokenttä Nummela flygfält
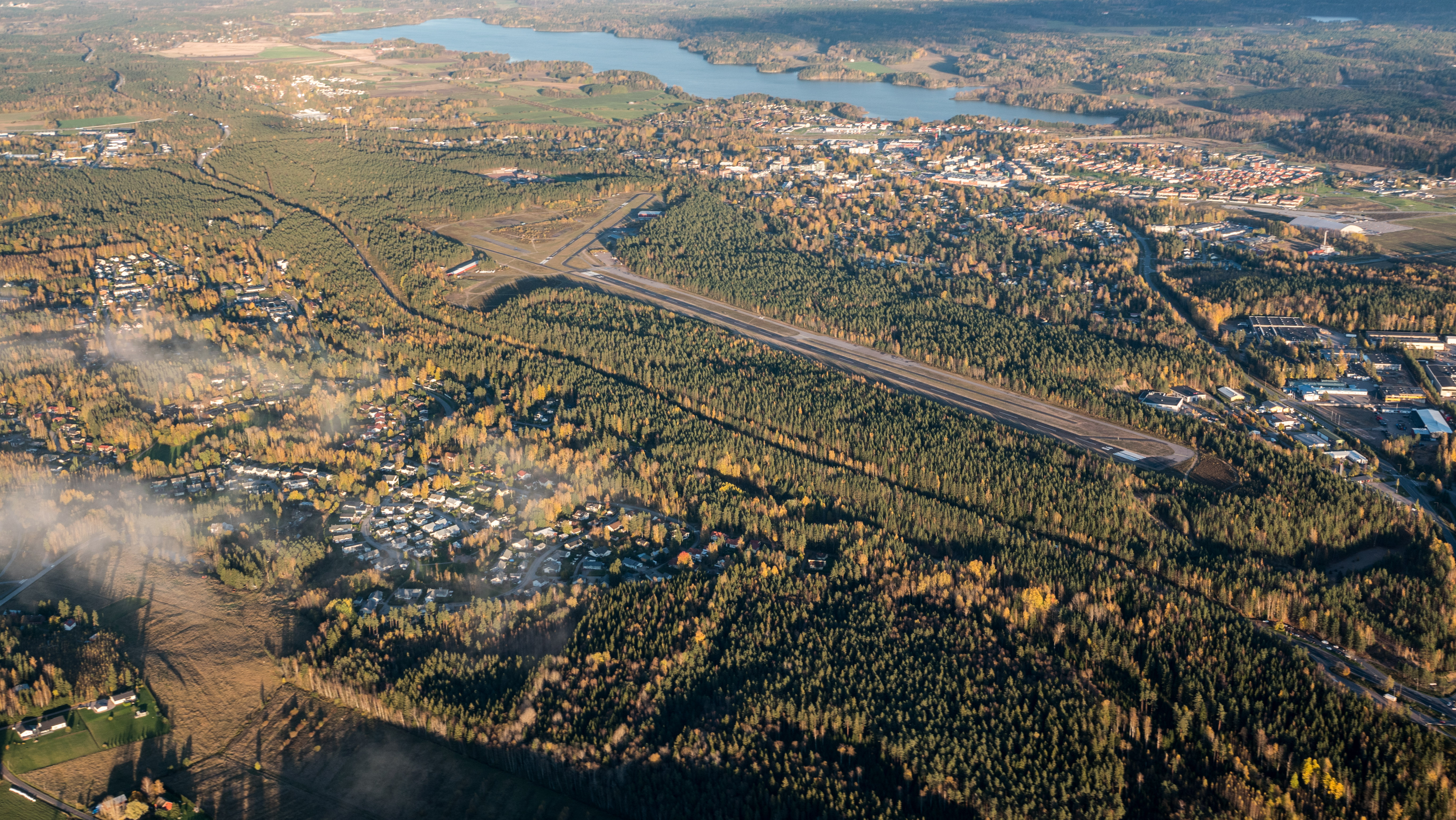
- Nummela Airfield
- IATA: QMN; ICAO: EFNU

Summary
- Operator: Nummelan Lentokenttäyhdistys ry
- Location: Nummela, Vihti, Finland
- Elevation AMSL: 370 ft (110 m)
- Coordinates: 60°20′02″N 024°17′47″E

Map
- Location within Finland

Runways
Direction	Length		Surface
Direction	m	ft	Surface
04/22	1,200	3,937	Asphalt
9/27	580	1,903	Asphalt/Gravel
- Source: Lentopaikat.fi EFNU

Nummela Airfield (IATA: QMN, ICAO: EFNU) is an airfield in Vihti, Finland, located some 40km west from both Helsinki and Helsinki Airport and sometimes referred to as Helsinki West. The active airfield is located on a ridge in the middle of Nummela town, and sees general aviation usage, flight and ultralight training and gliders. The airfield has seen increasing activity since the closure of Helsinki-Malmi airport in 2021. A number of companies and associations operate on the airfield, and there is a hotel located adjacent to the airfield. One of the four VFR runways has been upgraded with IFR equipment and runway lights in 2023.

== See also ==
- List of airports in Finland
