= Kitee Airfield =

Aerodrome in Finland

Kitee Airfield Kiteen lentokenttä
- IATA: KTQ; ICAO: EFIT

Summary
- Airport type: Public
- Operator: Town of Kitee
- Location: Kitee, Finland
- Elevation AMSL: 364 ft / 111 m
- Coordinates: 62°09′58″N 030°04′25″E
- Website: www.kitee.fi/...

Map
- Location within Finland

Runways
Direction	Length		Surface
Direction	m	ft	Surface
01/19	1,500	4,921	Asphalt
- Source: VFR Finland

Kitee Airfield (IATA: KTQ, ICAO: EFIT) is an aerodrome in Kitee, Finland.

== See also ==
- List of airports in Finland
