= Jämijärvi =

- Municipality
- Jämijärven kunta Jämijärvi kommun
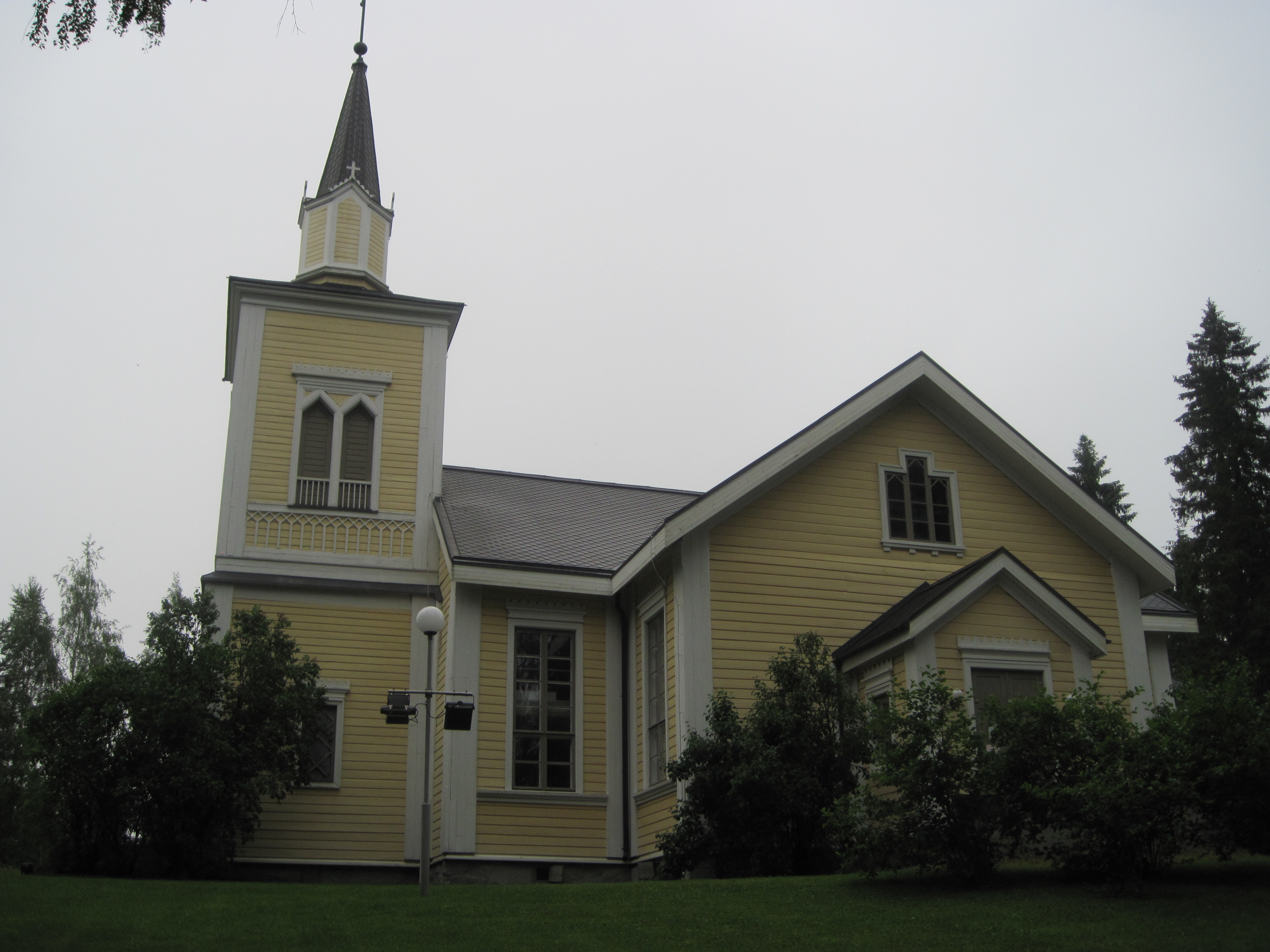
- Jämijärvi Church

- Coat of arms

- Location of Jämijärvi in Finland
- Interactive map of Jämijärvi
- Coordinates: 61°49′N 022°41.5′E
- Country: Finland
- Region: Satakunta
- Sub-region: Northern Satakunta
- Charter: 1865

Government
  - Municipal manager: Aku Autio

Area (2018-01-01)
  - Total: 224.34 km^{2} (86.62 sq mi)
  - Land: 215.09 km^{2} (83.05 sq mi)
  - Water: 9.99 km^{2} (3.86 sq mi)
  - Rank: 257th largest in Finland

Population (2025-12-31)
  - Total: 1,663
  - Rank: 273rd largest in Finland
  - Density: 7.73/km^{2} (20.0/sq mi)

Population by native language
  - Finnish: 96.7% (official)
  - Others: 3.3%

Population by age
  - 0 to 14: 14.6%
  - 15 to 64: 53.8%
  - 65 or older: 31.6%
- Time zone: UTC+02:00 (EET)
  - Summer (DST): UTC+03:00 (EEST)
- Climate: Dfc
- Website: jamijarvi.fi

Jämijärvi is a municipality of Finland.

It is located in the province of Western Finland and is part of the Satakunta region. The municipality has a population of 1,663 (31 December 2025) and covers an area of 224.34 square kilometres (86.62 sq mi) of which 9.99 km^{2} (3.86 sq mi) is water. The population density is 7.73 inhabitants per square kilometre (20.0/sq mi).

The municipality is unilingually Finnish.

Jämijärvi Airfield is one of the busiest general aviation airfields in Finland. A serious aviation accident happened in Jämijärvi in April 2014.
