= Kumlinge Airfield =

Kumlinge Airfield Kumlinge flygfält
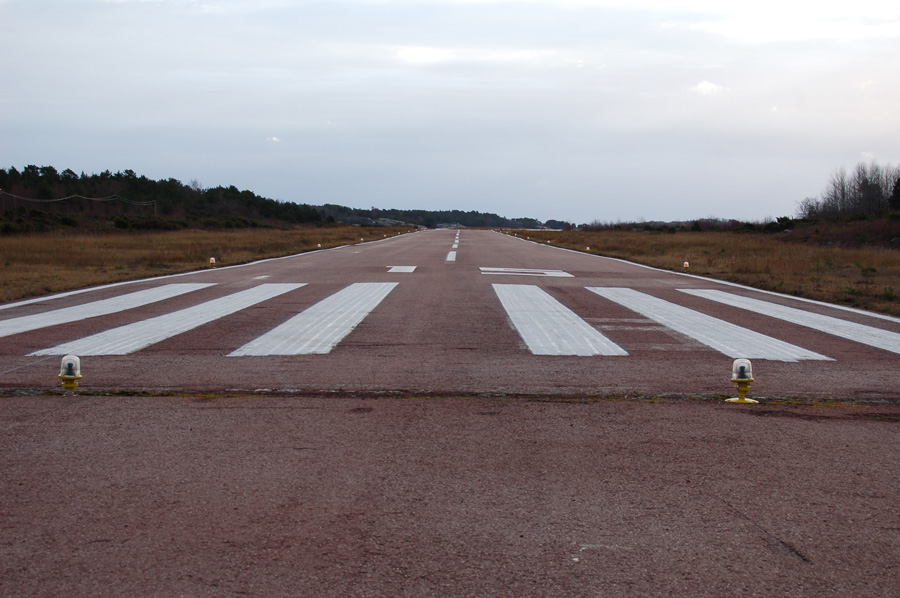
- Runway of Kumlinge Airfield
- IATA: none; ICAO: EFKG

Summary
- Operator: Government of Åland
- Location: Kumlinge, Åland, Finland
- Elevation AMSL: 7 ft / 2 m
- Coordinates: 60°14′49″N 020°48′17″E

Map
- Location within Finland

Runways
Direction	Length		Surface
Direction	m	ft	Surface
15/33	600	1,969	Asphalt
- Source: VFR Finland

Kumlinge Airfield (ICAO: EFKG) (Swedish: Kumlinge flygfält) is an airfield in Kumlinge, Åland, Finland.

The airfield was opened in 1975, and it is operated by the Government of Åland.

== See also ==
- List of airports in Finland
