= Helsinki-Malmi Airport =

Former airport that served Helsinki, Finland (1936–2021)

Helsinki-Malmi Airport Helsinki-Malmin lentoasema Helsingfors-Malm flygplats
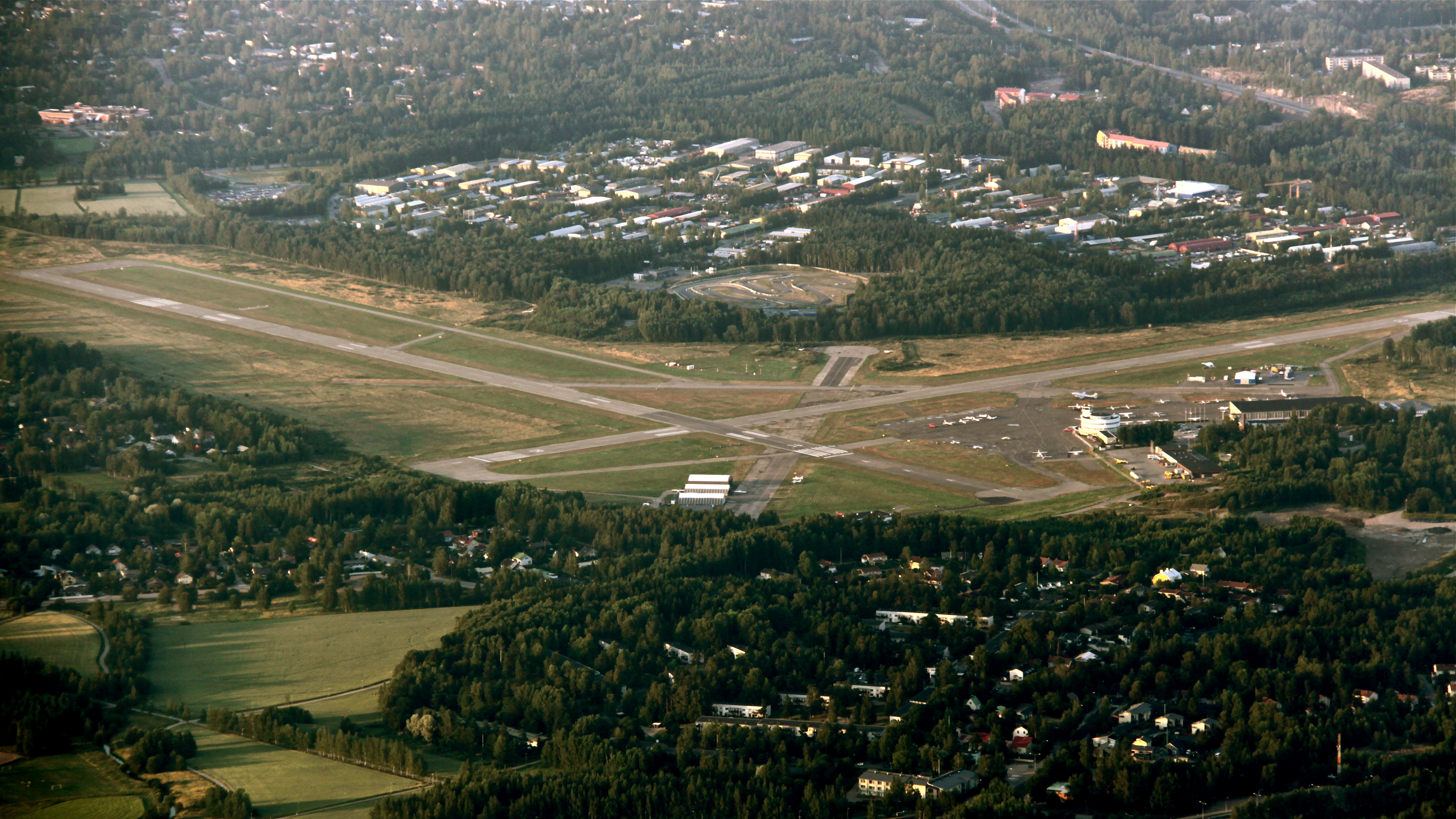
- IATA: HEM; ICAO: EFHF

Summary
- Airport type: Defunct
- Serves: Helsinki metropolitan area
- Location: Malmi, Helsinki, Finland
- Opened: 16 December 1936
- Closed: 14 March 2021
- Elevation AMSL: 17 m (56 ft)
- Coordinates: 60°15′14″N 025°02′39″E
- Website: www.malmiairport.fi/en

Map
- Location within Finland

Runways
Direction	Length		Surface
Direction	m	ft	Surface
18/36	1,280	4,199	Asphalt
09/27	1,024	3,360	Asphalt

Statistics (2009)
- Passengers: 1285
- Landings: 47144
- Source: AIP Finland; Statistics from Finavia

Helsinki-Malmi Airport (Finnish: Helsinki-Malmin lentoasema, Swedish: Helsingfors-Malm flygplats) (IATA: HEM, ICAO: EFHF) was an airfield that served Helsinki, the capital of Finland, located in the district of Malmi, 5.4 NM (10.0 km; 6.2 mi) north-north-east of the city centre. It was opened in 1936. Until the opening of Helsinki-Vantaa Airport in 1952, it was the main airport of Helsinki and of Finland. After that, it was used for general aviation and flight training, and remained the second-busiest airport in Finland, as measured by the number of landings, after Helsinki-Vantaa Airport. The city of Helsinki, which owns the land the airport is located on, terminated its lease agreement for aviation purposes in December 2019, and its remaining runway was closed in March 2021. After legal disputes, which were eventually resolved in favor of the city of Helsinki, the airport was removed from Fintraffic's eAIP manual in June 2025. The city plans to use the land for the construction of approximately 25,000 new apartments starting in 2024. The airfield area, including the runways and taxiways, was opened for public recreation in February 2022.

== History ==
The first land airport of Helsinki, located in Tattarisuo in the township of Malmi, became operational in December 1936. The area is now in the district of Malmi in Helsinki. The airplanes of Aero Ltd (now Finnair) were converted from floatplanes to land-based aircraft without delay and moved to the new airport along with general aviation aircraft. The functionalist terminal building was completed in 1938 and designed by architects Dag Englund and Vera Rosendahl. The official opening ceremony took place on 15 May 1938.

Helsinki-Malmi Airport was among the first in the world to be designed from the beginning as an international airport. It made travel to and from the capital of Finland much faster than before. In the late 1930s, domestic air routes already reached all the major cities in Finland, and in 1940 it became possible to fly even to Petsamo in the far north.

The Winter War interrupted civil aviation at Malmi, and the airport was taken over by the Finnish Air Force. Civilian traffic was moved to other airfields. In the Continuation War, both civilian and military traffic used Malmi Airport. When the Continuation War ended in September 1944, the airport was taken over by the Allied Control Commission. It was returned to the supervision of the Finns at the end of 1946.

During the war, bigger and heavier aircraft had been developed, and after the war the aircraft industry and commercial aviation business flourished. Malmi Airport was confronted by a new situation. It became evident that the runways, built originally on a deep layer of clay and swampy topsoil, would require considerable investment if they were to bear the weight of the new big airliners. The problem was particularly acute with Helsinki slated to host the 1952 Summer Olympics. Cost estimates showed that extending the runways, adding pilework under them and strengthening them in other ways would be prohibitively expensive, and the plans were abandoned.

A new airfield built to international standards was first opened to traffic in 1952 in Vantaa, in time for the Olympics, today known as Helsinki-Vantaa Airport. Scheduled traffic gradually moved from Malmi to the new airport. Malmi Airport continued to serve a new category of commercial aviation, charter flights, for many years. In special circumstances, it also acted as a backup airfield for Helsinki Airport for lighter passenger aircraft.

After the opening of Helsinki-Vantaa Airport, Malmi Airport was used mainly for general aviation. Professional flying education and professional aviation, as well as private aviation and aviation clubs, operated there. 75 to 80 percent of all flights were training flights, and in 2002, 50 percent of all pilots in Finland and two out of three professional pilots were trained there.

From the point of view of air traffic, Malmi Airport was the only free-schedule international airfield for lighter traffic within 150 km of the capital (Helsinki Airport is the only coordinated airport in Finland, i.e., it does not serve non-scheduled traffic without a runway slot application that must be filed 3 hours in advance). In 2013, about 7,500 landings of flights between Malmi and other airfields were logged just among Malmi's own flight operators, making Malmi the second-busiest airport for cross-country flights in Finland.

The aviation shows and other public events at the airport have typically been enjoyed by tens of thousands of spectators.

The Finnish Border Guard had its air base at the airport until the end of 2016, when the State moved all its operations elsewhere (about 14% of Malmi's operations), anticipating the airport's closure.

== Closure ==
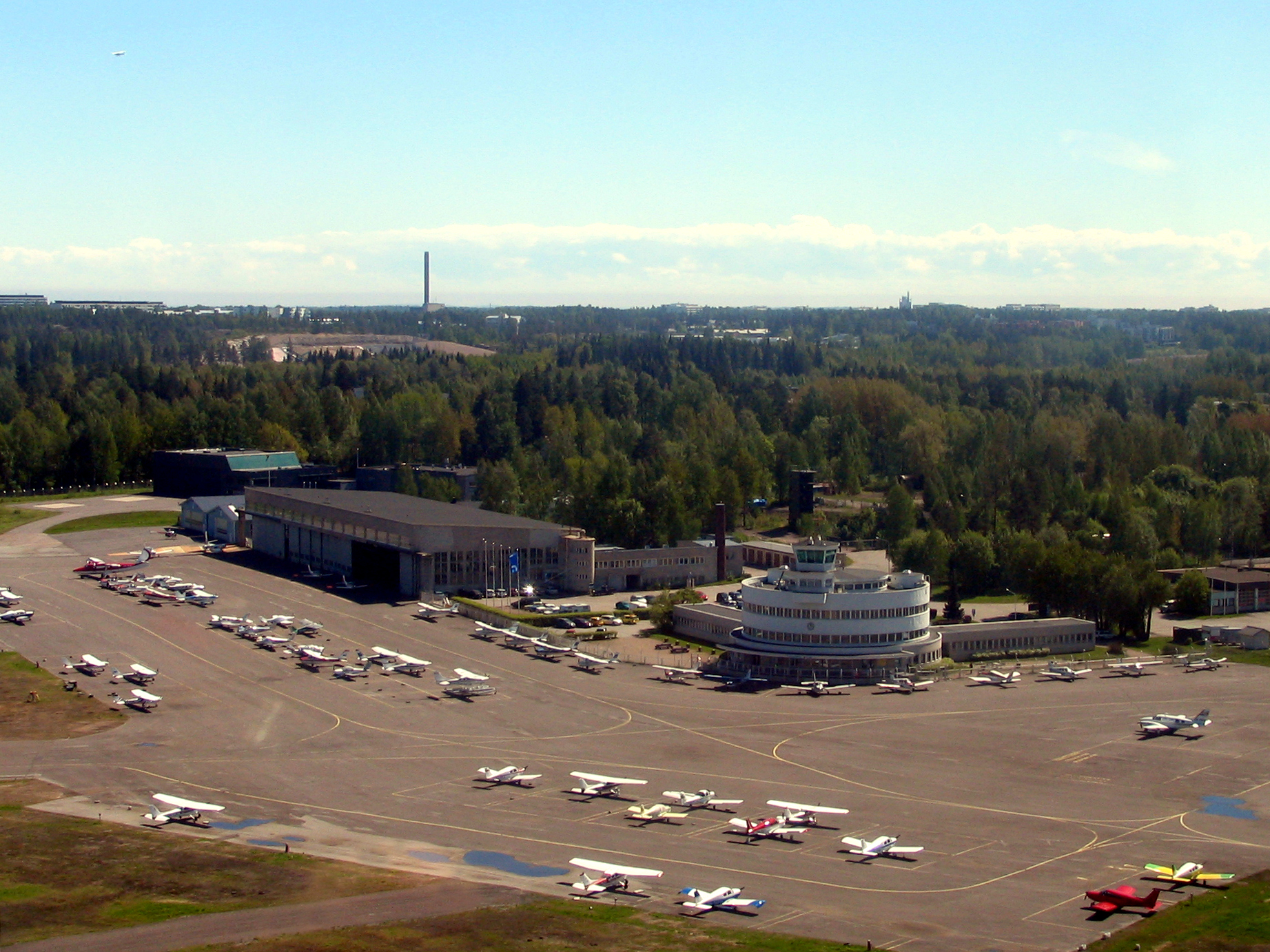
Airport field and terminal building

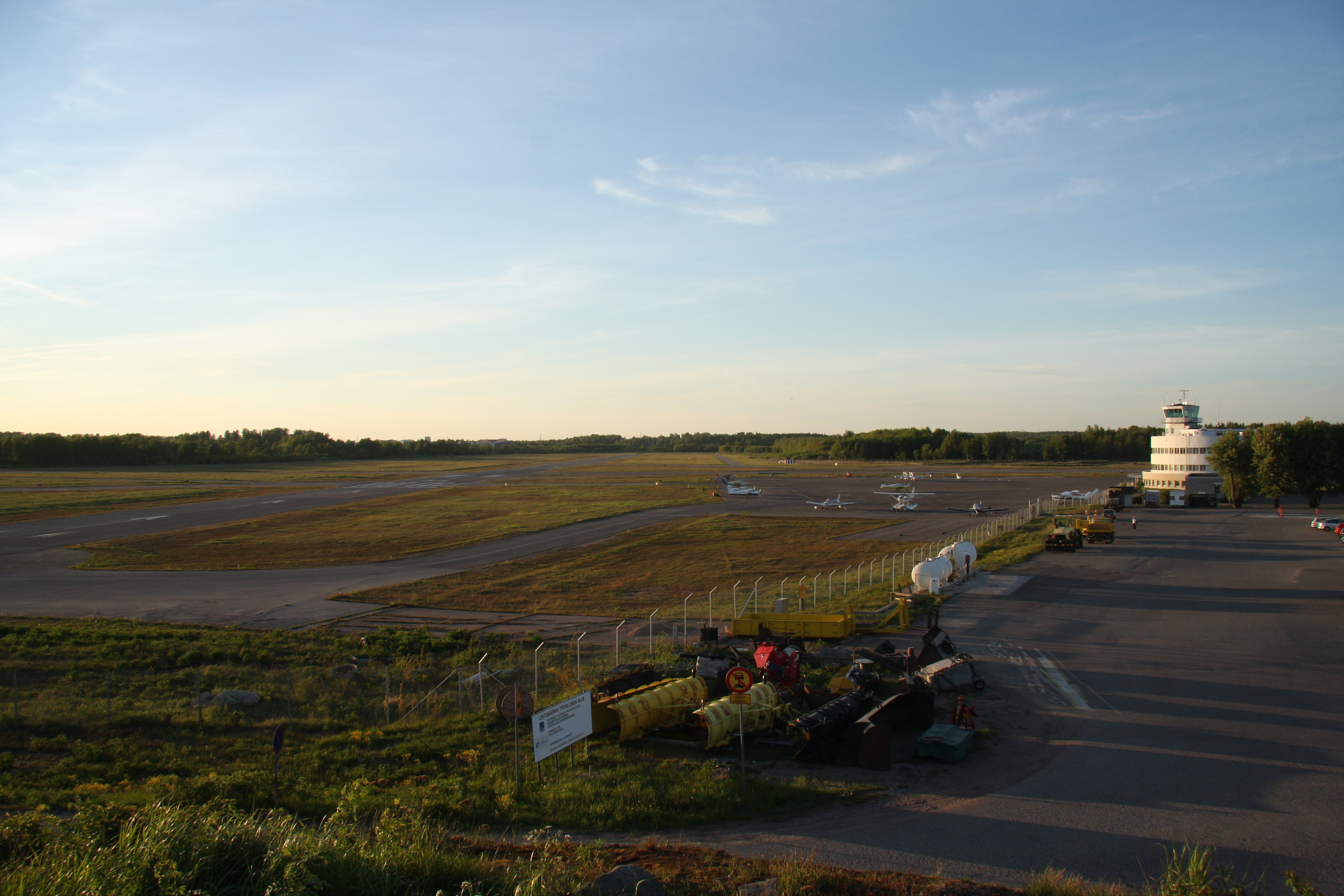
Runway 36 in the evening sun.

The closure of the airport was debated since about 2000, as the city of Helsinki needed the area for building housing for its growing population.

On 25 March 2014, the Finnish government made a framework decision in principle to close down Malmi Airport and hand it over to residential use by the early 2020s. A prerequisite written into the government's decision was that the Border Guard and civil aviation were to be transferred to a substitute airfield. The Border Guard moved away in 2016, but as of September 2022, no substituting airfield for civil aviation has been opened.

In late 2014, the Finnish state-owned airport operator Finavia Ltd sold the state's properties on Malmi Airport to the city of Helsinki. The ownership was transferred to the city on 1 January 2017. On 31 December 2016, Finavia withdrew its services from Malmi Airport.

The city leased the airport to the Malmi Airfield Association, with a three-year lease agreement covering about 39 hectares (30%) of the airport's area. The association operated the airport's aviation activities. The city terminated the airport's lease agreement for aviation purposes in December 2019. The lessee challenged the decision in court, but lost its case in District Court of Helsinki in December 2020.

The Malmi Airfield Association unsuccessfully challenged the residential zoning decision in court.

The city closed the remaining runway on 14 March 2021, ending its aviation operations.

=== Opposition ===
The closure of the airport attracted vocal opposition from the citizenry.

The citizens' law initiative "Lex Malmi", supported by more than 56,000 Finns in just two months' time and calling for keeping Malmi Airport in aviation use by means of legislation, was presented to the Finnish Parliament on 8 February 2017. The aim of the initiative was to secure the future accessibility of Helsinki and Finland by air and to save the internationally acclaimed cultural heritage site. In the end, the Speakers of Parliament prevented it from being voted on.

=== Alternative airport ===
In June 2005, the Ministry of Transport and Communications ordered the Civil Aviation Administration to formulate a new assessment of the alternatives and costs for a new general aviation airport near Helsinki. In February 2008, the Ministry of Transport and Communications commissioned an environmental impact assessment (EIA) of the alternative sites. In preparing the EIA, it turned out to be problematic that neither the Ministry nor any other party had a concrete project to build a new airport. The Ministry made in early 2010 a proposal to relevant planning authorities to organise co-operation in carrying out the EIA. Based on the response, the Ministry concluded that the preparation of the EIA would not be continued without participation of the authorities responsible for land-use planning. The question of a future general aviation airport would be studied in future regional land use plans.

Currently, general aviation from Malmi airport has relocated mostly to Nummela Airfield (aka Helsinki West Airfield), Hyvinkää Airfield (located to the north from Helsinki) and Pyhtää Redstone Aerodrome (aka Helsinki East Aerodrome).

== Current use ==
The airport is popular among people who like outdoor exercise because its environment offers natural scenery and a nature path encircles the airport area.

On 23 and 24 July 2019, the airport hosted Ed Sheeran's ÷ Tour for a total 108,000 attendees, setting a record for total tickets sold for two shows in Finland.

The exceptionally well preserved pre-World War II aviation milieu of Malmi Airport has also received international recognition. It has been selected to the worldwide List of 100 Most Endangered Cultural Sites 2004 by the World Monuments Fund, and re-selected to the 2006 list. The airport is also included in the Finnish selection of the international DoCoMoMo Workgroup dedicated to cataloguing and preserving buildings, monuments and sites of the modern movement. On 16 March 2016, Europe's leading cultural heritage organization Europa Nostra and the European Investment Bank Institute selected the airport as one of the seven most endangered cultural heritage sites in Europe 2016. In 2021, ICOMOS brought Malmi Airport yet again into the international spotlight of international cultural heritage in its report Heritage at Risk: World Report 2016-2019 on Monuments and Sites in Danger.

== Future ==
The city of Helsinki is constructing new housing on the former airport's land for about 25,000 residents, with construction planned to start in 2024.

== See also ==
- List of the largest airports in the Nordic countries

== Literature ==
- Sipilä; Haikarainen; Wahl (2008). Malmi – Helsingin lentoasema (in Finnish). Minerva Publishing Ltd. ISBN 978-952-492-145-9.
