= Kiteenjärvi =

Lake in North Karelia, Finland

- Location within Finland
- Location: Kitee
- Coordinates: 62°06′N 30°12′E
- Basin countries: Finland
- Surface area: 15.134 km^{2} (5.843 sq mi)
- Average depth: 2 m (6 ft 7 in)
- Max. depth: 13 m (43 ft)
- Water volume: 0.0303 km^{3} (24,600 acre⋅ft)
- Shore length^{1}: 35 km (22 mi)
- Surface elevation: 79.3 m (260 ft)
- Frozen: December–April
- ^{1} Shore length is not a well-defined measure.

Kiteenjärvi is a medium-sized lake in North Karelia region in Finland.

== See also ==
- List of lakes in Finland
