= Kitee =

Kitee Kides
- Town
- Kiteen kaupunki Kides stad
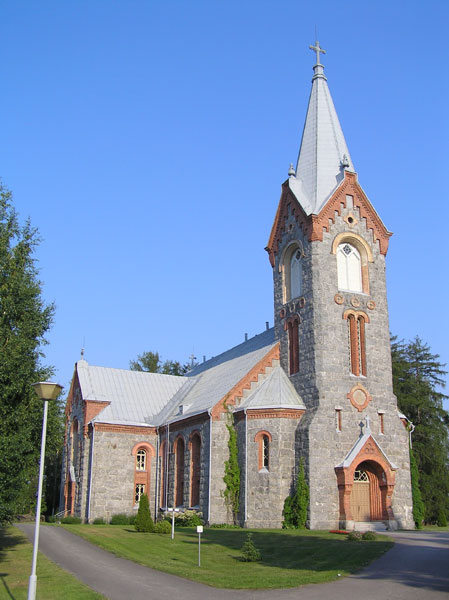
- Kitee Church

- Coat of arms

- Location of Kitee in Finland
- Interactive map of Kitee
- Coordinates: 62°06′N 030°08′E
- Country: Finland
- Region: North Karelia
- Sub-region: Central Karelia
- Charter: 1631
- City rights: 1992

Government
  - Town manager: Kirsi Hämäläinen

Area (2018-01-01)
  - Total: 1,724.41 km^{2} (665.80 sq mi)
  - Land: 1,253.82 km^{2} (484.10 sq mi)
  - Water: 275.61 km^{2} (106.41 sq mi)
  - Rank: 57th largest in Finland

Population (2025-12-31)
  - Total: 9,397
  - Rank: 102nd largest in Finland
  - Density: 7.49/km^{2} (19.4/sq mi)

Population by native language
  - Finnish: 91.2% (official)
  - Others: 8.8%

Population by age
  - 0 to 14: 11.2%
  - 15 to 64: 51.8%
  - 65 or older: 37%
- Time zone: UTC+02:00 (EET)
  - Summer (DST): UTC+03:00 (EEST)
- Website: www.kitee.fi/en/web/eng

Kitee (Finnish: [ˈkiteː]; Swedish: Kides) is a town and a municipality of Finland. It is located in the province of Eastern Finland and is part of the North Karelia region, about 65 kilometres (40 mi) south of Joensuu and about 175 kilometres (109 mi) northeast of Lappeenranta. The municipality has a population of 9,397 (31 December 2025) and covers an area of 1,724.41 square kilometres (665.80 sq mi) of which 275.61 km^{2} (106.41 sq mi) is water. The population density is 7.49 inhabitants per square kilometre (19.4/sq mi).

The municipality is unilingually Finnish. Neighbouring municipalities are Parikkala, Rääkkylä, Savonlinna and Tohmajärvi.

== History ==
Kitee is known as the ''moonshine city of Finland'' due to its legal and illegal moonshine Finnish: Pontikka manufacturing.

== Villages ==
- Haapasalo
- Haarajärvi
- Hammaskallio
- Heinoniemi
- Jaakkima
- Juurikka
- Kantosyrjä
- Kiteenkylä
- Kiteenlahti
- Kontiola
- Kunonniemi
- Lahdenkylä
- Leinovaara
- Loukunvaara
- Misola
- Muljula
- Niinikumpu
- Nivunki
- Närsäkkälä
- Ojamäki
- Piimäjärvi
- Potoskavaara
- Puhos
- Puhossalo
- Päätye
- Riihijärvi
- Rokkala
- Ruppovaara
- Satulavaara
- Suoparsaari
- Suorlahti
- Särkijärvi
- Säynejärvi
- Taipale
- Tasapää
- Tolosenmäki
- Varmoniemi
- Välivaara

== Sports ==
The men's pesäpallo club Kiteen Pallo -90 competes in the Superpesis national league, playing at Shore Field.

== Notable people ==
- The founding members of symphonic metal band Nightwish all hail from the town of Kitee:
  - Tarja Turunen, singer
  - Emppu Vuorinen, guitarist
  - Tuomas Holopainen, keyboardist
  - Sami Vänskä, bassist
  - Jukka Nevalainen, drummer
  - Only Holopainen and Vuorinen remain in the band to this day. (Forced by health issues to stop performing, Nevalainen remains part of the band's management).
- Antti Aalto, ski jumper
- Nils Ludvig Arppe, industrialist
- Tomek Valtonen, ice hockey coach and player

== See also ==
- Kitee Airfield
- Kitee Zoo
- Lake Kitee
