= Kumlinge =

- Municipality
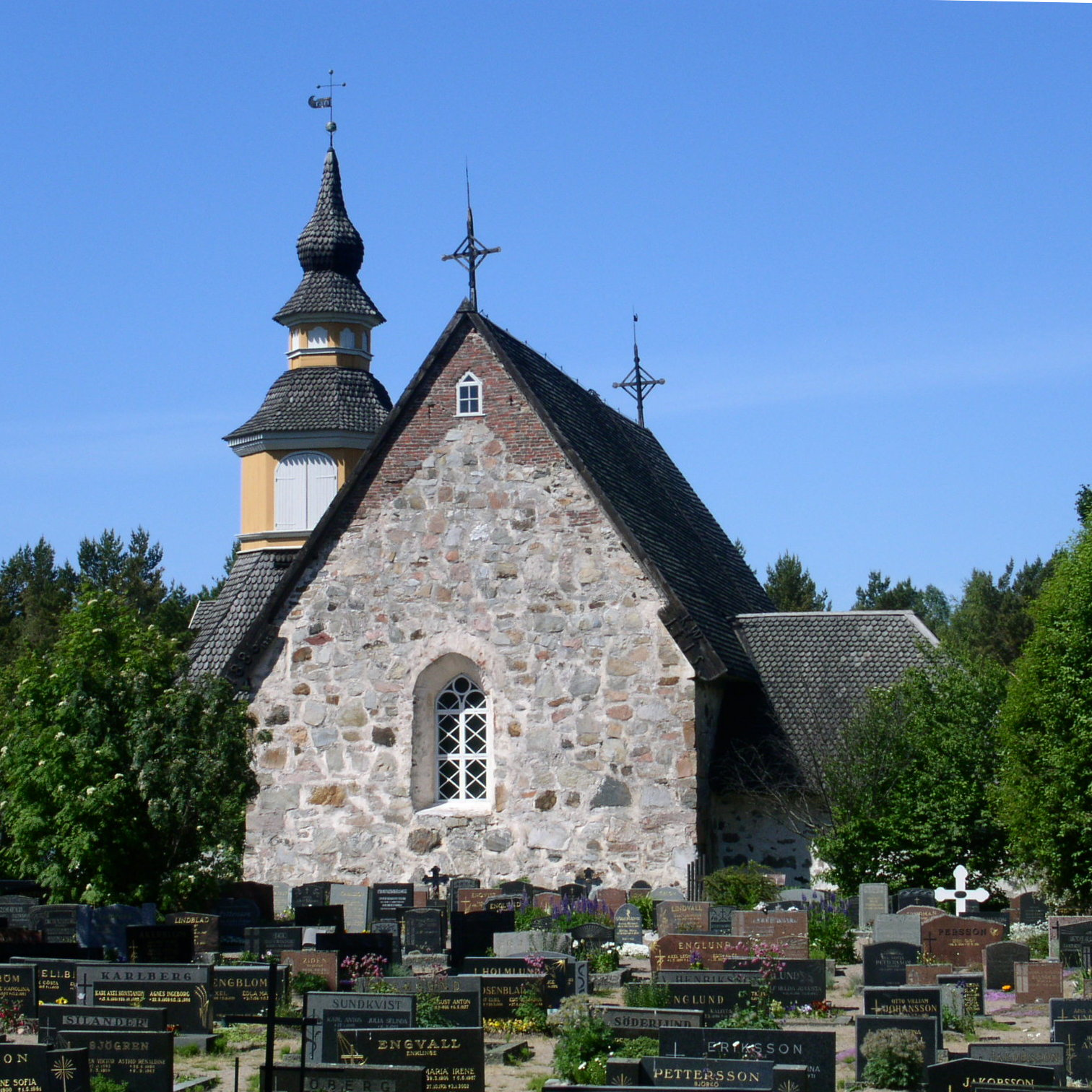
- Kumlinge Church

- Coat of arms

- Location in Finland

- Location in Åland
- Coordinates: 60°15.5′N 20°46.7′E
- Country: Finland
- Region: Åland

Area
  - Total: 865.04 km^{2} (333.99 sq mi)
  - Land: 118.31 km^{2} (45.68 sq mi)
  - Water: 746.73 km^{2} (288.31 sq mi)

Population (31 December 2023)
  - Total: 320
  - Density: 2.7/km^{2} (7.0/sq mi)
- Time zone: UTC+2 (EET)
  - Summer (DST): UTC+3 (EEST)
- Website: www.kumlinge.ax

Kumlinge is a municipality and group of islands in Åland, an autonomous region of Finland. The main island is also named Kumlinge. The name is thought to mean "rocky passage".

As of 31 December 2023, Kumlinge had a population of 320 and a total area of 865 km², of which 118 km² is land and 747 km² is water. The population density is about 2.7 inhabitants per square kilometre. Most residents speak Swedish as their first language, with small minorities speaking Finnish or other languages. Kumlinge Airfield is located on the main island and is used for charter and emergency flights.

== History ==
The islands of Kumlinge have a long history of settlement. They were first visited by Vikings, and permanent settlement began in the 13th century. By the 16th century, tax records mention about a dozen households, mostly farmers and fishermen. The population declined during the 20th century. Historian Håkan Skogsjö has documented Kumlinge's settlement history in detail.

== Geography and climate ==
Kumlinge consists of several inhabited islands surrounded by the Archipelago Sea. The largest islands are Kumlinge, Enklinge, Seglinge, and Björkö. The climate is classified as humid continental (Dfb), moderated by the sea.

Climate data for Kumlinge Kirkonkylä (1991–2020 normals, extremes 1984–2000 from Bärö, 2000–present from Kirkonkylä)
Month	Jan	Feb	Mar	Apr	May	Jun	Jul	Aug	Sep	Oct	Nov	Dec	Year
Record high °C (°F)	9.0 (48.2)	8.6 (47.5)	13.5 (56.3)	19.5 (67.1)	25.8 (78.4)	27.7 (81.9)	31.2 (88.2)	28.5 (83.3)	25.3 (77.5)	17.1 (62.8)	14.1 (57.4)	9.9 (49.8)	31.2 (88.2)
Mean maximum °C (°F)	5.2 (41.4)	4.8 (40.6)	8.5 (47.3)	14.8 (58.6)	21.1 (70.0)	23.3 (73.9)	26.2 (79.2)	24.9 (76.8)	20.1 (68.2)	14.5 (58.1)	9.8 (49.6)	6.8 (44.2)	26.7 (80.1)
Mean daily maximum °C (°F)	0.7 (33.3)	−0.4 (31.3)	2.2 (36.0)	7.0 (44.6)	12.4 (54.3)	17.0 (62.6)	20.4 (68.7)	19.9 (67.8)	15.2 (59.4)	9.4 (48.9)	5.3 (41.5)	2.6 (36.7)	9.3 (48.7)
Daily mean °C (°F)	−1.2 (29.8)	−2.5 (27.5)	−0.4 (31.3)	3.6 (38.5)	8.7 (47.7)	13.4 (56.1)	17.2 (63.0)	17.0 (62.6)	12.8 (55.0)	7.7 (45.9)	3.7 (38.7)	1.0 (33.8)	6.8 (44.2)
Mean daily minimum °C (°F)	−3.1 (26.4)	−4.7 (23.5)	−2.7 (27.1)	1.0 (33.8)	5.7 (42.3)	10.6 (51.1)	14.5 (58.1)	14.6 (58.3)	10.8 (51.4)	5.9 (42.6)	2.1 (35.8)	−0.7 (30.7)	4.5 (40.1)
Mean minimum °C (°F)	−11.4 (11.5)	−12.5 (9.5)	−9.1 (15.6)	−2.7 (27.1)	1.9 (35.4)	6.8 (44.2)	11.8 (53.2)	11.2 (52.2)	6.5 (43.7)	0.4 (32.7)	−2.8 (27.0)	−6.4 (20.5)	−15.7 (3.7)
Record low °C (°F)	−32.1 (−25.8)	−24.8 (−12.6)	−20.0 (−4.0)	−9.7 (14.5)	−2.4 (27.7)	1.5 (34.7)	7.0 (44.6)	6.3 (43.3)	−0.5 (31.1)	−5.4 (22.3)	−11.0 (12.2)	−20.0 (−4.0)	−32.1 (−25.8)
Source 1: FMI climatological normals for Finland 1991–2020
Source 2: Record highs and lows 2000–present

== Demographics ==
Kumlinge's population is concentrated on a few main islands. The table below lists the largest islands and their populations.

Island	Population
Kumlinge	318
Enklinge	87
Seglinge	51
Björkö	20
Other	3

== Sights ==
Kumlinge features several historical and cultural attractions. The village church, dedicated to St. Anne, dates from the 15th century. Hermas museigård and Sjölunds gårdsmuseum display the area's rural heritage. Fälberget has a memorial stone for a Russian battalion defeated in 1808. The historic King's Road postal route passes through the municipality, and the local pharmacy still operates with its original interior.

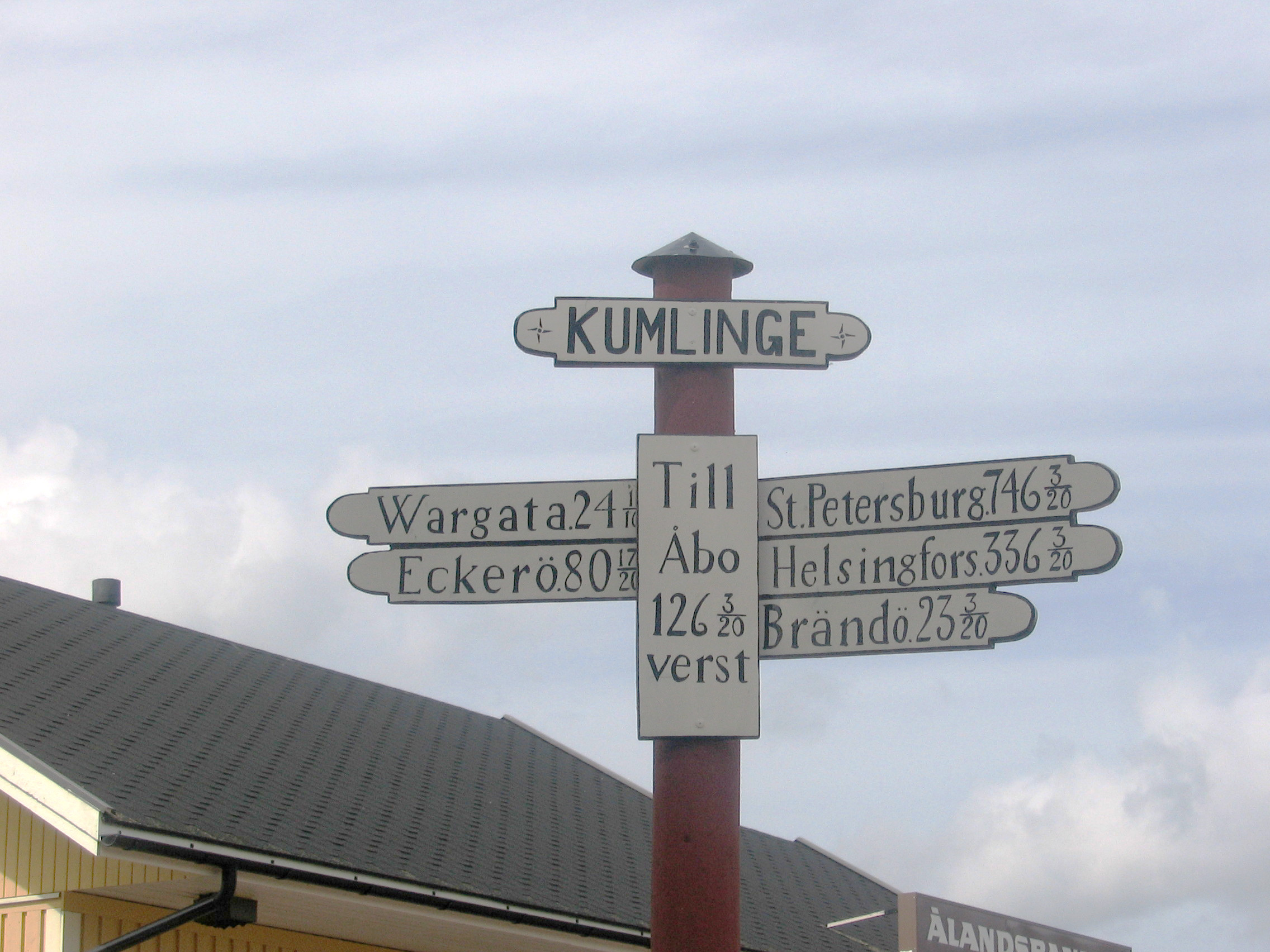
A milepost on the King's Road in Kumlinge

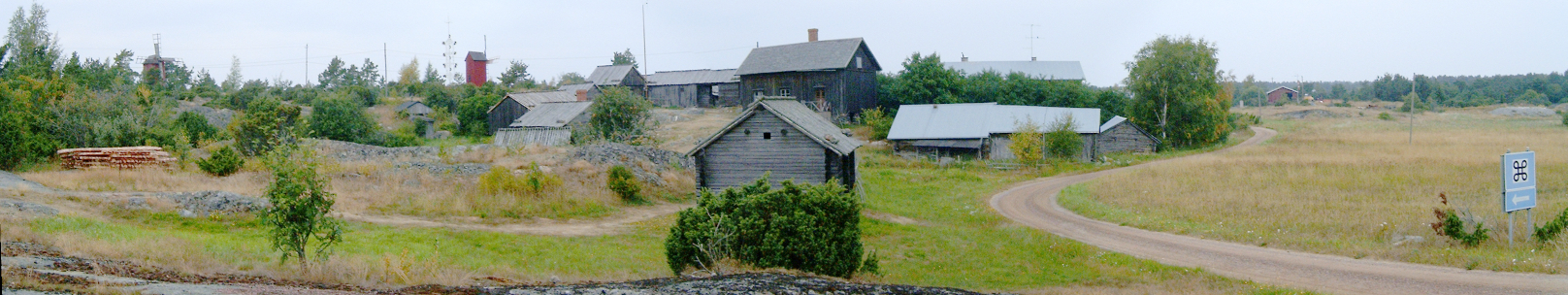
Panoramic view, Hermas, Kumlinge
