= Rautavaara Airfield =

Rautavaara Airfield Rautavaaran lentokenttä
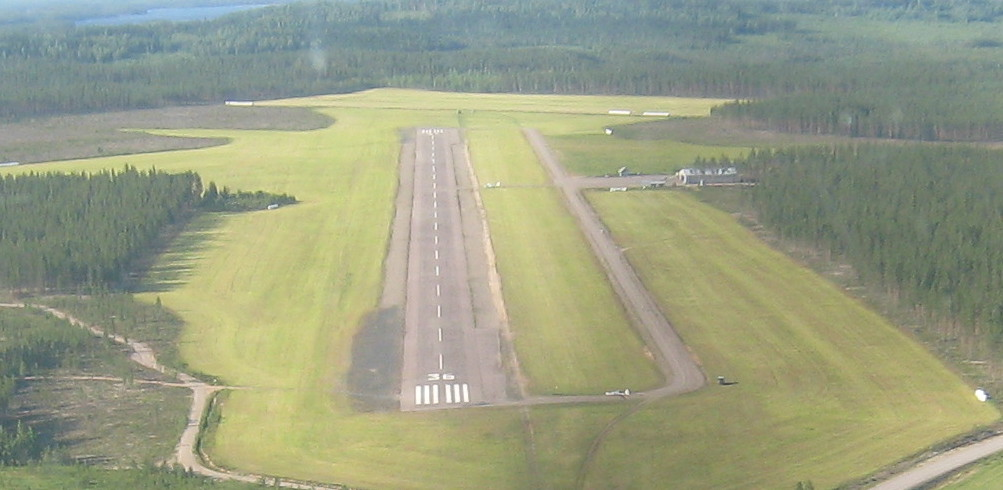
- Rautavaara Airfield
- IATA: none; ICAO: EFRA

Summary
- Operator: Rautavaara-Säätiö
- Location: Rautavaara, Finland
- Elevation AMSL: 476 ft / 145 m
- Coordinates: 63°25′27″N 028°07′27″E

Map
- Location within Finland

Runways
Direction	Length		Surface
Direction	m	ft	Surface
18/36	1,230	4,035	Oilgravel
05/23	500	1,640	Sand
- Source: VFR Finland

Rautavaara Airfield (ICAO: EFRA) (Finnish: Rautavaaran lentokenttä or Rautavaaran lentokeskus) is an airfield in Rautavaara, Finland, about 15 kilometres (9 mi) southwest of Rautavaara municipal centre.
