= Vampula =

- Former municipality
- Vampulan kunta Vambula kommun
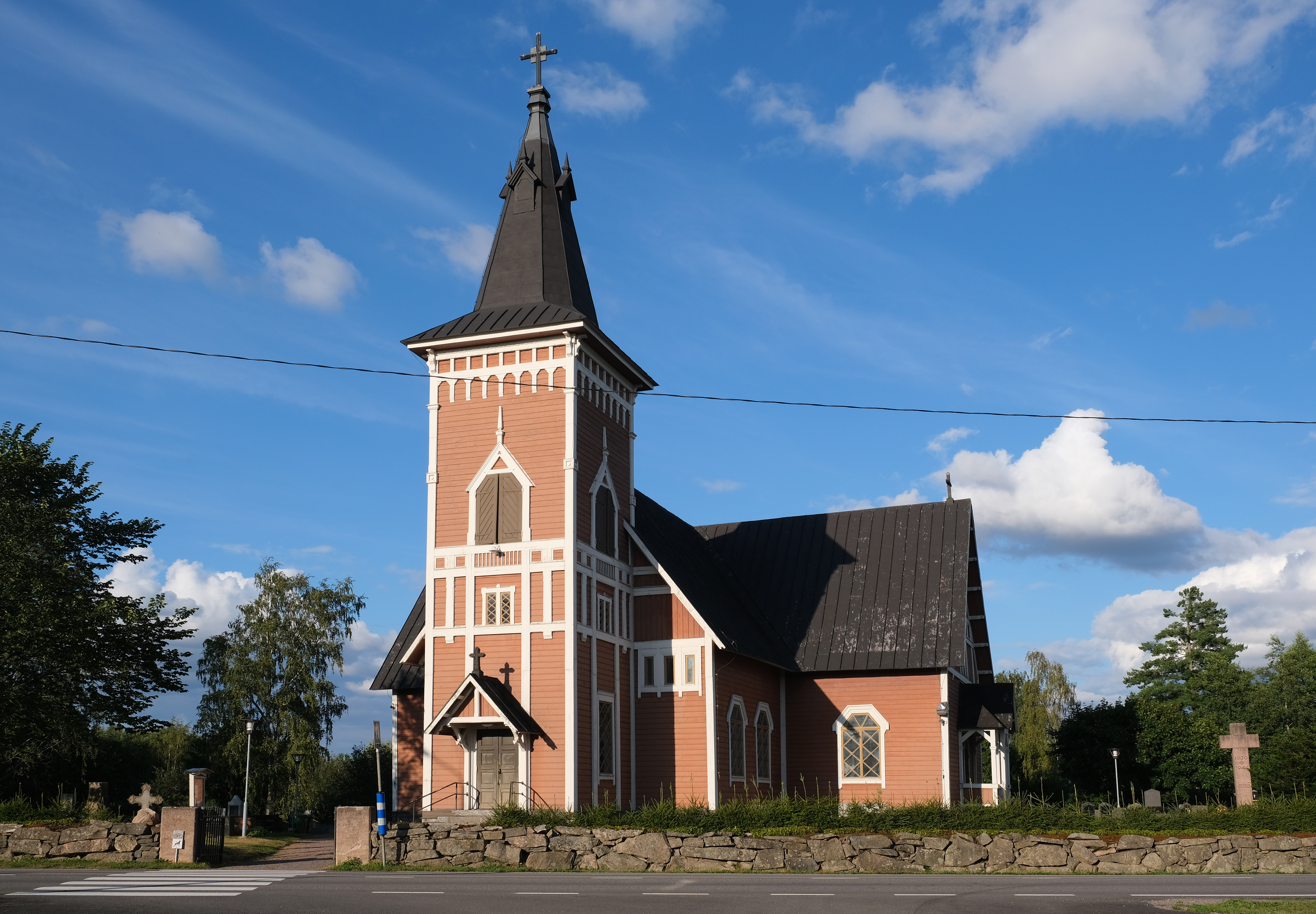
- Vampula Church

- Coat of arms

- Location of Vampula in Finland
- Coordinates: 61°01′35″N 022°41′25″E
- Country: Finland
- Region: Satakunta
- Sub-region: Pori sub-region
- Consolidated: 2009

Area
  - Total: 143.8 km^{2} (55.5 sq mi)
  - Land: 142.34 km^{2} (54.96 sq mi)
  - Water: 1.46 km^{2} (0.56 sq mi)

Population (2008-12-31)
  - Total: 1,677
  - Density: 11.78/km^{2} (30.51/sq mi)
- Time zone: UTC+2 (EET)
  - Summer (DST): UTC+3 (EEST)
- Climate: Dfc

Vampula is a former municipality of Finland. It was consolidated with Huittinen on 1 January 2009.

It is located in the province of Western Finland and is part of the Satakunta region. The municipality had a population of 1,677 (31 December 2008) and covered a land area of 142.34 square kilometres (54.96 sq mi). The population density was 11.78 inhabitants per square kilometre (30.5/sq mi).

The municipality was unilingually Finnish.

== History ==
A few discoveries of objects from the Stone Age have been made in the Vampula area. Farming started along Loimijoki already in the Iron Age, and by the 13th century at the latest, almost all of Vampula's major inhabited villages were recorded by the church authority. The first inhabitants arrived in the Vampula area probably from Huittinen, but the oldest church connections point to Säkylä.

In 1590, four householders built a small log church at their own expense. This first sanctuary is used as a motif for the municipality's coat of arms, which depicts a cross and four nails as a metaphor for the builders. Vampula got its own municipal administration in 1867. The first public school opened in Sallila village in 1878, and was followed by schools in Soinila (1897), Kukonharjan-Murro (1910) and Huhtaa (1915). The Finnish senate made a decision to establish Vampula congregation in 1891, but independence from Huittinen was only realized in 1900.
