= List of United States Army airfields =

The United States Army maintains various aircraft and support facilities, including airfields, even after the creation of the United States Air Force as a separate service branch in 1947.

== Active ==
=== United States and territories ===
Airfield	Army post/facility served	State/Territory	ICAO or FAA LID
Allen Army Airfield	Fort Greely	Alaska	PABI
Allen Stagefield Army Heliport	Fort Rucker	Alabama	05AL
Amedee Army Airfield	Sierra Army Depot	California	KAHC
Anniston Army Heliport	Anniston Army Depot	Alabama	04AL
Arrowhead Assault Strip	Fort Chaffee Maneuver Training Center	Arkansas	KAZU
Bicycle Lake Army Airfield	Fort Irwin	California	KBYS
Biggs Army Airfield	Fort Bliss	Texas	KBIF
Blackstone Army Airfield	Fort Picket	Virginia	KBKT
Bradshaw Army Airfield	Pohakuloa Training Area	Hawaii	PHSF
Bryant Army Heliport	Fort Richardson	Alaska	PAFR
Bucholz Army Airfield	Kwajalein Atoll	Marshall Islands	PKWA
Butts Army Airfield	Fort Carson	Colorado	KFCS
Cairns Army Airfield	Fort Rucker	Alabama	KOZR
Camp Blanding Army Airfield	Camp Blanding	Florida	2CB
Camp Peary Landing Strip	Camp Peary	Virginia	W94
Campbell Army Airfield	Fort Campbell	Kentucky	KHOP
Davison Army Airfield	Fort Belvoir	Virginia	KDAA
Dawson Army Airfield	Camp Dawson	West Virginia	3G5
Dillingham Army Airfield	Dillingham Military Reservation	Hawaii	PHDH
Dyess Army Airfield	Reagan Test Site	Marshall Islands	PKRO
Felker Army Airfield	Fort Eustis	Virginia	KFAF
Forney Army Airfield	Fort Leonard Wood	Missouri	KTBN
Fort Harrison Army Airfield	Fort Harrison	Montana	MT15
Godman Army Airfield	Fort Knox	Kentucky	KFTK
Gray Army Airfield	Fort Lewis	Washington	KGRF
Grayling Army Airfield	Camp Grayling	Michigan	KGOV
Hagler Army Airfield	Camp Shelby	Mississippi	KSLJ
Henry Post Army Airfield	Fort Sill	Oklahoma	KFSI
Hunter Army Airfield	Fort Stewart	Georgia	KSVN
Ladd Army Airfield	Fort Wainwright	Alaska	PAFB
Laguna Army Airfield	Yuma Proving Ground	Arizona	KLGF
Lawson Army Airfield	Fort Benning	Georgia	KLSF
Libby Army Airfield	Fort Huachuca	Arizona	KFHU
Los Alamitos Army Airfield		California	KSLI
Mackall Army Airfield	Camp Mackall	North Carolina	KHFF
Marshall Army Airfield	Fort Riley	Kansas	KFRI
Mary Walker Landing Zone	Fort A.P. Hill	Virginia	KAPH
Michael Army Airfield	Dugway Proving Ground	Utah	KDPG
Muir Army Airfield	Fort Indiantown Gap	Pennsylvania	KMUI
Pentagon Army Heliport	The Pentagon	Virginia	KJPN
Phillips Army Airfield	Aberdeen Proving Ground	Maryland	KAPG
Maks Army Airfield	Fort Polk	Louisiana	KPOE
Ray S. Miller Army Airfield	Camp Ripley	Minnesota	KRYM
Redstone Army Airfield	Redstone Arsenal	Alabama	KHUA
Robert Gray Army Airfield	Fort Hood	Texas	KGRK
Robinson Army Airfield	Robinson Maneuver Training Center	Arkansas	KRBM
Sabre Army Airfield	Fort Campbell	Tennessee	KEOD
Sherman Army Airfield	Fort Leavenworth	Kansas	KFLV
Simmons Army Airfield	Fort Bragg	North Carolina	KFBG
Stallion Army Airfield	White Sands Missile Range	New Mexico	95E
Vagabond Army Airfield	Yakima Training Center	Washington	KFCT
Wheeler Army Airfield	Schofield Barracks	Hawaii	PHHI
Wheeler-Sack Army Airfield	Fort Drum	New York	KGTB
Wright Army Airfield	Fort Stewart	Georgia	KLHW
Yoakum–DeFrenn Army Heliport	Fort Hood	Texas	KHLR

=== Worldwide ===
Airfield	Army post/facility served	Country	ICAO
Ansbach Army Heliport	Katterbach Kaserne	Germany	ETEB
Camp Bondsteel Army Heliport	Camp Bondsteel	Kosovo	BK12 (Note: LID assigned by the NGA, not ICAO code)
Desiderio Army Airfield	Camp Humphreys	Korea	RKSG
Grafenwöhr Army Airfield	Grafenwöhr Training Area	Germany	ETIC
Hohenfels Army Airfield	Hohenfels Training Area	Germany	ETIH
Illesheim Army Heliport	Storck Barracks	Germany	ETIK
Kastner Army Heliport	Camp Zama	Japan	RJTR
Patton Army Heliport	Camp Arifjan	Kuwait	OK2A
Stuttgart Army Airfield		Germany	EDDS (Note: ICAO code and facilities shared with Stuttgart Airport)
Udairi Landing Zone	Camp Buehring	Kuwait	OKDI
Wiesbaden Army Airfield	Lucius D. Clay Kaserne	Germany	ETOU

== Closed ==
=== United States and territories ===
Airfield	Army post/naval post/facility served	State	Period of operation	Current use
Adams Field		Arkansas	1917-1930	Bill and Hillary Clinton National Airport
Blytheville Army Air Field		Arkansas	1942-1946	Arkansas International Airport
Bruning Army Air Field		Nebraska	1942–1945	Mid-America Feed Yard
Condron Army Airfield	White Sands Missile Range	New Mexico	1945–2015	Drone operations
Courtland Army Airfield		Alabama	1942–1946	Courtland Airport
Dodd Army Airfield		Texas	1911–1945	Fort Sam Houston
Dodge City Army Air Field		Kansas	1942–1945	Stanley Feed Yard
Gardner Army Airfield		California	1941–1945	Farmland
George Field		Illinois		Lawrenceville–Vincennes International Airport
Harris Neck Army Air Field		Georgia	1942–1944	Harris Neck National Wildlife Refuge
Hobbs Army Airfield		New Mexico	1942–1948	Hobbs Industrial Airpark
Lemoore Army Air Field		California	1942–1945	Farmland
Lowry Army Airfield		Colorado		Housing
Marfa Army Airfield		Texas		Marfa Municipal Airport
McCook Army Air Field		Nebraska		Farmland
Moore Army Airfield	Fort Devens	Massachusetts	1929–1995	State Police driver training facility
Miller Field		New York		Park
Muskogee Army Airfield		Oklahoma		Love-Hatbox Sports Complex
Newport Army Air Field		Arkansas	1942-1944	Newport Municipal Airport
Ross Army Airfield		California		Santa Anita Golf Course
Smoky Hill Army Airfield		Kansas		Salina Regional Airport
Stuttgart Army Air Field		Arkansas	1942-1944	Stuttgart Municipal Airport
Travis Field		Georgia	1942-1960	Savannah/Hilton Head International Airport
Waco Army Airfield		Texas		TSTC Waco Airport
Walnut Ridge Army Air Field		Arkansas	1942-1944	Walnut Ridge Regional Airport

=== Worldwide ===
Airfield	Army post/facility served	Location	Period of operation	Current use
Armstrong Army Airfield		Germany	1958–2005	
Bad Kreuznach Army Airfield		Germany	1945–2001	
Bad Hersfeld Airfield		Germany	1952–1992	Flugplatz Bad Hersfeld
Bad Toelz Army Airfield		Germany	1945–1991	
Bamberg Army Airfield		Germany	1912–2012	Bamberg-Breitenau Airfield
Beek Airfield		Netherlands	1945-1945	Maastricht Aachen Airport
Coleman Army Airfield	Coleman Barracks	Germany	1945–2013	
Stephenville Army Airfield	Aerospace Defense Command	Canada	1941–1966	Stephenville International Airport
Giebelstadt Army Airfield		Germany	1935–2006	
Goose Bay Army Airfield	Goose Air Defense Sector	Canada	1941–1976	CFB Goose Bay
Griesheim Airport		Germany	1908–1992	
Hanau Army Airfield		Germany	1947–2006	
Haunstetten Airfield		Germany	1916–1964	
Heidelberg Airfield		Germany	1945–2014	
Hoppstädten Army Airfield		Germany	1956–1973	
Karlsruhe Airfield		Germany	19??-1995	Karlsruhe/Baden-Baden Airport
Ludwigsburg Army Airfield		Germany	1942–1992	
Maurice Rose Army Airfield		Germany	1951–2002	
McAndrew Army Airfield	Northeast Air Command	Newfoundland	1941–1948	Marine Atlantic
Mutlangen Army Airfield		Germany	1945–1991	
Pepperrell Army Airfield	Newfoundland Base Command	Canada	1945–1961	CFS St. John's
Schleissheim Army Airfield		Germany	1948–1973	Flugplatz Schleißheim
Tempelhof Central Airport		Germany	1923–1994	Tempelhofer Feld
Wildflecken Army Airfield		Germany		
Würzburg Army Airfield		Germany	1936–2008	

== Lists by state ==
- Alabama World War II Army airfields
- Alaska World War II Army airfields
- California World War II Army airfields
- Texas World War II Army airfields
