= 158th Aviation Regiment =

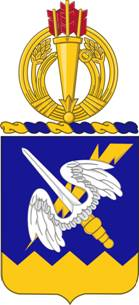
- Coat of arms
- Active: 1987 - 2026
- Country: United States
- Branch: United States Army
- Type: Aviation
- Motto: Challenge
- Mascot: Mr. Peanut
- Engagements: NTC 25-02, CSTX 24-01, The War on Collective Training (Ongoing)

Insignia
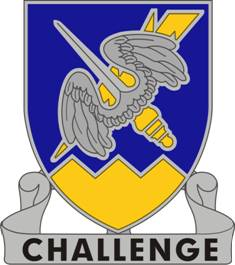
- Distinctive unit insignia

Aircraft flown
- Utility helicopter: UH-60L Blackhawk

The 158th Aviation Regiment is an aviation regiment of the United States Army.

It traces its heritage to the 158th Aviation Battalion. Company A, 158th Aviation Battalion, was activated in the Regular Army on 25 July 1968 at Fort Carson, Colorado; and Company C on the same date at Fort Riley, KS. Both became an element of the 101st Airborne Division. Company A was inactivated on 19 April 1979 at Fort Campbell, Kentucky; Company C on 16 October 1986 at Fort Campbell.

Both Companies A and C were redesignated as Battalion HHCs on 16 September 1987, for the 1st and 3rd Battalions, respectively.

== Structure ==
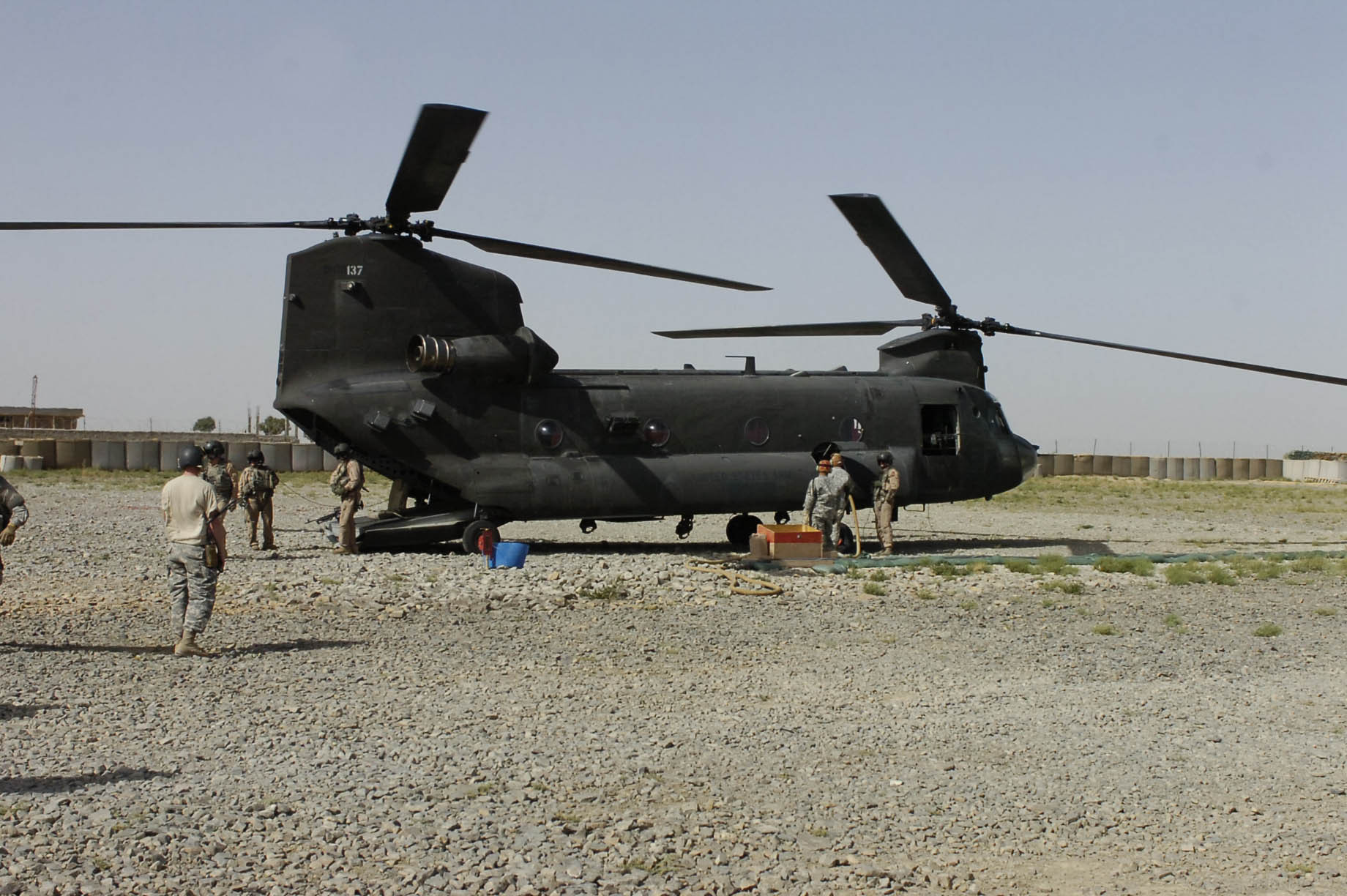
CH-47 Chinook helicopter on 25 July 2007, flown by Company A, 1st Battalion, 158th Aviation Regiment 'Yetis'

- 1st Assault Helicopter Battalion "Ghost Riders"
  - Company E
- 2nd Assault Helicopter Battalion
  - Company HHC "Hooligans"
  - Company A "Axe Men" (UH-60)
  - Company B "Big Foot" (UH-60)
  - Company C "Crazy Hawks" (UH-60)
  - Company D "Dark knights" (MNT)
  - Company E "Executioners" (FSC)
- 7th Battalion
  - Company B
  - Company C (HH-60M) (OR ARNG)
  - Company D
    - Detachment 1 (OR ARNG)
  - Company E
    - Detachment 1 (OR ARNG)
  - Company F

== 1st Battalion, 158th Aviation Regiment ==
The 1st Assault Helicopter Battalion, 158th Aviation Regiment, nicknamed the "Ghostriders", is headquartered at Conroe, Texas. The battalion flies UH-60 Black Hawks as part of the United States Army Reserve's 11th Theater Aviation Command. The battalion traces its lineage to Company A, 158th Aviation Battalion, activated on 25 July 1968, for assignment to the 101st Airborne Division (airmobile). The division, already in Vietnam, was transitioning from a parachute unit to a helicopter-transported airmobile unit. The 1st battalion was deactivated. The 1-158 AHB is currently set for inactivation in fall of 2026 as part of the Army Transformation initiative.

== 2nd Battalion, 158th Aviation Regiment ==
The 2nd Battalion was constituted on 25 July 1968, in the regular army as Company B, 158th Aviation Battalion, nickname "Lancer" an element of the 101st Airborne Division (airmobile), and activated at Fort Carson, Colorado. It was reorganized and redesignated on 16 September 1987, as Headquarters and Headquarters Company, 2nd Battalion, 158th Aviation, and relieved from assignment to the 101st Airborne Division (air assault)(organic elements concurrently constituted and activated), and on 15 September 1996 it was inactivated at Fort Hood, Texas. Headquarters and Headquarters Company, 2nd Battalion, 158th Aviation was redesignated on 16 October 1997 as Company B, 158th Aviation, and activated at Fort Hood, Texas, and then redesignated again on 1 October 2005 as Company B, 158th Aviation Regiment. It was inactivated there on 15 January 2008. On 17 October 2011 it was redesignated as Headquarters and Headquarters Company, 2nd Battalion, 158th Aviation Regiment, and activated at Joint Base Lewis-McChord, Washington (organic elements concurrently activated). 2nd Battalion, 158th Aviation Regiment received the overall Ellis D Parker Award on the 24th of January, 2024.

== 3rd Battalion, 158th Aviation Regiment ==
The 3rd Battalion was activated on 25 July 1968 in the regular army as Company C, 158th Aviation Battalion, an element of the 101st Airborne Division (airmobile), at Fort Riley, Kansas. It was inactivated 16 October 1986 at Fort Campbell, Kentucky and relieved from assignment to the 101st Airborne Division (air assault). The unit was redesignated 16 September 1987 as Headquarters and Headquarters Company, 3rd Battalion, 158th Aviation, but withdrawn from the regular army on 16 September 1988 and allotted to the army reserve at Glenview, Illinois, where it was inactivated and re-allotted to the regular army. The battalion was concurrently redesignated as Company C, 158th Aviation and activated in Germany. It was redesignated on 16 October 2000 as the 3d Battalion, 158th Aviation. As of mid-2001, a detachment from Foxtrot Company, 159th Aviation Regiment, was deployed to Camp Able Sentry, Macedonia, in support of KFOR and Operation Joint Guardian.

== Company D, 158th Aviation Regiment ==
Company D was activated on 25 July 1968 in the regular army as Company D, 158th Aviation Battalion, an element of the 101st Airborne Division (airmobile), and activated at Fort Carson, Colorado. It was inactivated on 30 September 1981 at Fort Campbell, Kentucky, and relieved from assignment to the 101st Airborne Division (air assault), then redesignated on 16 September 1987 as Headquarters and Headquarters Company, 4th Battalion, 158th Aviation, relieved from allotment to the regular army, allotted to the army reserve, and activated at Fort Devens, Massachusetts (organic elements concurrently constituted and activated). It was inactivated there on 1 September 1996. Redesignated on 16 October 1997 as Company D, 158th Aviation, it was relieved from allotment to the army reserve, allotted to the regular army, and activated in Germany, where it was again inactivated on 15 October 2000. Nine days later it was relieved from allotment to the regular army, allotted again to the army reserve, and subsequently activated on 16 September 2002 at Victorville, California.

== 5th Battalion, 158th Aviation Regiment ==
The 5th Battalion was reorganized and redesignated in 1987 as a parent regiment under the United States Army Regimental System. On 18 September 1987 at Giebelstadt Army Airfield (GAAF) in Giebelstadt, Germany, the lineage of Headquarters and Headquarters Company, 158th Aviation Battalion was reflagged as Headquarters and Headquarters Company, 5th Battalion, 158th Aviation, which was constituted and activated, using the assets of the 11th Aviation Battalion. The battalion's organic elements were subsequently constituted and activated. During the 1990s the 5th Battalion an element of the 12th Aviation Brigade, was the largest aviation battalion in the US Army. Units of the battalion were located in Giebelstadt and Wiesbaden, Germany and Aviano, Italy, and their mission included transportation of personnel and equipment. During combat or peacekeeping missions the 5th Battalion was also responsible for transporting V Corps leaders throughout the area of operations. Unit aircraft were a mixture of UH-60 Blackhawks and CH-47 Chinooks. Companies A and E of the battalion were located at Wiesbaden Air Base (WAB) in Wiesbaden, while Company B, activated on 16 October 1998, was stationed in Aviano. The activation of Company C at WAB was, at that time, projected for January 2000. This activation completed the army's doctrinal template of the Mission Ready Battalion. As of early 2000 the unit consisted of eight companies flying and maintaining UH-60 Black Hawks and CH-47 Chinooks. The battalion had a total of 70 aircraft, which was larger than the normal 24 in a then-standard aviation battalion. A standard battalion generally flew 3,000-4,000 hours per year, while the 5th Battalion had nearly 12,000 accident-free flying hours during 1999. The unit was also the primary organization used for transporting the US Vice President and entourage for the president when they were in the theater. In 1999, the 5th Battalion deployed to Albania, Macedonia, Kosovo, Bosnia, Africa, Hungary, Austria, Switzerland and other areas within Europe. The total flying hours for FY99 was over 11,000, with over 5,000 of those hours logged in support of Task Force Hawk in Albania. Vehicle miles covered by members of the battalion were over 135,000. The unit also dispensed over 750,000 gallons of aircraft fuel without a major incident. Soldiers of the 5th Battalion were the first to fly US troops into Kosovo. 5th Battalion cased its colors at Katterbach Kaserne in June, 2015 in accordance with the Aviation Restructuring Initiative.

== 6th Battalion, 158th Aviation Regiment ==
In October 1987, under an army-wide restructuring, Company B of the 6th Battalion was activated by reflagging the existing 295th Aviation Company within the 12th Aviation Group (concurrently redesignated as the 12th Aviation Brigade) at Wiesbaden AB, Germany.

== 7th Battalion, 158th Aviation Regiment ==
The 7th General Support Aviation Battalion was constituted on 16 September 1987 with headquarters in the Army Reserve as the 7th Battalion, 158th Aviation and activated on 16 September 1988 at Scott Air Force Base, Illinois. There it was ordered into active military service 27 December 1990, deployed to serve in Operations Desert Shield and Desert Storm, and later released on 17 June 1991, reverting to reserve status. Except for C Company, 7th Battalion, 158th Aviation Regiment, which remained on active duty attached to 5th Battalion, 158th Aviation Regiment 12th Aviation Brigade stationed in Giebelstadt AAF Germany, supporting Operation Beirut Air Bridge. On 1 September 1995 the unit was inactivated at Scott AFB. The lineage was resurrected on 16 October 1999 when it was reactivated at Fort Hood, Texas, and on 1 October 2005 the unit was redesignated as the 7th Battalion, 158th Aviation Regiment. Elements ordered into active military service from 15 January 2005 to 11 October 2006 at home stations, then released from active military service from 12 February 2006 to 7 April 2008, reverting to reserve status. Company A ordered into active military service on 10 November 2008 at Victorville, California, then released and reverting to reserve status on 14 December 2009. Company C and other elements were ordered into active federal service on 29 January 2009 at Salem, Oregon, then released and reverting to state control on 4 March 2010. Elements ordered into active military service on 24 January 2010 at home stations and then released and reverting to reserve status on 11 March 2010. On 17 March 2011 elements were again ordered into active military service, this time at New Century, Kansas.
