= Experimental Military Unit =

Australian-American military unit

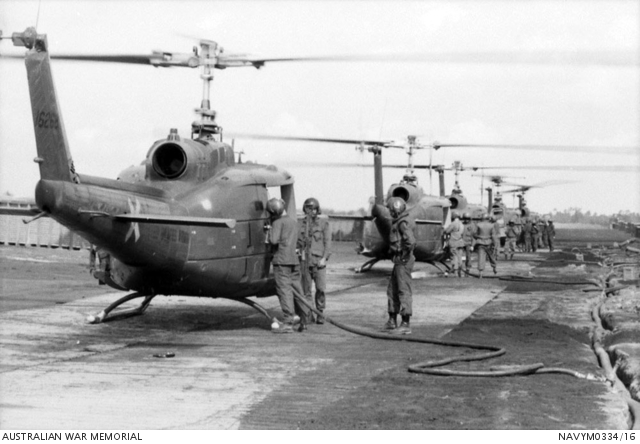
- EMU UH-1s refuel while supporting ARVN 7th Division operations
- Active: 1967–1971
- Country: United States/Australia
- Branch: United States Army/Royal Australian Navy
- Role: Helicopter assault and transport
- Size: Company
- Nickname: The Emus
- Motto: "Get the Bloody Job Done"

The Experimental Military Unit (EMU) was a joint Australian-American company-sized helicopter assault force which operated during the Vietnam War. The unit was created in 1967 following a request from the United States military for Australia to send more helicopter pilots to the conflict. As the only available personnel were from the Royal Australian Navy (RAN) Fleet Air Arm (with Australian Army and RAAF pilots already heavily committed), the RAN Helicopter Flight Vietnam (RANHFV) was formed and integrated into the 135th Assault Helicopter Company of the United States Army. The EMU unit name was selected by the Americans as a backronym for the Australian bird, a choice which amused the Australians: despite being large, fast, and highly mobile, the emu cannot fly.

The EMU flew multiple variants of the UH-1 Iroquois helicopter, and was primarily tasked with providing transport and support for units of the Army of the Republic of Vietnam (ARVN), United States Army and Marine Corps, and Australian Army. A typical day's operations consisted of ten transports (supported by four gunships and a command unit) collecting a unit of soldiers, performing a combat assault, then returning the unit to base. Other operations included dawn and dusk assaults, night hunter-killer patrols, and supporting United States Navy SEAL units in the capture of senior Viet Cong personnel. Although the RAN contingent was significantly smaller than the rest of the unit, the Australian personnel frequently found themselves in senior positions, due to having more extensive training and experience than their American counterparts.

Initially operating out of Vung Tau Air Base, the EMU was relocated to Blackhorse Base Camp at the end of 1967. In late 1968, the unit was moved to near Biên Hòa. In mid-1970, the EMU was tasked to operations into Cambodia, but as the rules of engagement for the Australians forbade them from operating outside Vietnam, the unit operated under-strength for several days until being retasked back to Vietnam operations. Later that year, the unit was relocated to Đồng Tâm. The RANHFV was withdrawn from Vietnam in 1971, ending the joint unit. The Australian contingent was the most highly decorated RAN unit to serve in the Vietnam War, and the one with the highest casualty rate.

== Organisation and role ==
The EMU was formed around the US Army's 135th Assault Helicopter Company. The 135th had previously flown Caribou transports as a tactical air transport company, but was reoriented for helicopters following the Johnson-McConnell agreement of 1966, when all fixed-wing aircraft were transferred to the United States Air Force and all rotary-wing aircraft to the United States Army.

The 135th was integrated with the Royal Australian Navy Helicopter Flight Vietnam, an Australian contingent of eight pilots, four observers, four aircrew, 24 technical sailors and mechanics, and six administrative personnel, all drawn from 723 Squadron RAN. Four of these contingents were deployed during the Australian participation in the joint unit (RANHFV 1 through 4). The Australian officer in charge of the RAN contingent became the executive officer of the 135th Company, and because of their more extensive training and experience when compared to the American personnel (for example, one US Army flying instructor assigned to the company had only 125 hours flying experience, while each RAN pilot had over 1,000 hours), Australian personnel commonly filled out leadership positions throughout the company.

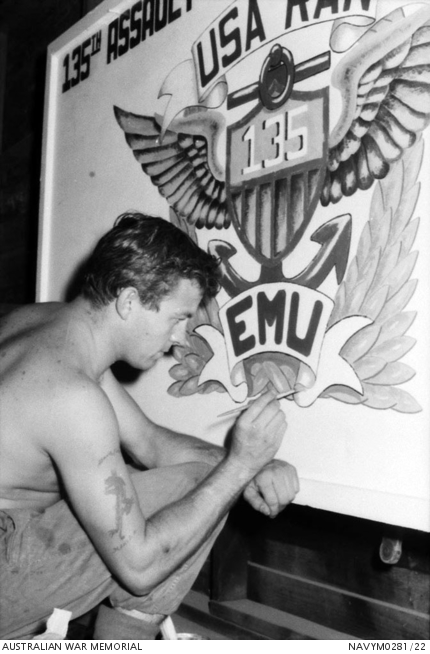
RANHFV airman paints EMU logo

The collective name for the combined unit was the Experimental Military Unit, or EMU. The name was a backronym for emu, and was selected by the 135th before their deployment for being a large, fast, and highly mobile Australian bird. The designation amused Australian members of the company, because emus cannot fly.

The EMU was officially part of 12th Aviation Group, 1st Aviation Brigade, and was part of the US Army chain of command. A separate chain of command for RAN personnel was maintained to the Commander Australian Forces Vietnam. The Australian command chain was rarely used: David Farthing, who led RANHFV 3, claims he only had to use it once during his twelve-month deployment.

The main role of the EMU was to provide transport and support for units of the Army of the Republic of Vietnam (ARVN), United States Army and Marine Corps, and Australian Army. For this purpose, the company was equipped with UH-1 Iroquois helicopters: 30 UH-1D or UH-1H 'Slick' troop-carrying helicopters (the EMU was the first Assault Helicopter Company to be equipped with the 'H' model), and eight UH-1C gunship helicopters (nicknamed Taipans, after the venomous Australian snake). The company was divided up into five platoons: two troop transport, one gunship, one maintenance, and one headquarters.

A typical daily deployment consisted of ten Slicks (plus a spare), two teams of two gunships, and a Command and Control helicopter (designated 'Charley Charley'). The helicopters would depart base at dawn, collect a unit (typically from the United States 9th Infantry Division, the United States 199th Infantry Brigade, the South Vietnamese III and IV Corps, or the 1st Australian Task Force), perform a combat assault, then return the unit to their base before dark. Other duties performed by the EMU, particularly from 1970 onwards, included dawn and dusk assaults; night hunter-killer patrols, which consisted of one Slick armed with flares, two gunships, and a Charley Charley armed with a high-power searchlight and a twin 0.50 calibre machinegun; and joint operations with the United States Navy SEALs, which typically involved locating and capturing senior Viet Cong (VC) personnel.

== History ==
=== Creation ===
In 1966, the United States requested that Australia send more helicopter pilots to Vietnam, as the increase in the number of US and allied soldiers had increased beyond the capability of helicopter transport and support units. Because of Australian Army and Royal Australian Air Force (RAAF) commitments in Vietnam and elsewhere, the only available pilots were from the RAN Fleet Air Arm. It was originally intended to integrate them with the RAAF's No. 9 Squadron, although the United States Army requested that the RAN pilots be integrated with one of their helicopter companies. On 14 July 1967, it was announced that the RAN Helicopter Flight Vietnam (RANHFV) would be created and combined with the US Army's 135th Assault Helicopter Company to form the Experimental Military Unit (EMU).

=== October 1967 – September 1968 ===
The components of the EMU arrived in Vung Tau during early October 1967: the 135th during the first week, and the RANHFV contingent during 16–18 October. The company was declared operational on 3 November 1967. The company operated from Vung Tau Air Base during November and December, then was relocated to Blackhorse Base Camp (operating base of the 11th Armored Cavalry Regiment) in the Xuân Lộc district on 31 December.

In mid-February, while delivering the ARVN 9th Division to a landing zone near Mỹ Tho, the EMU encountered multiple companies of heavily armed North Vietnamese People's Army of Vietnam (PAVN) soldiers. One helicopter was shot down by a rocket, killing the American aircrew, and eight other aircraft were damaged. On 22 February 1968, a RAN EMU pilot was killed while leading a mission to extract ARVN soldiers from a VC assault. He was the first Australian pilot to be killed in the Vietnam War.

A program started in late February, where pilots from No. 9 Squadron RAAF were invited to fly with the EMU for two-week stints: although officially conceived to promote knowledge-sharing between the Royal Australian Navy, Royal Australian Air Force and the United States Army aviation branch, the plan also helped counteract pilot shortages in the EMU as United States personnel completed their twelve-month draft period and were not immediately replaced.

On 18 May, the EMU was assigned to transport the ARVN 25th Division. During the landing, the force was ambushed by VC: ten aircraft were hit and several ARVN were killed or wounded, although the only injury suffered by EMU aircrew was a bullet through the earlobe of an American pilot. It was later found that the attack resulted from an intelligence leak within the ARVN unit, resulting in a tightening of procedures and the creation of 'Smoky'; an Iroquois modified to generate a smoke screen during landings.

On 21 August, a gunship was struck by a rocket and crashed, killing the three aircrew.

Starting from 9 September, the second RANHFV contingent was rotated in, with the EMU's Australian Executive Officer relieved on 30 September, and the last members of the first contingent departing on 15 October. During RANHFV 1's deployment, the EMU had flown 30,670 hours, with seven American and three Australian aircrew killed, plus eleven Americans and four Australians seriously injured.

=== October 1968 – September 1969 ===
On 23 October, the EMU met heavy resistance near Bến Tre while performing insertions and extractions of the 9th Division. Two helicopters crashed and were destroyed, and another seven damaged, but there were no aircrew casualties.

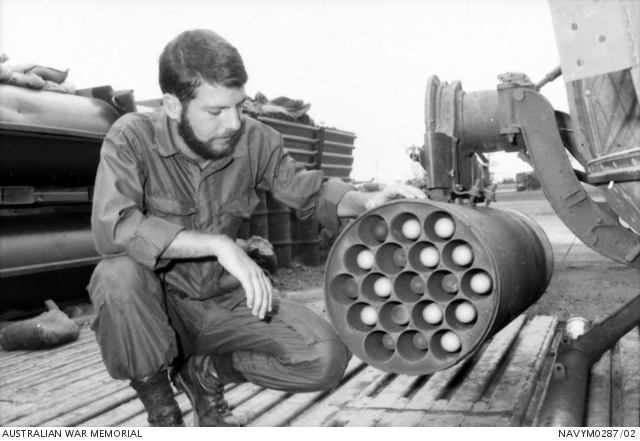
RANHFV pilot checks rocket pod on his UH-1 at Bearcat Base, March 1969

From November, the EMU was assigned to operate from Bearcat Base (operating base of the 222nd Aviation Battalion) near Biên Hòa, at the same time as their duties expanded to include supporting Royal Thai Army forces.

In January 1969, a RAN pilot was killed when his helicopter made contact with power lines during bad weather.

In mid-February, a gunship was shot down in Vĩnh Long by a VC force. The aircrew survived, and used the gunship's door-mounted M60 machine guns to keep the VC at bay until another EMU helicopter could rescue them. The VC commenced sporadic mortar attacks on Bearcat on 22 February, forcing the EMU to evacuate their helicopters and support personnel to Blackhorse six times over the next seven days.

On 31 May, an EMU gunship escorting a formation near Đồng Tâm Base Camp came under heavy fire and crashed, killing all aboard. Door Gunner, Leading Aircrewman Noel Shipp, the only Australian in the crew, continued to fire as the helicopter hit the ground, a campaign to bestow Shipp with the Victoria Cross failed and he was instead honored with a Recruit Division in his name at the RAN, Recruit School.

On 16 June, an Australian gunner aboard a Slick was wounded while providing covering fire for a medical evacuation of South Vietnamese soldiers near Cái Bè.

Despite the start of the wet season in June, PAVN activity increased. This, combined with the loss of several helicopters and the replacement of the US 9th Infantry Division with the less professional ARVN 7th and 9th Divisions as part of the 'Vietnamization' process, increased the EMU's workload.

RANHFV 3 began to rotate in from 10 September, and was completed by late September.

=== October 1969 – September 1970 ===
On 19 December, following a VC ambush in Bình Đại which killed half of an ARVN unit, the EMU successfully deployed a blocking force in the path of the PAVN withdrawal, which inflicted heavy casualties.

Several helicopters were shot down and crew chiefs killed or wounded during operations in the first months of 1970. Around the same time, the replacement of South Vietnamese commanders with more aggressive officers in the units the EMU operated with, a desire to prevent North Vietnam from launching another Tet Offensive-like attack, and the commencement of night-time hunter-killer patrols dramatically increased the EMU's workload. This was compounded by shortages in new American personnel to replace those who had completed their draft, spare parts, and aircraft, forcing the EMU to borrow helicopters and aircrew from other units.

In early March, an EMU helicopter landed on a booby trap, seriously wounding the Australian pilot and killing two South Vietnamese passengers. Later that month, an American gunship crewman died from wounds received from enemy fire, while in a separate incident, five Slicks were damaged by gunfire.

At the start of May 1970, the EMU was marked to lead operations into Cambodia. However, as Australian personnel were forbidden by their rules of engagement from entering Cambodia, a point reinforced by the Australian Embassy the night before the first operation, the EMU was forced to operate without Australian personnel for several days, until they were reassigned to duties in Vietnam. The commitment of other helicopter units to the Cambodian campaign further increased the EMU workload.

On 18 May, a South Vietnamese outpost was overrun by a VC battalion. The Dutchmaster's (air cav) lead pilot WO ALBERT CROUCH was shot and killed. EMU was then called in to drop counterattacking troops into the area; during this the Australian-crewed lead helicopter was damaged and had to withdraw. Another EMU helicopter was diverted from other operations to lead the insertions. Sblt PERRY was the 3rd lead pilot and received cockpit instrument damage from enemy fire on his first insertion, although the Australian pilot remained on station for several more waves. SBLT Perry's brand new helicopter was damaged to point that it never flew again The pilot, Sub-Lieutenant Andy Perry, was later awarded the United States Silver Star, the South Vietnamese Cross of Gallantry, and was mentioned in despatches. Two days later, an EMU gunship crashed after being fired on by a .50 caliber machine gun, killing the American aircrew, while its companion was heavily damaged.

By the end of May, the shortage of United States personnel had been addressed, with the company brought back to full strength. However, the gunship platoon was down several helicopters, a situation that remained unaddressed as the UH-1C gunship was no longer in production, and the replacement, the AH-1 Cobra, had not been deployed to frontline units.

In August, the EMU was relocated to Đồng Tâm Base Camp, which also housed elements of the United States Navy SEALs and the Mobile Riverine Force. Although closer to the unit's normal operating areas (an advantage which was negated when the ARVN 21st Division, operating in the Mekong Delta began to require EMU support), the base was regularly subjected to mortar and rocket attacks (in the first month, the base was mortared on average once a week). The EMU was required to relocate completely within four days while continuing operations.

The Royal Australian Navy rotation from RANHFV 3 to RANHFV 4 occurred during September, with the EMU executive officer position formally handed over on 17 September.

=== October 1970 – June 1971 ===
Attacks on the base continued throughout October and November; five EMU personnel were wounded by mortar shrapnel on 3 November. On 11 November, the EMU was required to drop four waves of South Vietnamese soldiers into an engagement with a VC battalion near the U Minh Forest. During this, five aircraft were damaged, one of which was forced to land, but later recovered.

The vulnerability of the UH-1 was demonstrated in late 1970, when five EMU helicopters were shot down in the Kien Hoa province by a single VC soldier armed with an AK-47 rifle. Nobody was killed in the resulting crashes, but all five helicopters had to be airlifted out by CH-47 Chinooks.

On 4 December, an Australian EMU pilot rescued a South Vietnamese patrol boat, which had been disabled and was drifting towards the VC force that had attacked it and sunk a companion craft. Despite coming under fire, the pilot achieved this by entangling his Iroquois' landing skids in the boat's superstructure and towing it away. He was later awarded the Distinguished Flying Cross for his actions.

Operations continued into the new year, and on 16 January 1971 an EMU helicopter was shot down, crashing upside-down. The American pilot was killed, but the other personnel survived the crash, linked up with South Vietnamese troops fighting in the area, and remained with them until helicopters of the 1st Cavalry Regiment drove the PAVN off.

During late February and early March, South Vietnamese and American forces were involved in Operation Lam Son 719, an attempt to cut North Vietnamese supply lines (known as the Ho Chi Minh trail in Laos. Because of the Australian contingent, the EMU did not participate in this operation, but found that American pilots and aircrew intended for the unit to replace draft completers were instead being diverted to helicopter companies supporting the operation.

Early in 1971, it was announced that the RANHFV would be one of several Australian units to withdraw from Vietnam by mid-1971. The Australian personnel of the EMU ceased flying operations on 8 June, and departed on 16 June, marking the end of the joint-force Experimental Military Unit.

== Awards and honours ==
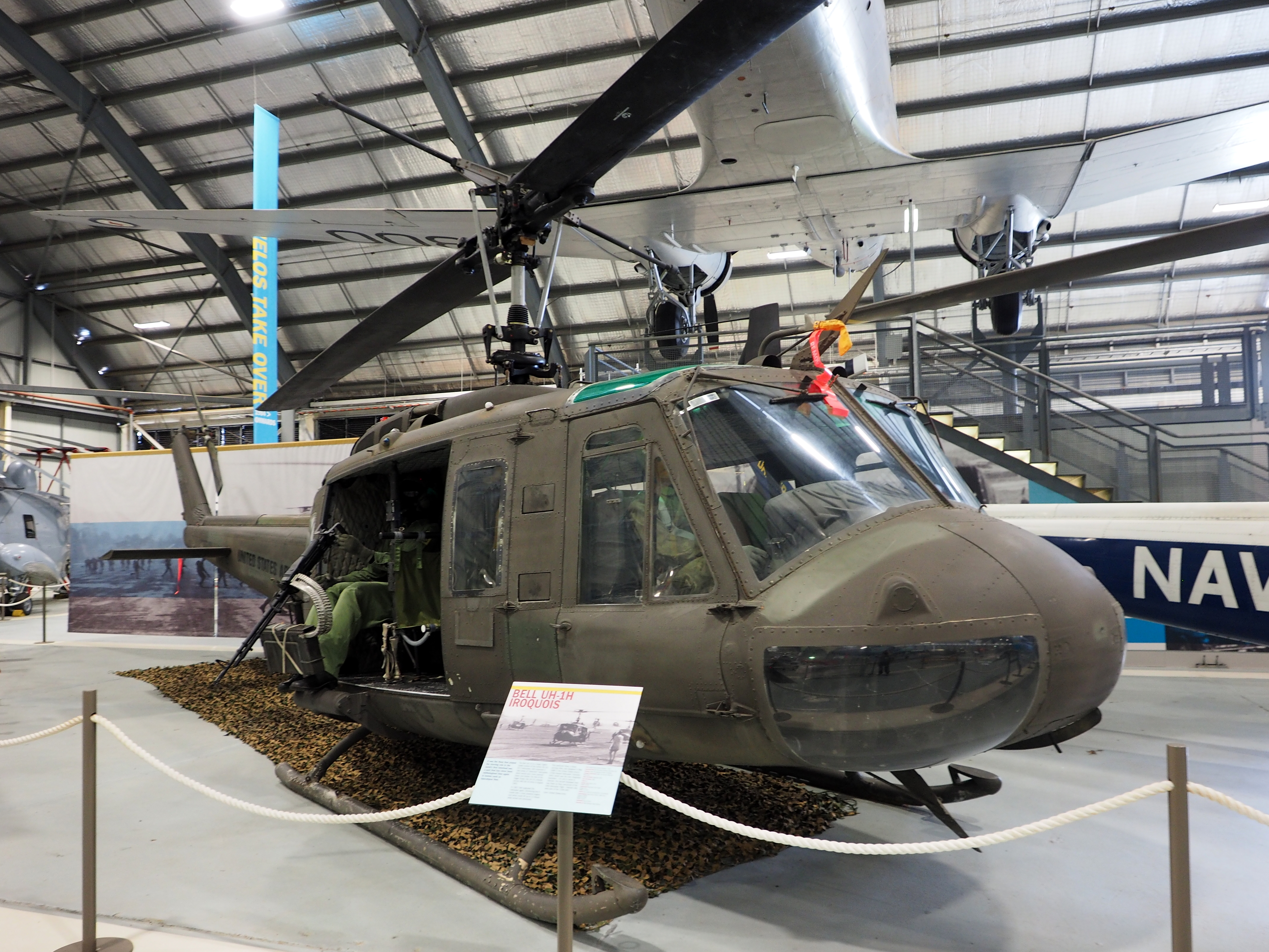
A UH-1N helicopter that was flown by Royal Australian Navy Helicopter Flight Vietnam personnel in 1968, on display at the Fleet Air Arm Museum in 2015

The Australian personnel received a number of honours and decorations: three were appointed Member of the Order of the British Empire (MBE), eight received the Distinguished Service Cross (DSC), five the Distinguished Flying Cross (DFC), and one received the British Empire Medal (BEM). 24 were Mentioned in Despatches, and 34 received Naval Board Commendations. This was over half of the honours and awards presented to RAN personnel serving in the Vietnam War. Australian personnel were also awarded several Vietnamese and United States decorations.

723 Squadron RAN, the parent unit of the RAN Helicopter Flight Vietnam, was awarded the battle honour "Vietnam 1967–71".

Five RAN personnel assigned to the EMU were killed during the conflict, with another ten seriously injured: the highest casualty rate of any RAN unit in Vietnam.

In 2018, the Australian government awarded the Helicopter Flight Vietnam a Unit Citation for Gallantry, which was presented at a ceremony held at the Australian War Memorial in Canberra.
