= 214th Aviation Regiment =

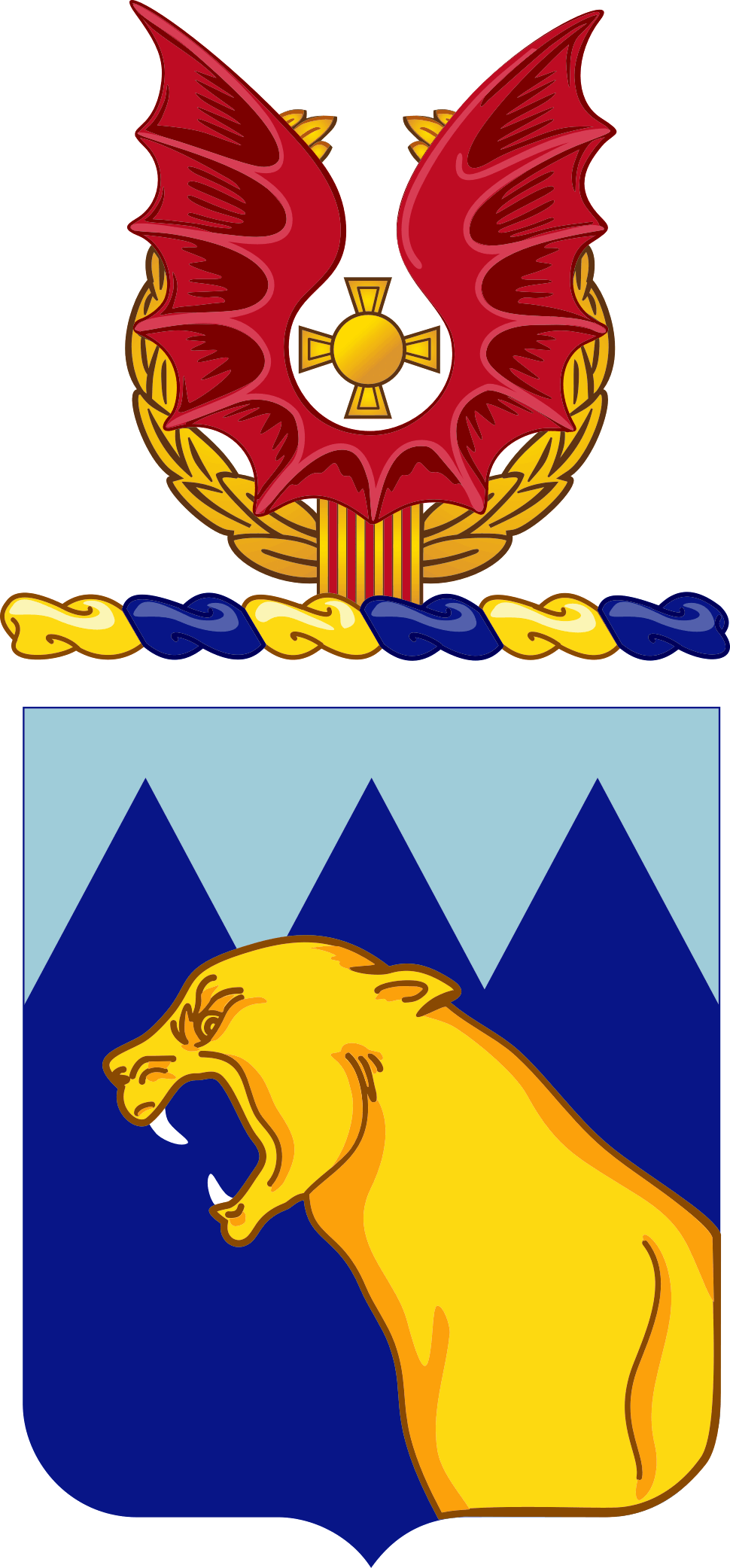
- Coat of Arms
- Active: 1967–1973; 1981–1986; 1987–1996 (1st Battalion); 1998–2000 (Company A); 2000–present (1st Battalion)
- Country: United States
- Branch: United States Army Aviation Branch
- Type: Aviation (parent regiment from 1987)
- Part of: 12th Combat Aviation Brigade (1st Battalion)
- Garrison/HQ: Lucius D. Clay Kaserne (1st Battalion)
- Engagements: Vietnam War; Gulf War

Insignia
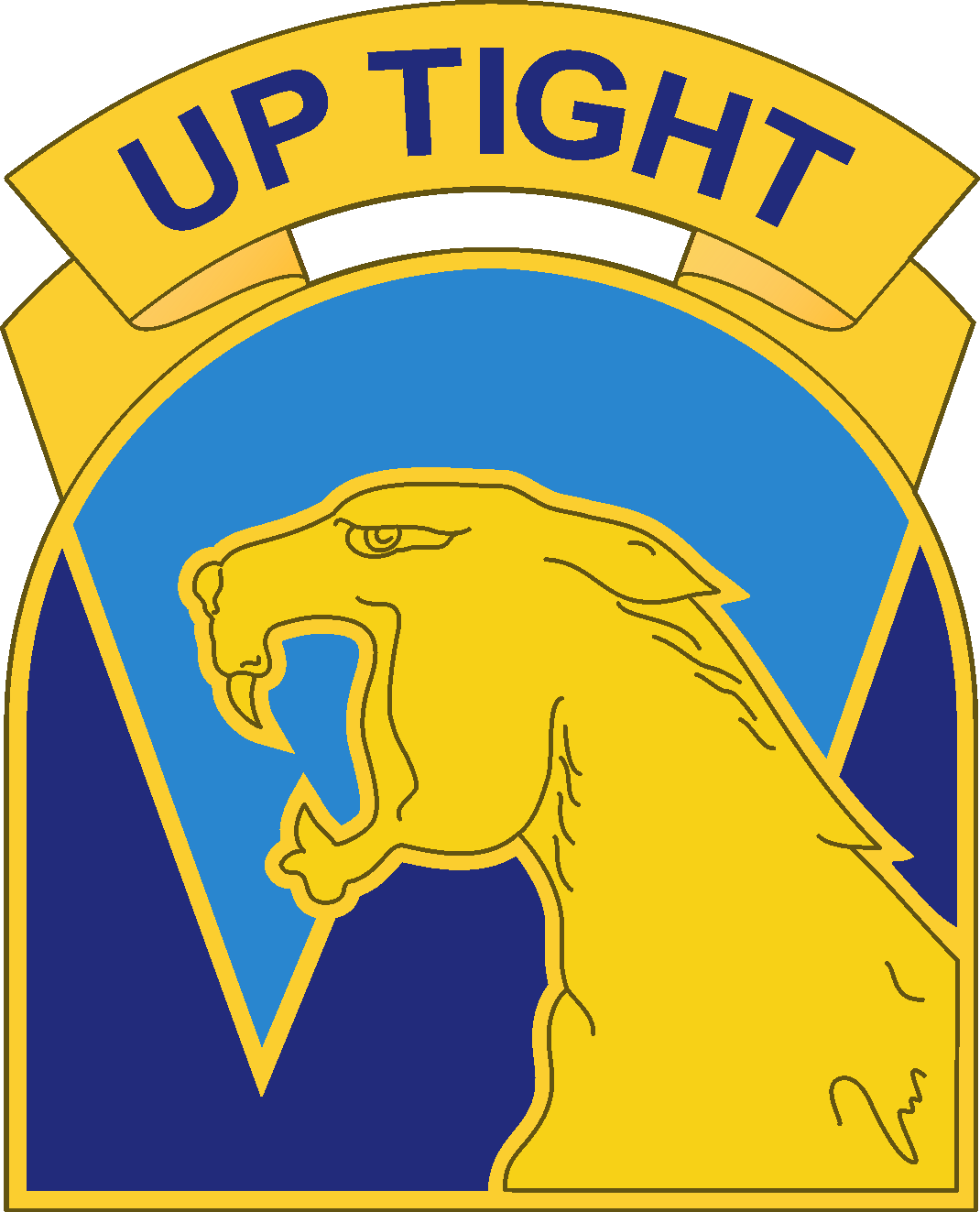
- Distinctive Unit Insignia

Aircraft flown
- Utility helicopter: UH-60M Black Hawk

The 214th Aviation Regiment is a parent aviation regiment of the United States Army, represented by the 1st Battalion, 214th Aviation, part of the 12th Combat Aviation Brigade, United States Army Europe (USAREUR) at Lucius D. Clay Kaserne, Wiesbaden.

== History ==
=== Vietnam ===
The regiment was constituted on 1 February 1967 as the 214th Aviation Battalion, a Regular Army unit based at Fort Campbell, Kentucky. It fought in the Vietnam War from 1967 to 1972, receiving the Meritorious Unit Commendation for its actions in 1967 and the Republic of Vietnam Gallantry Cross with Palm five times, in addition to the Republic of Vietnam Civil Action Honor Medal.

As part of the 12th Aviation Group (Combat) between 1 February 1967 and 30 April 1967:

- HQ & HQ Detachment at Bear Cat
- 200th Assault Support Helicopter Company at Bear Cat
  - 611th Transportation Detachment at Bear Cat

As part of the 12th Aviation Group (Combat) between 1 May 1967 and 31 July 1967:

- 190th Assault Helicopter Company at Bear Cat
- 191st Assault Helicopter Company at Bear Cat
- 200th Assault Support Helicopter Company at Bear Cat
- 240th Assault Helicopter Company at Bear Cat

As part of the 12th Aviation Group (Combat) between 1 August 1967 and 31 October 1967:

- HQ & HQ Company at Bear Cat
- 772nd Medical Detachment (OA) at Bear Cat
- 17th Assault Helicopter Company at Long Binh
  - 613th Transportation Detachment (KD) at Long Binh
  - 722nd Signal Detachment (RL) at Long Binh
  - 93rd Medical Detachment (AO) at Long Binh
- 191st Assault Helicopter Company at Bear Cat
  - 606th Transportation Detachment (KD) at Bear Cat
  - 26th Signal Detachment (RL) at Bear Cat
- 195th Assault Helicopter Company at Long Binh
  - 609th Transportation Detachment (KD) at Long Binh
  - 366th Signal Detachment (RL) at Long Binh
- 200th Assault Helicopter Company at Bear Cat
  - 611th Transportation Detachment (AB) at Bear Cat
- 240th Assault Helicopter Company at Bear Cat
  - 619th Transportation Detachment (KD) at Bear Cat
  - 932nd Signal Detachment (RL) at Bear Cat

As part of the 12th Aviation Group (Combat) between 1 November 1967 and 31 January 1968:

- HQ & HQ Company at Bear Cat
- 772nd Medical Detachment (OA) at Bear Cat
- 17th Assault Helicopter Company at Long Binh
  - 613th Transportation Detachment (KD) at Long Binh
  - 722nd Signal Detachment (RL) at Long Binh
  - 93rd Medical Detachment (OA) at Long Binh
- 135th Assault Helicopter Company at Long Giao
  - 614th Transportation Detachment (KD) at Long Giao
  - 68th Signal Detachment (RL) at Long Giao

Between May and July 1969 the battalion consisted of:

- 758th Medical Detachment
- 162nd Assault Helicopter Company
- 135th Assault Helicopter Company
- 191st Assault Helicopter Company

Before being transferred to 164th Aviation Group (Combat).

Inactivated on 22 January 1973 at Fort Stewart, Georgia, the battalion was again activated on 1 July 1981 at Fort Lewis, Washington, with the 9th Infantry Division. It was again inactivated at Fort Polk, Louisiana, on 15 September 1986.

=== Cold War onwards ===
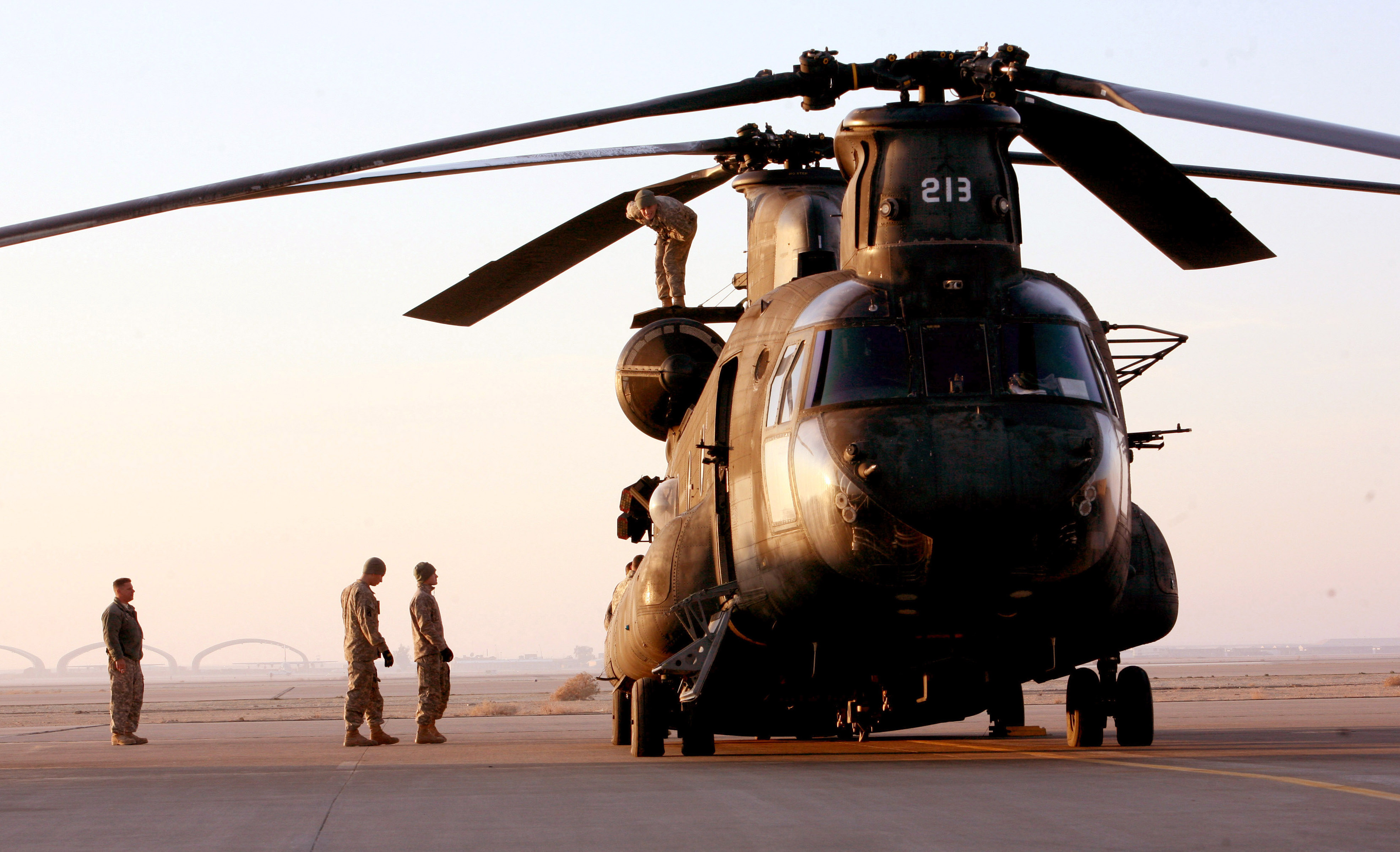
Soldiers of Company B, 1st Battalion, 214th Aviation examining their CH-47 before turning it over to another unit in Iraq

When the United States Army Regimental System was established, it was relieved from its assignment to the 9th Division on 16 August 1987 and became a parent regiment. One of its battalions was the 1st Battalion, which was allotted to the United States Army Reserve and activated at Los Alamitos, California on that date; it traced its lineage back to the 1981 activation of Company A, 214th Aviation Battalion. A battalion of the regiment fought in the Liberation of Kuwait campaign during the Gulf War. The 1st Battalion was inactivated at Los Alamitos on 15 September 1996, and became Company A, 214th Aviation while the rest of the 1st Battalion was disbanded on 16 September 1998, being simultaneously transferred to the Regular Army and activated in Germany. The company was reorganized as a battalion on 16 October 2000.

In March 2013, USAREUR announced that 1-214th Aviation was to be reduced at Clay Kaserne by 190 soldier spaces and at Landstuhl Regional Medical Center by 50 soldier spaces in 2016.

The 1st Battalion donated two new Sikorsky UH-60M Black Hawks to the Croatian Air Force and Air Defence in October 2017.

== Structure ==
- 1st Battalion (General Support)
  - Company A "Aces"(UH-60V) Wiesbaden Army Airfield
  - Company B "Big Windy" (CH-47F) Katterbach Army Airfield
  - Company C "DUSTOFF" (HH-60M) Grafenwoehr Army Airfield
  - Company D "Desperados" (ASC) Wiesbaden Army Airfield
    - Company D Detachment "Dead Rabbits" (ASC) Katterbach Army Airfield
  - Company E "Barons" (C-12, UC-35) Wiesbaden Army Airfield
