= 12th Combat Aviation Brigade =

Combat Aviation Brigade of the United States Army

12th Aviation Brigade
- 12th Combat Aviation Brigade shoulder sleeve insignia
- Active: 1965–present
- Country: United States
- Allegiance: U.S. Army Europe and Africa
- Branch: United States Army
- Role: Aviation
- Size: Brigade
- Part of: V Corps
- Garrison/HQ: Katterbach Kaserne, Germany
- Nickname: Griffins
- Motto: 'Wings of Victory!'
- Colors: Ultramarine Blue and Golden Orange
- Website: Official Website

Commanders
- Current commander: Colonel Adam Bock
- Command Sergeant Major & Command Chief Warrant Officer: CSM Njikoka Anderson & CW5 Jonathan Hulse
- Notable commanders: Timothy J. Edens

Insignia
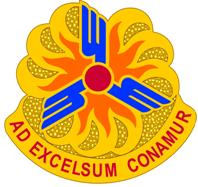
- Distinctive unit insignia

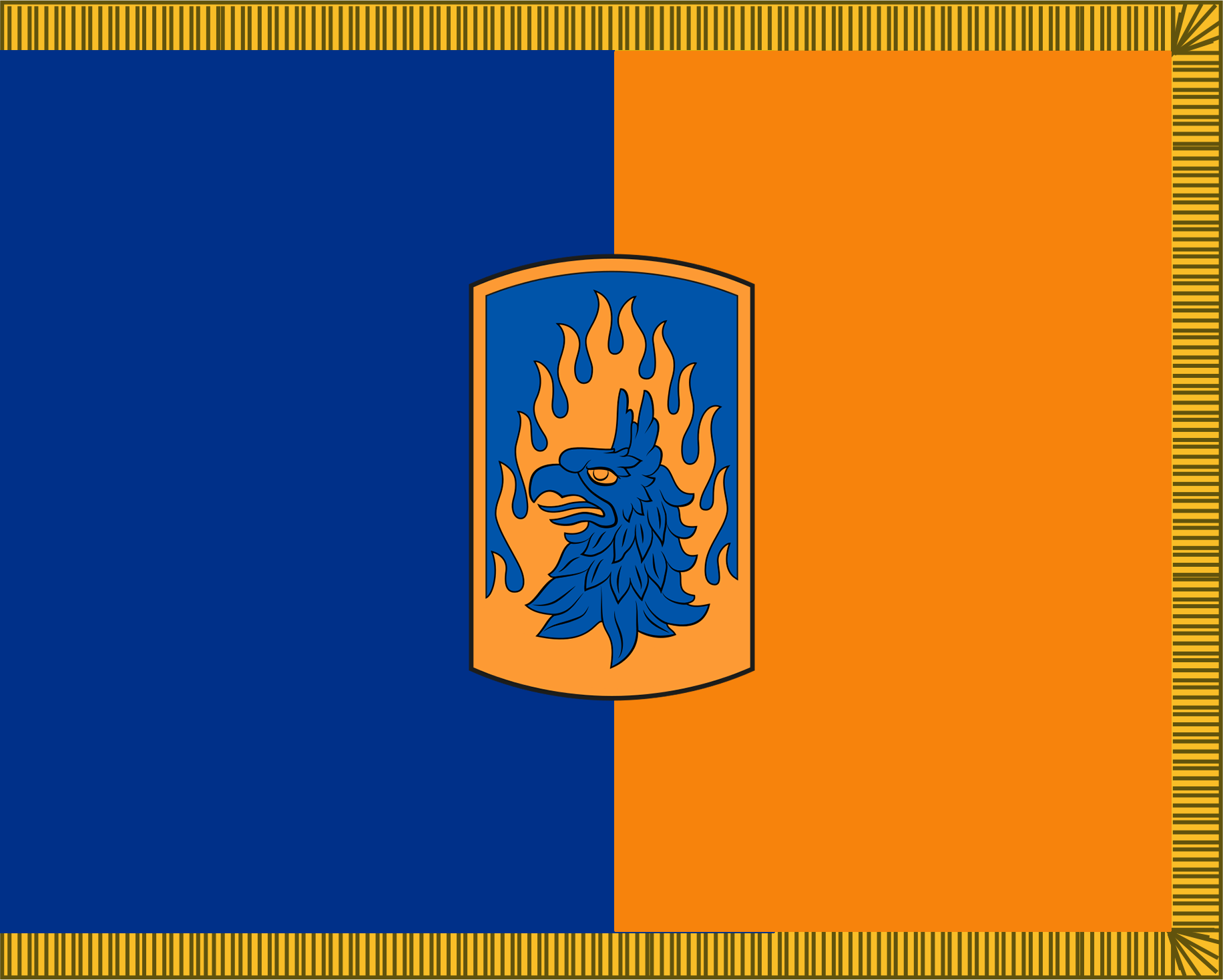
- 12th Combat Aviation Brigade Flag

The 12th Combat Aviation Brigade is a Combat Aviation Brigade of the United States Army. It was first organized as the 12th Aviation Group at Fort Benning, Georgia, on 18 June 1965.

== Vietnam ==
Initially, "USARV formed an "Aviation Group (Provisional)" in April 1965 which controlled the 13th, 14th, 52nd, and 145th Aviation Battalions & the 765th Transportation Battalion." It appears that this provisional aviation group formed the basis, already in Vietnam, of the future 12th Aviation Group.

The group was activated at Fort Benning, Georgia, on 18 June 1965.

It deployed to Vietnam in August 1965 to command non-organic Army aviation units, and by November 1965, the group consisted of 11,000 personnel and 34 aviation units. Between 1965 and 1966 the group doubled in size and was used to form the 1st Aviation Brigade in March 1966.

Among its units in Vietnam were the:

- 17th, 57th, and 61st Aviation Companies flying the de Havilland Canada CV-2 Caribou transport aircraft before the Caribous were transferred to the United States Air Force on 1 January 1967.
- 11th Aviation Battalion
  - HQ at Phu Loi sometime between 1 May 1966 and 30 April 1970
- 13th Aviation Battalion
  - HQ at Can Tho sometime between 1 May 66 and 31 Jul 66
- 145th Aviation Battalion
  - HQ at Bien Hoa sometime between 1 May 66 and 30 Apr 70
- 210th Aviation Battalion
  - HQ at Long Thanh sometime between 15 January 1968 and 30 Apr 70
- 214th Aviation Battalion
  - HQ at Bear Cat sometime between 1 Feb 67 and 30 Apr 68
- 222nd Aviation Battalion
  - HQ at Vung Tau sometime between 1 May 66 and 30 Apr 68
  - HQ at Bear Cat sometime between 1 Feb 70 and 30 Apr 70
- 269th Aviation Battalion
  - HQ at Cu Chi sometime between January 1966 and 30 Apr 70
- 308th Aviation Battalion
  - HQ at Bien Hoa sometime between 20 December 1967 and 31 Jan 68
- Buffalo Combat Aviation Battalion (Provisional) sometime between 15 Jan 67 and 31 Jan 67

Assigned to the Military Region III in Vietnam, the 12th Group was the largest unit of its type to serve in combat. Its colors, emblazoned with 18 campaign streamers, give lasting testimony to its role. The unit earned the Meritorious Unit Commendation, two Vietnamese Crosses for Gallantry with Palm, and the Vietnamese Civic Action Medal, First Class while in Vietnam.

== Cold War ==
Upon its return in March 1973, the 12th Aviation Group became a major subordinate command of the XVIII Airborne Corps, Fort Bragg, North Carolina. In November 1979, the 12th Aviation Group deployed to Lindsey Air Station, Wiesbaden, Germany as a major subordinate command of the V Corps, providing command and control of aviation units throughout the V Corps area of operation. In April 1984, Headquarters Company, 12th Aviation Group moved to Wiesbaden Air Base. In October 1987, under army-wide restructuring, the 12th Aviation Group was re-designated as the 12th Aviation Brigade, along with its subordinate units: 5th Battalion, 158th Aviation Regiment; C Company, 7th Battalion, 158th Aviation Regiment; and B Company, 6th Battalion, 158th Aviation Regiment. In the latter part of 1988, the Brigade re-structured again when the 5th Squadron (AH 64), 6th Cavalry Regiment arrived in Europe.

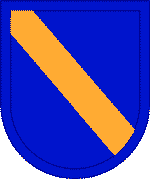

During the Cold War years the 12th had a 12-man pathfinder platoon assigned to the group headquarters. The authorization for the pathfinder unit was deleted around the time the group was redesignated a brigade and the pathfinders departed as their tours ended. Their beret flash and parachute wing trimming can be seen on the Institute of Heraldry website.

== Middle East ==
In August 1990, the brigade deployed to Southwest Asia for Operations Desert Shield and Desert Storm with 2–3 Aviation Regiment (Attack) attached. During Desert Storm the brigade provided a highly mobile and lethal maneuver force to the multi-national forces in Saudi Arabia. Initially attached to the 101st Airborne Division (Air Assault), the brigade became a major subordinate command of XVIII Airborne Corps in January 1991. During the four-day coalition ground offensive, the brigade flew nearly 400 flight hours, transporting 390 tons of cargo to forward deployed units and providing essential combat and combat support services for the ground offensive.

== Post-Cold War ==
On 15 June 1992, the 5th Squadron, 6th Cavalry Regiment was de-activated as part of the downsizing of U.S. Army Europe (USAREUR). The 3rd Battalion, 58th Aviation Regiment (Air Traffic Services) joined the Brigade on 16 June 1992.

Since the end of the Cold War, the brigade has played a major role in America's peacekeeping operations. From 1991 until 1996, 12th Brigade ensured the safety of Kurdish citizens during Operation Provide Comfort. The brigade operated the Beirut Air Bridge from 1993 until 1998, providing a logistical lifeline to the US Embassy in Beirut from Cyprus. The brigade also deployed soldiers to Hungary and Bosnia in 1995 to enforce the peace during Operations Joint Endeavor and Joint Guard.

In April 1999, the brigade deployed to Tirana, Albania as part of Task Force Hawk in support of NATO Operation Allied Force. The Brigade Task Force consisted of 65 aircraft including UH-60 Black Hawks, CH-47 Chinooks, AH-64 Apaches, and UH-60 MEDEVAC aircraft. When peace was declared in June 1999, the brigade transported elements of the 82nd Airborne Division into Macedonia and Kosovo, moving 390 personnel, 24 vehicles, and 13 pallets of equipment in less than 48 hours of the signing of the Military Technical Agreement. The brigade flew in excess of 6,000 hours and conducted 22,185 aircraft movements in support of operations in Albania, Macedonia, and Kosovo, with CH-47 and Air Traffic Control elements supporting Task Force Falcon until March 2001 and June 2000, respectively. After returning from Task Force Hawk and Task Force Falcon, 12th Brigade prepared for re-structuring and re-stationing initiatives. USAREUR Movement Directive 5-00 directed all of the Aviation Brigade elements stationed at Wiesbaden Army Airfield to move to Giebelstadt Army Airfield. On 30 June 2000, 5th Battalion, 158th Aviation Regiment, the largest aviation battalion in theater consisting of 840 soldiers, split into two separate battalions, 3-158 Aviation Regiment and 5-158 Aviation Regiment. On 31 August 2000, all units from Wiesbaden closed on Giebelstadt Army Airfield.

== Afghanistan and Iraq ==
The 12th Aviation Brigade fought for a year during its deployment to the Iraq War. The brigade flew thousands of hours, moved over 25,000 personnel, and controlled over 230,000 air movements. In February 2005 the 12th Aviation Brigade deployed to Afghanistan in support Operation Enduring Freedom and to Pakistan in support of International Earthquake Humanitarian Relief Operations. While in support of Operation Enduring Freedom Task Force Griffin flew in excess of 52,000 hours, transported 105,000 personnel, and moved over 25 million pounds of cargo. On 7 August 2006, the units of Aviation Brigade, 1st Infantry Division combined with units of both the 12th Aviation Brigade and the former 11th Aviation Group (inactivated 9 June 2005) and reflagged as the 12th Aviation Brigade (Combat), attached to the 1st Armored Division. On 20 March 2007 the 12th became a separate brigade under V Corps.

The brigade deployed to Iraq in the summer of 2007, organized as Task Force XII. TF XII served in Balad, Iraq as the Corps Aviation Brigade under Multi-National Corps-Iraq over a four-month period before relocating to Taji as the aviation brigade under Multi-National Division-Baghdad. 12 CAB’s 2nd Battalion deployed to Balad and Basarah, Iraq from July 2007 to August 2008 being the last unit in the Army to serve longer than 12 months in Combat. 2nd Battalion deployed again for 12 months to Balad and Mosul, Iraq from November 2009 to November 2010, earning two campaign stars with the change of operation from Operation Iraqi Freedom to Operation New Dawn.

In May 2012, the brigade deployed five of its seven battalions to Afghanistan, while at the same time sending one attack battalion, 3-159th ARB, to Kuwait to support Operation Spartan Shield in the Persian Gulf. Only 1st Battalion, 214th Aviation Regiment (1-214 AVN), remained in Germany. The aviation battalions were organized into similarly equipped task forces, each capable of providing the same mission and support to units operating in RC East, RC West and RC North. 3rd Battalion, 58th Aviation Regiment (Airfield Operations Battalion), (3-58 AOB), known as TF Guardian, deployed to manage the airfield at Tarin Kowt in Regional Command South. While the brigade headquarters redeployed in September as part of the drawdown of surge forces, the battalion task forces Storm, Gunslinger, Guardian, Ready and Pirate remained in Afghanistan providing direct support to units across the country. Task Force Pirate, 1st Battalion, 211th Aviation Regiment (1/211 ARB) from the Utah Army National Guard joined the Griffin Brigade for this deployment, integrated with their active duty counterparts in RC North and RC West. At the height of the deployment, 12th CAB had Soldiers and helicopter crews operating from more than 30 different locations.

== Montenegro ==
In February 2012, a sudden winter storm struck Montenegro, leaving hundreds of people stranded in the mountains of the Eastern European country. While the bulk of the brigade was preparing for an upcoming deployment, 1-214th GSAB sent two UH-60 Blackhawk helicopters, with pilots, aircrews and medical personnel to respond. The deployed team was under the command of COL Robert Levalley of the 361st Civil Affairs unit (Army Reserve), based in Kaiserslautern, Germany. While there, the crews worked with Montenegrin pilots and civilians and combined efforts with helicopters from Croatia, Slovenia and Greece to deliver food and livestock feed, as well as to transport injured civilians to medical facilities there.

== Organization 2025 ==
As of October 2025 the brigade is based in Germany, with its headquarters at Katterbach Army Airfield and subordinate units stationed at Katterbach Army Airfield, Grafenwöhr Army Airfield, and Wiesbaden Army Airfield.

- 12th Combat Aviation Brigade, at Katterbach Army Airfield
  - Headquarters and Headquarters Company, at Katterbach Army Airfield
  - 2nd Battalion (Gunslingers), 159th Aviation Regiment (Attack Reconnaissance Battalion), at Katterbach Army Airfield
    - Headquarters and Headquarters Company
    - A Company, flying AH-64E Guardian attack helicopters
    - B Company, flying AH-64E Guardian attack helicopters
    - C Company, flying AH-64E Guardian attack helicopters
    - D Company (Aviation Support Company)
    - E Company (Forward Support Company)
  - 1st Battalion (Cougar), 214th Aviation Regiment (General Support Aviation Battalion), at Wiesbaden Army Airfield
    - Headquarters and Headquarters Company "Dogfighters"
    - A Company "Aces", at Wiesbaden Army Airfield flying UH-60V Black Hawk utility helicopters
    - B Company "Big Windy", at Katterbach Army Airfield flying CH-47F Chinook heavy lift helicopters
    - C Company "Dust Off", at Grafenwöhr Army Airfield flying HH-60M Black Hawk medical evacuation helicopters
    - D Company "Desperados" (Aviation Support Company), at Wiesbaden Army Airfield
      - D Company Detachment "Dead Rabbits", at Katterbach Army Airfield
    - E Company "Barons", flying C-12U Huron and UC-35A planes from Wiesbaden Army Airfield
