= Beirut Air Bridge =

The Beirut Air Bridge (1984–1998) provided administrative and logistical support the United States embassy in Beirut, Lebanon. The Air Bridge provided the only safe mode of transportation for US diplomats between Larnaca International Airport, Larnaca, Cyprus, and several landing zones in the greater Beirut area.

UH-60 "Blackhawks" from C Co 7/158th Aviation Regiment, 12th Aviation Brigade, V Corps and from Wiesbaden Air Base and Giebelstadt Army Airfield, Germany, provided the "Air Bridge" to the US Embassy in the war-torn city of Beirut. Elements of this unit continued to perform this mission until July 1998.

== Communication ==
The Tactical Satellite Radios were provided and maintained by the 1st Combat Communication Group, Lindsey Air Station, Wiesbaden, Germany. and the Signal Detachment, Support Company of the 1st Battalion, 10th Special Forces Group(Airborne); initially out of Bad Tölz and then Bublingen Germany.

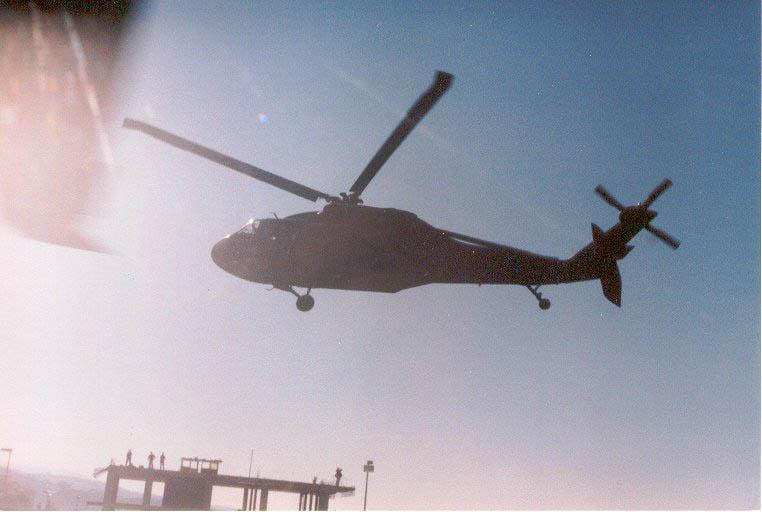
UH-60 Blackhawk at Beirut TOS LZ

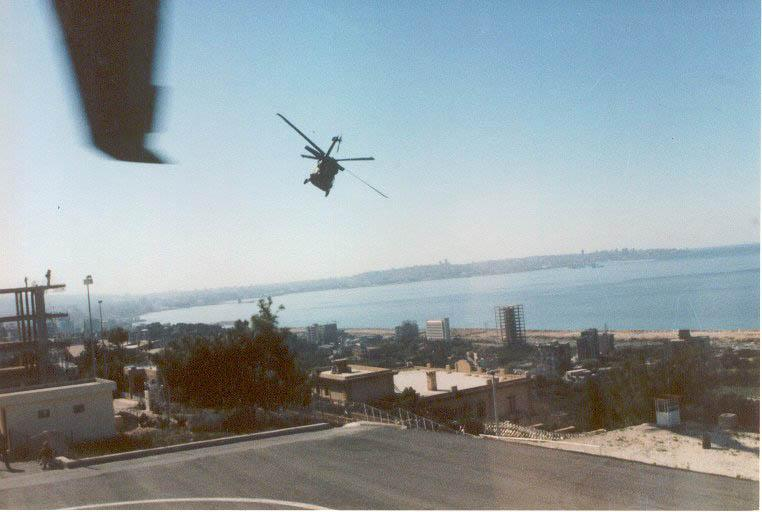
UH-60 Blackhawk at Beirut TOS LZ
