= Joseph B. Starker =

United States Army general

Brigadier General Joseph B. Starker
- Born: January 29, 1929
- Died: July 19, 1975 (aged 46); San Antonio, Texas
- Burial place: Fort Sam Houston National Cemetery
- Spouse: Sallie
- Children: Sallie, Susan
- Military career
- Allegiance: United States of America
- Branch: United States Army
- Service years: 1950 – 1975
- Rank: Brigadier General
- Unit: 1st Cavalry Division
- Commands: 11th Aviation Battalion (1966 – 1967); 17th Aviation Group (1970 – 1971); Combat Developments Experimentation Command
- Conflicts: Korean War; Vietnam War
- Awards: Silver Star; Distinguished Flying Cross; Bronze Star Medal with V; Air Medal with V
- Memorials: Starker Functional Fitness Center, Fort Hood, Texas, Starker Tennis Courts, Fort Hunter Liggett, California

Brigadier General Joseph B. Starker (29 January 1929 – 19 July 1975) was a United States Army aviator who served in the conflicts in Korea and Vietnam. He commanded the 11th Combat Aviation Battalion, 17th Aviation Group, and Combat Developments Experimentation Command. He was struck and killed by a drunk driver while serving as the Assistant Division Commander, 1st Cavalry Division.

== Army aviator ==
As a member of the Howze Board, Starker helped develop the concept of the Air Cavalry Combat Brigade. Later, he was key in the design, organization and testing of the Air Cavalry Combat Brigade. General William E. DePuy, then commander of the 1st Infantry Division, wanted to assign aviation elements to support ground infantry units fighting in Vietnam. Starker's 11th Aviation Battalion was assigned as the test vehicle of this new fighting concept; initially with one assault helicopter company assigned to each U.S. brigade.

== Awards ==
During Brigadier General Starker's distinguished career, he earned the Silver Star, Distinguished Flying Cross, Bronze Star Medal with Valor device and the Air Medal with Valor device.
