= Howze Board =

US Army helicopter concept testing board

The Howze Board was the informal name given to the Tactical Mobility Requirements Board created at the direct request of Secretary of Defense Robert McNamara in 1962 to review and test new concepts integrating helicopters as close air support into the United States Army. Helicopters had been used during the Korean War to ferry wounded and supplies. Some U.S. combat officers recognized the possibility of using armed helicopters to carry heavy ordnance.

But other organizations and branches strenuously objected to allowing the Army to deliver ordnance via aircraft. The Army Staff in the Pentagon responded slowly to a study from the Army Aircraft Requirements Review Board chaired by Lieutenant general Gordon B. Rogers that suggested adopting helicopters for use in a combat role. McNamara bypassed Secretary of the Army Elvis Jacob Stahr Jr., in what many considered a slap in the face, to conduct a review "in an atmosphere divorced from traditional viewpoints and past policies."

McNamara directed Lieutenant General Hamilton H. Howze, the Army's first director of aviation, to conduct a review of the tactical possibilities suggested by the Rogers study. The Board prescribed an airmobility doctrine integrating helicopters into combat. The proposed changes in Army doctrine were equivalent to those made by the United States Cavalry when they got off their horses and adopted use of armor.

== History ==
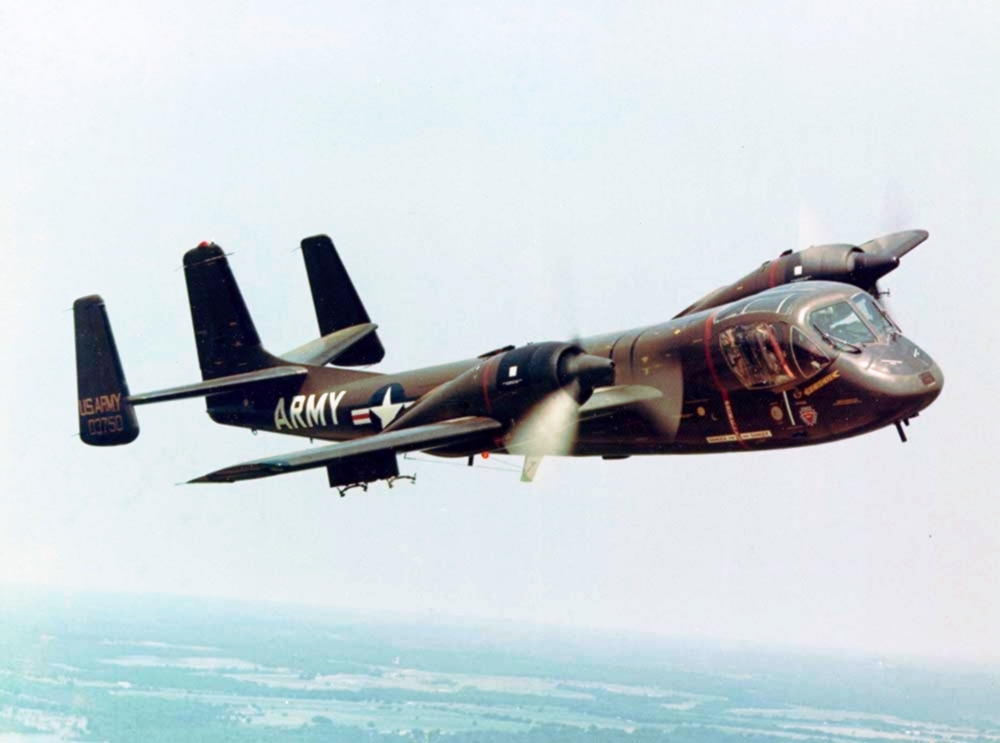
OV-1 Mohawk

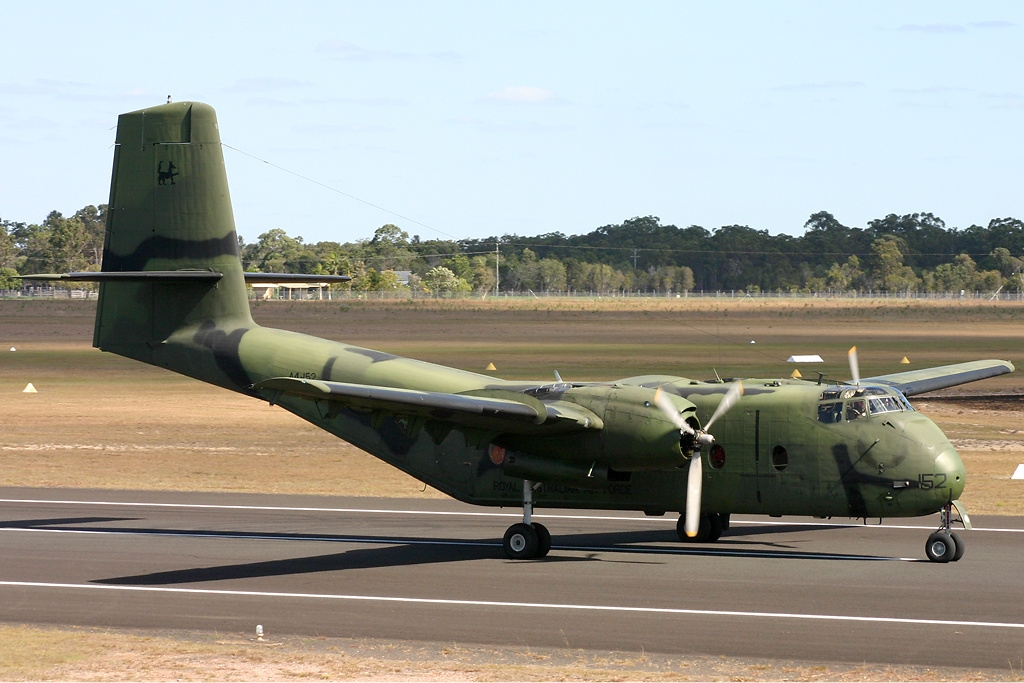
CV-2 Caribou (RAAF version)

The roots of the Howze Board may be found in the 1960 Army Aircraft Requirements Review Board (commonly referred to as the Rogers Board, after its chairman, Lieutenant General Gordon B. Rogers). The Rogers Board concentrated on evaluating aircraft designs (both helicopters and light fixed wing designs) for the Army and did not develop plans for their operational use, focusing instead on design issues and the question of how often replacement designs should be considered. It did recommend that an operational use study be considered, and mentioned the possibility of creating a unit to test operational concepts. Both these suggestions would find expression in the Howze Board.

The Howze Board was also shaped by the growing conflict in South Vietnam and tensions between the Army and the United States Air Force regarding the Army's aviation program in general. Under earlier agreements, the Army could only operate aircraft under certain weight and size restrictions. There were also limits placed on arming such aircraft. The Air Force focused its objections on Army fixed wing aircraft (the OV-1 Mohawk and CV-2 Caribou), and the Caribou was transferred to the Air Force in 1966. Before the Howze Board "the Caribou and the Mohawk were the two major symbols of Army-Air Force disagreement and more time was devoted to these systems than to the entire mobility concept itself."

International events and changes in the defense policy of the United States also played a role in the formation of the board. President John F. Kennedy's Secretary of Defense, Robert McNamara, began his own review of the Army's plans for aviation in late 1961 and came to the conclusion that the Army's plan was perhaps not aggressive enough in light of recent events (South Vietnam, the Berlin crisis and even the Army's own reorganization of its divisions). Feeling that the Army's response to his concerns was still too cautious, he took the unusual step of directing the Secretary of the Army to form a board to review the Army's plans for aviation (especially helicopters) with a fresh approach (a "new look"). This approach was to ignore past policies and restrictions, and shift from ground-based systems to airmobile systems "if it would improve capabilities and effectiveness." McNamara's memo also named the individuals he wished to conduct this review, giving the Secretary of the Army no room to place his own appointees. Finally, McNamara indicated that he wanted the board to use field tests and exercises to validate its recommendations.

I shall be disappointed if the Army's reexamination merely produces logistically oriented recommendations to procure more of the same, rather than a plan for employment of fresh and perhaps unorthodox concepts which will give us a significant increase in mobility.

The Army's response to McNamara's memo was to form a board organized like the earlier Rogers Board. Howze, who had served on the Rogers Board (and was named in McNamara's memo), was selected to chair the Tactical Mobility Requirements Board on 25 April. The actual directive establishing the board was not issued until 3 May, after the board had started working, and Howze was given wide authority to deal with any agencies (military or civilian) he thought might be necessary for the board to complete its evaluation.

== Formation and organization ==
The board was created by a letter from General Herbert B. Powell, Commanding General, Continental Army Command, dated 3 May 1962, although as noted above the board was already functioning by this date. Its eventual membership consisted of 240 military personnel and 53 civilians, not counting those assigned to troop tests, operational analysis, and war gaming. The Board consisted of a governing board, a review committee, an advisory panel, and a secretariat. An additional steering committee was formed from the board president (Howze), the review committee, and the secretariat. All but one of the men mentioned in McNamara's original memo were included on the board, either on the review committee or the secretariat. The bulk of the work was done by working committees and groups (seven committees between 5 May and 21 June, and eight groups from 22 June and July 31).

Notable members:

General Hamiliton H. Howze, President

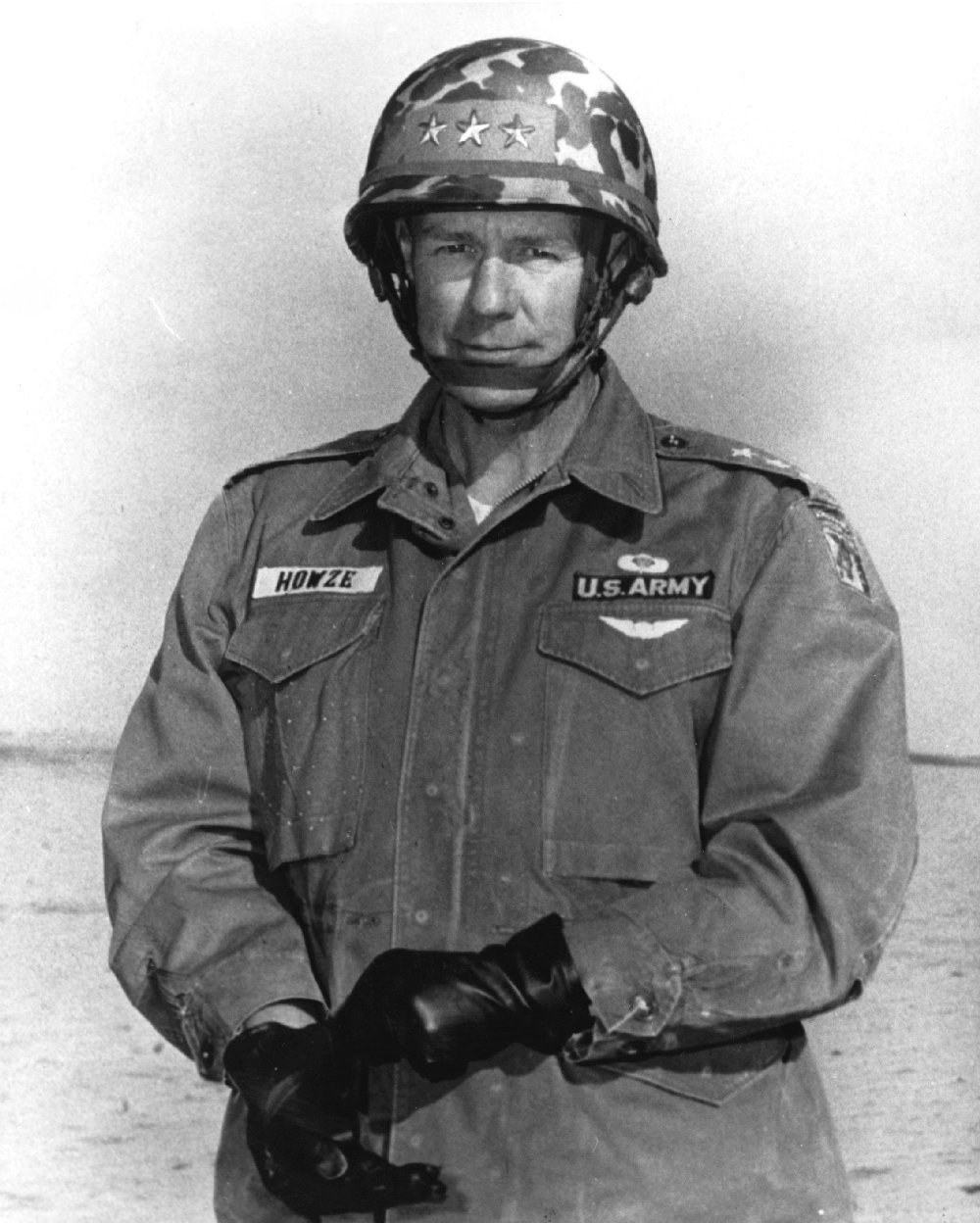
General Hamilton Howze, the president of the board

Brigadier General Joseph B. Starker
Brigadier General Charles Billingslea
Lieutenant General James H. Merryman
Major General George S. Beatty, Jr.
Major General Ben Harrell
Major General William B. Rosson
Major General Clifton F. von Kann°
Major General Norman H. Vissering°
Brigadier General Frederic W. Boye, Jr.°
Brigadier General Walter B. Richardson°
Brigadier General John J. Lane
Brigadier General Edward L. Rowny°
Brigadier General Delk M. Oden
Brigadier General Robert R. Williams
Colonel William M. Lynn, Jr.°
Dr. Jacob A. Stockfisch
Dr. Edwin W. Paxson
Eugene L. Vidal
Fred Wolcott
Frank A. Parker°
Edward H. Heinemann

°Indicates that the member was also a working committee chief.

The board also created and supervised the working groups and committees previously mentioned. The seven committees were: Reconnaissance, Security, and Target Acquisition; Tactical Mobility; Fire Power; Logistics Operations and Logistics Support; Operations Research; Field Tests; and Programs, Policy and Budget. The eight working groups (formed after the committees finished their work) were: Counterinsurgency; Combat Forces; Logistics Forces; Long Range; Strategic Area; Operations Research; Field Tests; and Programs, Policy and Budget. These groups were formed around areas specifically mentioned in McNamama's memo, and were given a great deal of latitude when it came to their actual work.

== Work ==
The board started its work at Fort Bragg, using the Erwin School initially as it was available during the summer months. As the working groups and committees took shape, their work tended to take place wherever the group head happened to be assigned. For example, the chair of the Fire Power Working Group was assigned to Fort Sill, so the bulk of its work took place there instead of at Fort Bragg. While a good part of the board's work consisted of paper studies, the Field Test Group had wide authority to conduct exercises and tests of concepts developed by the other groups. The greatest constraint was time: the board was slated to report its findings to McNamara by 1 September, leaving about six weeks for testing and evaluation.

The Field Test Group conducted a number of tests and exercise to evaluate the recommendations of the other groups. Using one battle group, resources from two others, and 150 aircraft (125 helicopters and 25 fixed-wing), the group conducted 40 field tests. Three of these were week-long tests; evaluating the ability of troops to function in swampy areas in Georgia, testing the concept in counter-guerrilla exercises in western Virginia, and finally a withdrawal under pressure scenario conducted in the Fort Bragg area. The tests used over 11,000 flying hours, many at low altitude and simulating combat conditions as much as possible. Smaller unit tests (16 in all) were conducted before these exercises, and a number of smaller tests took place at the same time to evaluate tactical mobility, firepower, reconnaissance, and logistics operations.

The Board also made extensive use of war gaming to support its final report. This allowed the board to examine the utility of airmobility in larger operations and conventional warfare. For example, the main scenario was centered on the role an airmobile division could play in resisting a Soviet invasion of Iran. It also incorporated ideas forwarded by a team that visited Southeast Asia in June 1962.

== Findings and conclusions ==
The board submitted its final report to the Department of the Army on 20 August 1962, and it reached the Secretary of Defense on 15 September. The report was a large document (two inches thick according to one source) containing a number of recommendations in keeping with McNamara's original charge. The centerpiece of the report were a number of proposed organizations that would make maximum use of both helicopters and fixed-wing aircraft that were either in the Army's existing inventory or under development. The board also recommended that the number of aircraft assigned to existing Army units be increased.

It was the new organizations proposed by the board that drew the most attention. These ranged from smaller concepts such as an Air Ambulance Battalion designed to provide medical evacuation to larger combat units like the Air Assault Division, the Air Cavalry Combat Brigade, and the Corps Aviation Brigade (with a similar Army Aviation Brigade proposed for service in Europe). The Air Assault Division proposed replacing the bulk of a normal division's motorized transport with helicopters (459 compared to the 100 assigned to a normal division - enough to lift one-third of its assigned infantry at one time) and adding an attack aviation component (aerial rocket artillery) to replace larger weapons that could not be lifted by helicopters. The Air Cavalry Combat Brigade was intended to "rely on aerial firepower" and operate in either an anti-armor or counterinsurgency role. Almost half of its assigned helicopters were to be attack versions, and it would be capable of lifting all its assigned infantry with its own helicopters.

The board's concluding statement was simple:

Adoption of the Army of the airmobile concept—however imperfectly it may be described and justified in this report—is necessary and desirable. In some respects the transition is inevitable, just as was that from animal mobility to motor."

== Reactions and results ==
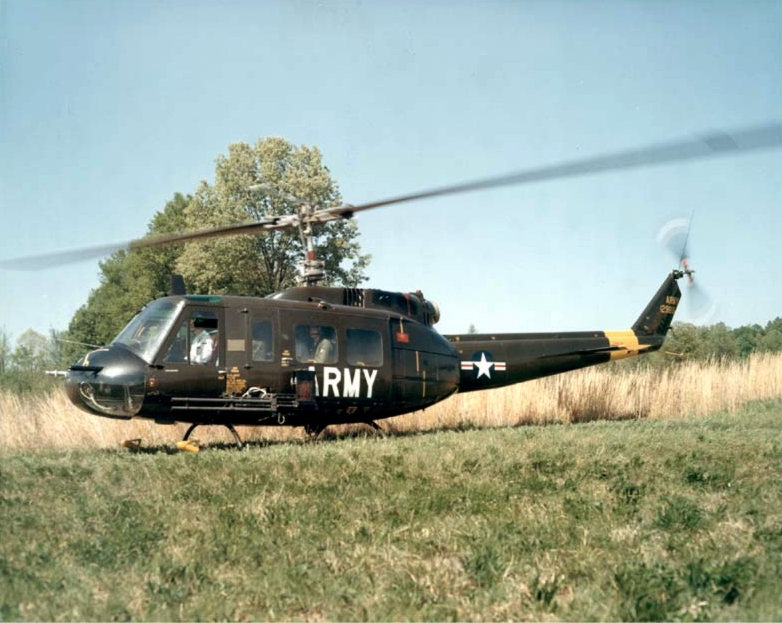
The UH-1 "Huey" - key to many of the airmobile concepts produced by the board

The Air Force, which had been a major part of President Dwight D. Eisenhower's strategic vision, reacted strongly to the findings of the Howze Board. It was Air Force Chief of Staff Curtis LeMay's position that the Air Force "should operate 'everything that flies, right down the last puddle jumper'", and he felt that the organizations proposed by the Howze Board would infringe on the Air Force's territory. Left unsaid was that airmobility would be expensive, and the Air Force also feared a reduction in their portion of the defense budget and the resulting cancellation of programs. LeMay directed the Air Force to form its own Board (chaired by Lt. Gen. Gabriel Disosway and known as the Disosway Board) to present its views on the subject. McNamara rejected the Disosway Board's conclusions, preferring the options developed by the Howze Board.

The Army's response to the board's report (and McNamara's favorable reception of its recommendations) was to create a special unit to test the board's main recommendation (the formation of an Air Assault Division). The 11th Air Assault Division (Test) was activated in February 1963 specifically to test the concept, and its commander (Major General Harry Kinnard) was given a great deal of control over the unit's organization and training (from selecting officers for command positions to an almost unlimited budget and scope of operations). Over the next two years, Kinnard's division conducted a number of exercises and maneuvers to demonstrate that airmobility was practical and flexible enough to meet the vision of the board's final report.

Many of the board's other recommendations remained paper ideas. Only one airmobile division was formed instead of the five suggested in the report, and other concepts never left the idea stage. The Air Cavalry Combat Brigade idea was never officially tested, although an improvised version did operate for a limited time in 1971 in South Vietnam.
