= Bamberg-Breitenau Airfield =

Bamberg-Breitenau Airport Flugplatz Bamberg-Breitenau
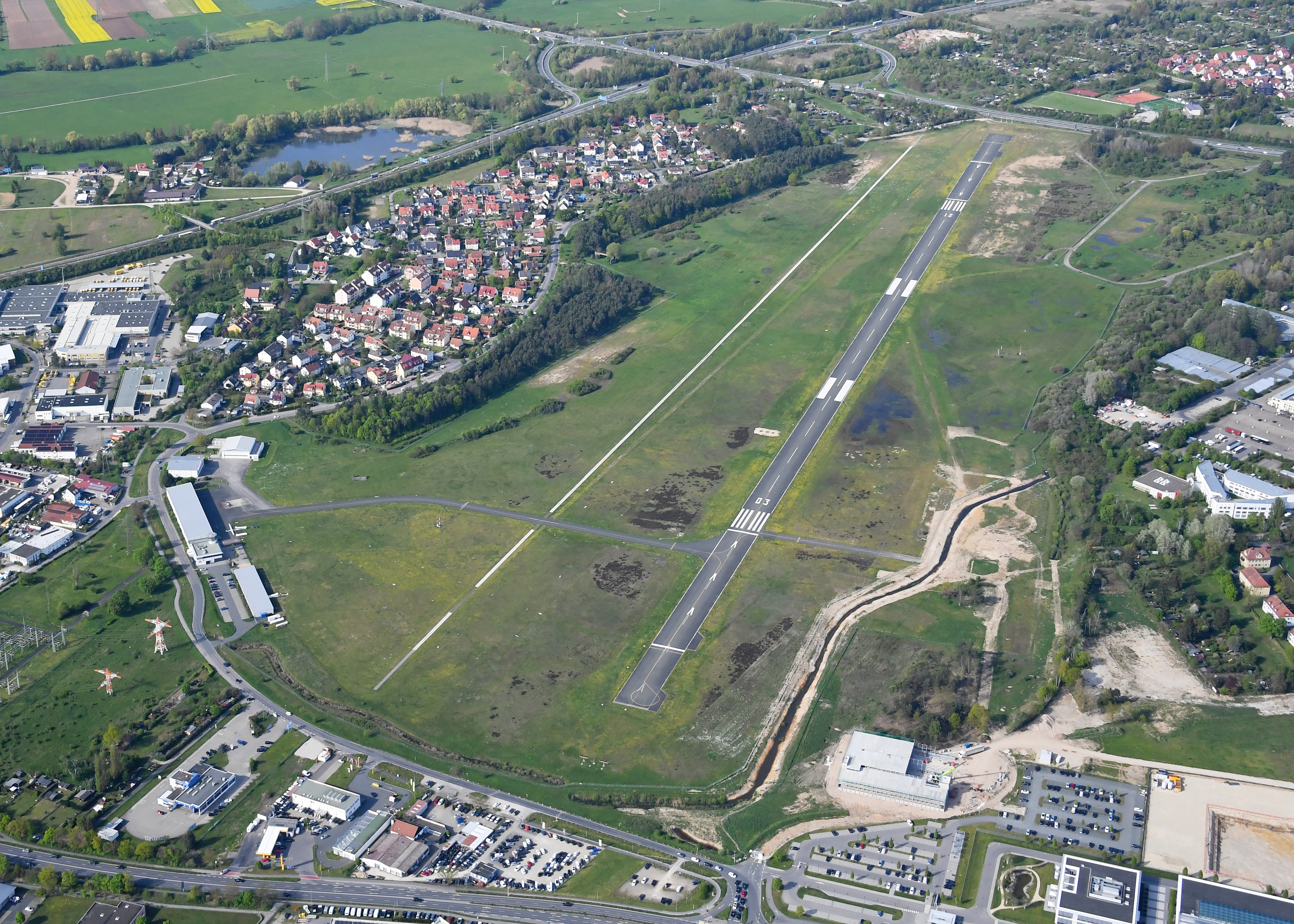
- IATA: QCB; ICAO: EDQA

Summary
- Airport type: Public
- Owner: Stadtwerke Bamberg
- Operator: Aero-Club Bamberg
- Serves: Bamberg
- Location: Bamberg
- Elevation AMSL: 811 ft / 247 m
- Coordinates: 49°54′14″N 10°54′52″E
- Website: https://aeroclub-bamberg.de/

Map
- Location of airport in Bavaria

Runways
| Direction | Length | | Surface |
| Direction | m | ft | Surface |
|---|---|---|---|
| 03/21 | 1,104 | 3,622 | Asphalt |
- Source: Bamberg Airfield Details

The Bamberg-Breitenau Airfield (ICAO code: EDQA) is an airfield of the Upper Franconian town of Bamberg, Germany. It was operated by the United States Army from 1945 to 2012 as Bamberg Army Airfield (ICAO code: ETEJ), but was already used mainly for civil air traffic at that time. Today, the airfield is approved for sport and business jets up to 10,000 kg maximum take-off mass (MTOW), a refueling system is available. The airfield is operated by Stadtwerke Bamberg in cooperation with the Aero-Club Bamberg e.V., which is responsible for handling flight operations.
