= Blackhorse Base Camp =

Blackhorse Base Camp (Blackhorse Airfield) (Evans Army Airfield)
- Xuân Lộc, Đồng Nai Province in Vietnam
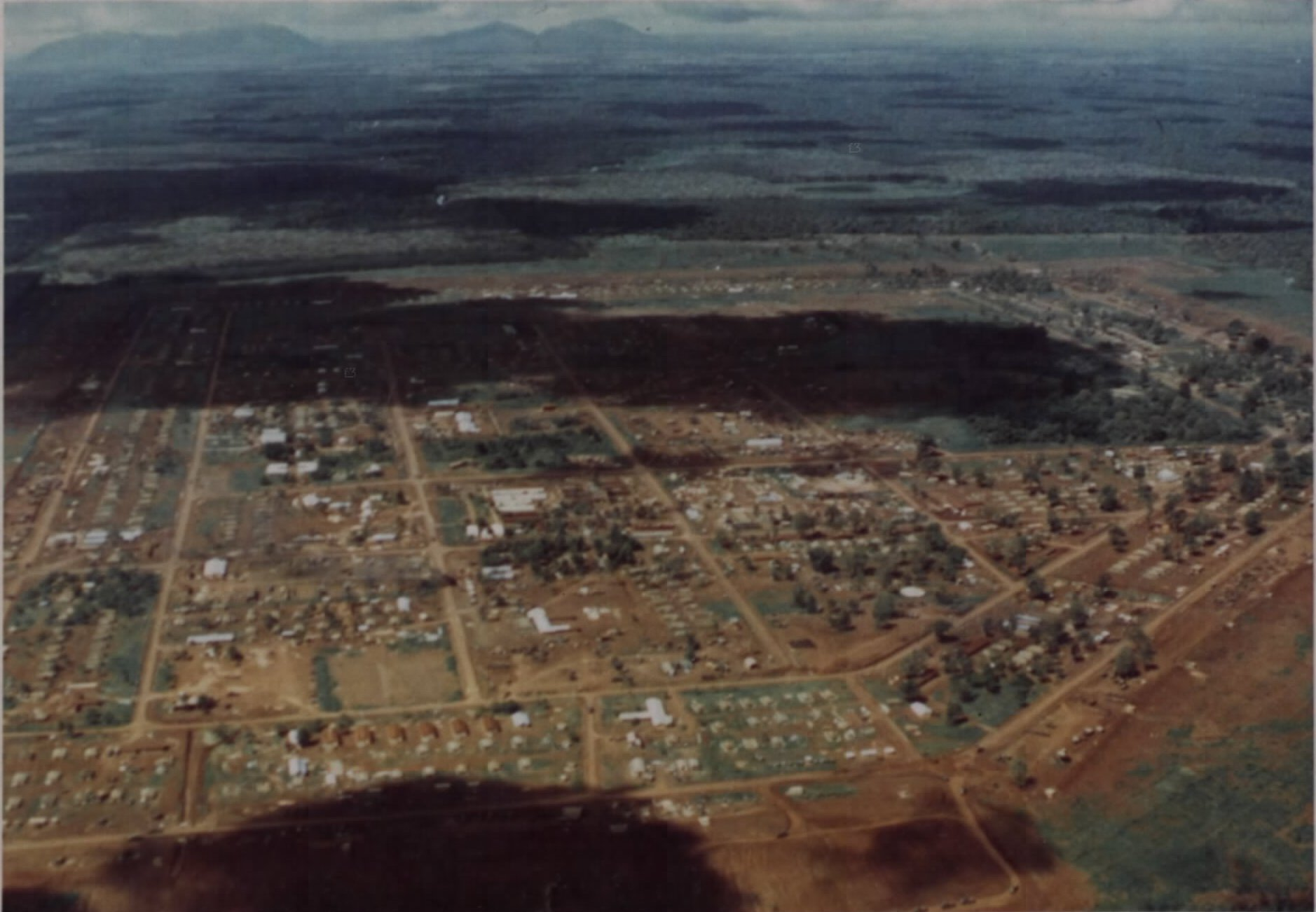
- Aerial view of Blackhorse Base Camp, July 1967

Site information
- Type: Army Base
- Operator: Army of the Republic of Vietnam (ARVN); United States Army (U.S. Army); People's Army of Vietnam
- Condition: Abandoned

Location
- Shown within Vietnam
- Coordinates: 10.827°N 107.229°E

Site history
- Built: 1966
- In use: 1966-
- Battles/wars: Vietnam War

Garrison information
- Garrison: 11th Armored Cavalry Regiment; 199th Light Infantry Brigade; 2nd Brigade, 25th Infantry Division

Airfield information
- Elevation: 820 feet (250 m) AMSL
Runways
Direction	Length and surface
00/00	2,300 feet (701 m) Asphalt

Blackhorse Base Camp (also known as LZ Blackhorse or simply Xuân Lộc) is a former U.S. Army base and current People's Army of Vietnam (PAVN) base near the town of Xuân Lộc in Đồng Nai Province in southern Vietnam.

== History ==
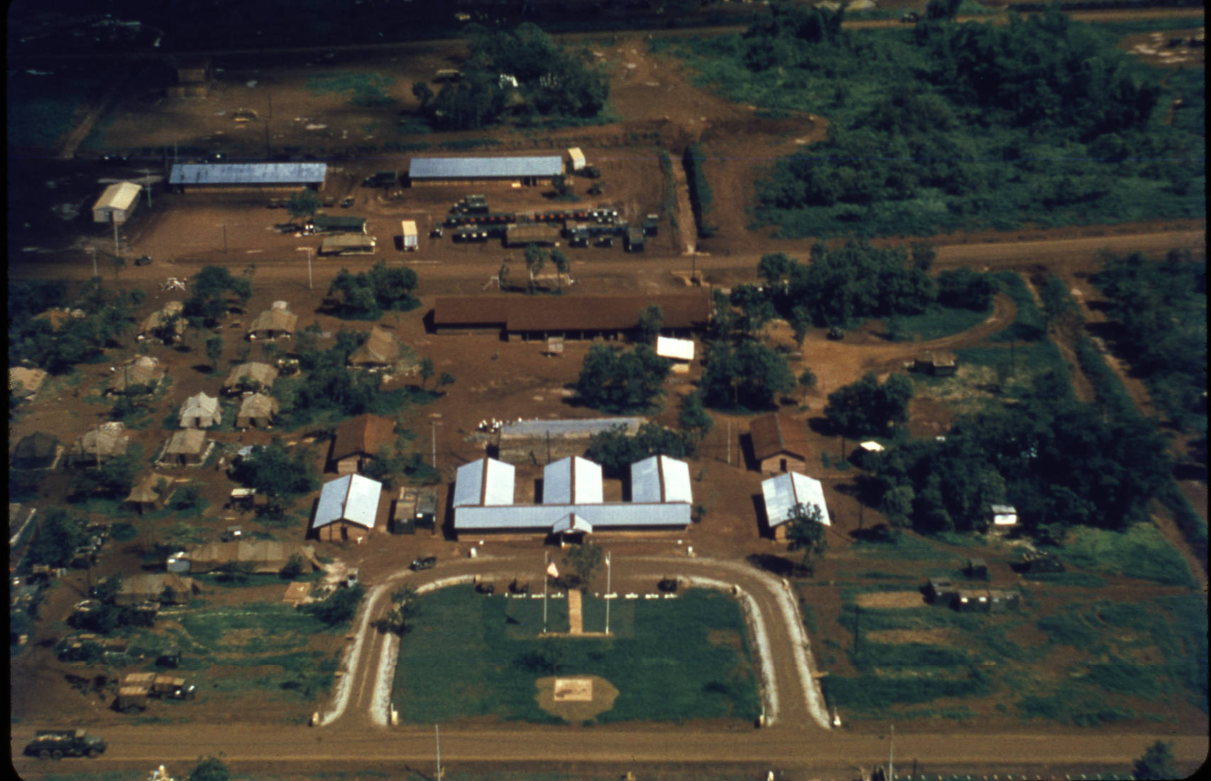
11th ACR HQ, 19 July 1967

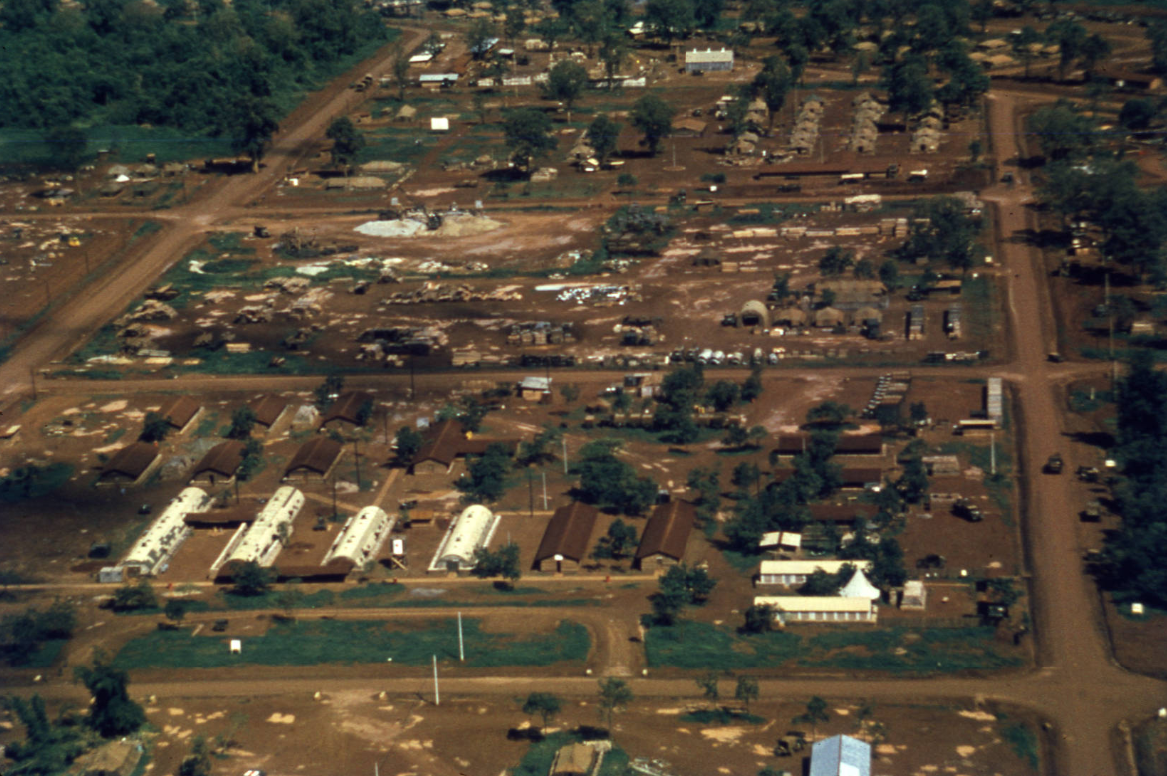
7th Surgical Hospital ("Blackhorse hospital"), 19 July 1967

Blackhorse was established in late October 1966 as the base camp for the 11th Armored Cavalry Regiment (11th ACR). The camp was located on the main highway, QL-2 (now QL-56) 13 km southwest of Xuân Lộc and 28 km north of Nui Dat. The camp took its name from the black horse shoulder sleeve insignia of the 11th ACR.

The 11th ACR had its headquarters at Blackhorse from March 1967 until January 1969.

Other units stationed at Blackhorse included:

- 57th Medical Detachment (Helicopter Ambulance) (UH-1H Iroquois)
- 7th Surgical Hospital (August 1966 – October 1969)
- 135th Assault Helicopter Company with RAN (Dec, 67- Nov 68)
- 2nd Battalion, 35th Artillery (Mid 1966 – April 1970)
- 1st Battalion, 83rd Artillery (October 1966 – March 1968)
- 199th Light Infantry Brigade (September 1969 – July 1970) comprising:
  - 2nd Battalion, 3rd Infantry
  - 3rd Battalion, 7th Infantry
  - 4th Battalion, 12th Infantry
- 1st Battalion, 5th Infantry (August 1970 – April 1971)
- 2nd Battalion, 12th Infantry (July–December 1970)
- 2nd Brigade, 25th Infantry Division (December 1970 – April 1971) comprising:
  - 3rd Battalion, 22nd Infantry
  - 1st Battalion, 27th Infantry
  - 2nd Battalion, 27th Infantry

The base was turned over to the Army of the Republic of Vietnam 18th Division on 24 October 1969.

== Current use ==
The base remains in use by the PAVN as a base for the 302nd Infantry Division, a component of the 7th Military Region (Vietnam People's Army). The address is 302 Sư Đoàn 88, Long Giao, Cẩm Mỹ.
