= Stallion Army Airfield =

Military airfield in New Mexico

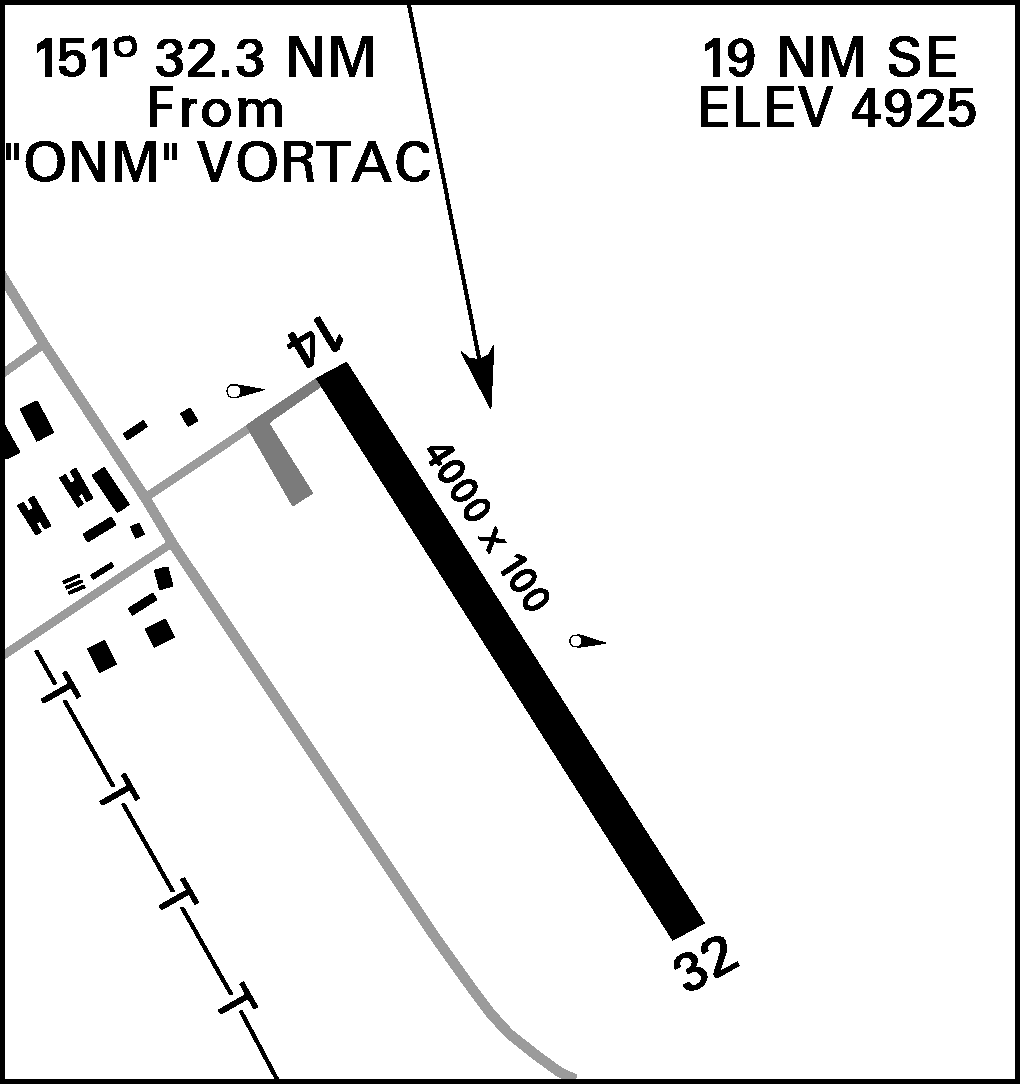
- IATA: none; ICAO: none; FAA LID: 95E

Summary
- Airport type: Military
- Owner/Operator: United States Army
- Serves: White Sands Missile Range
- Location: Socorro County, New Mexico
- Elevation AMSL: 4,925 ft / 1,501 m
- Coordinates: 33°49.14′N 106°38.70′W

Map
- Location in New Mexico

Runways
Direction	Length		Surface
Direction	ft	m	Surface
14/32	4,000	1,219	Asphalt
- Source: Federal Aviation Administration, DoD FLIP

Stallion Army Airfield (FAA LID: 95E) is a military airport in Socorro County, New Mexico. The airfield serves the White Sands Missile Range, in the northwest corner of which it is located.
