= Fort Harrison Army Airfield =

Military airfield in Montana

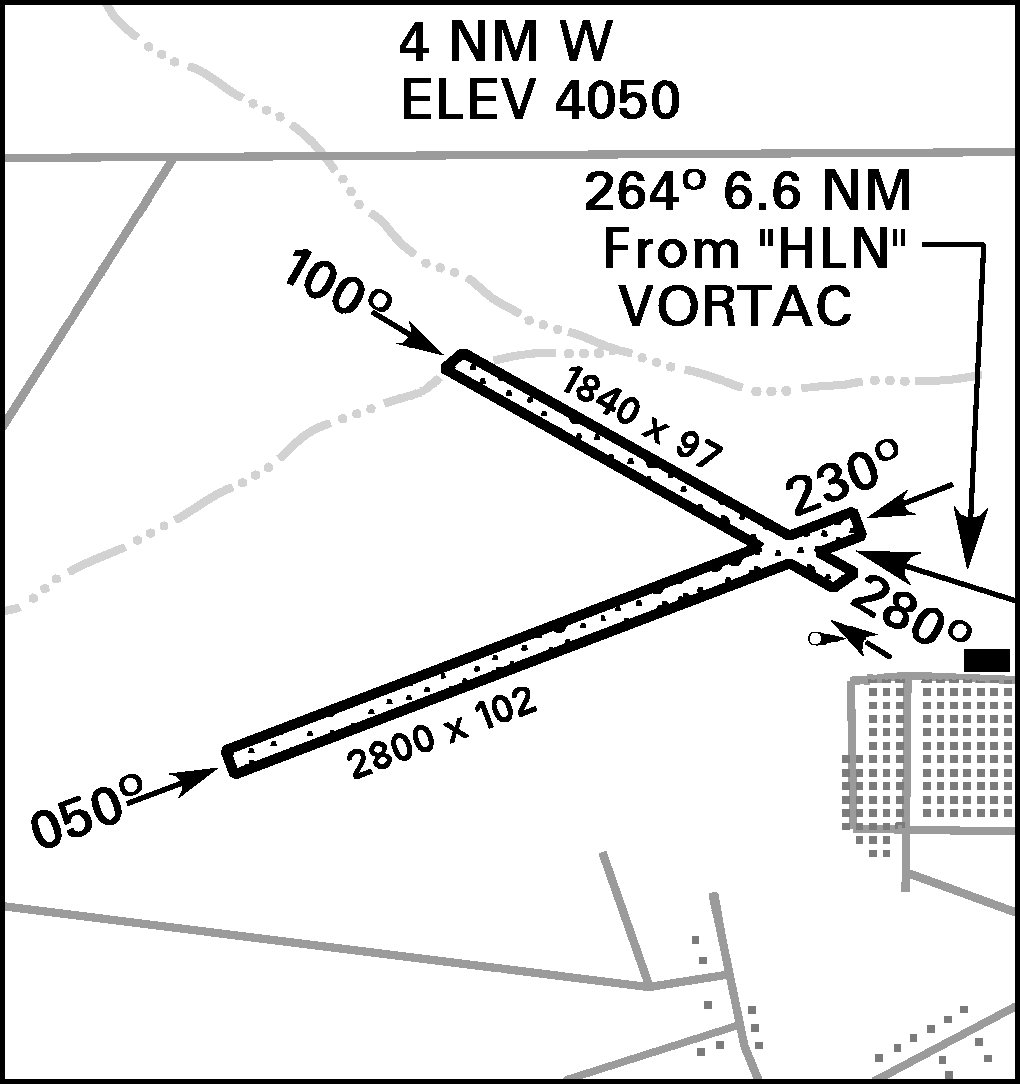
- IATA: none; ICAO: none; FAA LID: MT15

Summary
- Airport type: Military
- Owner: United States Army
- Operator: Montana Army National Guard
- Elevation AMSL: 4,069 ft (1,240 m)
- Coordinates: 46°37′29.1″N 112°6′39.17″W

Map
- Location in Montana

Runways
Direction	Length		Surface
Direction	ft	m	Surface
05/23	2,150	655	Turf
10/28	1,840	561	Turf
- Source: Federal Aviation Administration, DoD FLIP

Fort Harrison Army Airfield (FAA LID: MT15) is a military airport near Helena, the capital of Montana. It is part of Fort Harrison which is home to the Montana National Guard.
