= 11th Aviation Battalion =

- 11th Aviation Battalion Coat of Arms
- Active: 21 August 1965 – 16 September 1987
- Country: United States of America
- Branch: United States Army
- Type: Army Aviation
- Size: Battalion
- Part of: 1st Cavalry Division
- Nickname: Red Dogs
- Motto: EXEMPLA PROPONERE (To Set Forth Examples)
- Engagements: Vietnam War: Operation Attleboro
- Decorations: Valorous Unit Award, Meritorious Unit Commendation (Army), Republic of Vietnam Cross of Gallantry (6), Republic of Vietnam Civil Action Unit Citation (2)

Commanders
- Notable commanders: Joseph B. Starker, Leo E. Soucek

Insignia
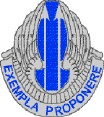
- Distinctive Unit Insignia

Aircraft flown
- Utility helicopter: Bell UH-1 Iroquois

The 11th Aviation Battalion was a United States Army aviation unit that fought in the Vietnam War. The unit served as a test for helicopter support of ground infantry units.

== History ==
The unit was constituted on 21 August 1965 and activated on 23 August 1965 at Fort Benning, Ga. The Battalion was inactivated on 16 September 1987. The 11th Aviation Battalion stationed at Fliegerhorst Kaserne in Erlensee, Germany, was the air wing of V Corps. The 1st Battalion, 11th Aviation Regiment, at Fort Rucker, now carries the 11th Aviation Battalion's lineage.

== Organizational structure in the Vietnam War ==
The organizational structure of the 11th Aviation Battalion reflected the following units in 1966/7:

- HQ and HQ Company at Phu Loi Base Camp
- 390th Quartermaster Detachment (PETRL) at Long Binh Post
- 116th Assault Helicopter Company at Củ Chi Base Camp
  - 283rd Signal Detachment (RL) Cu Chi
  - 392nd Transportation Detachment (KD) at Cu Chi
  - 431st Medical Detachment (OA) at Cu Chi
- 128th Assault Helicopter Company at Phu Loi
  - 285th Signal Detachment (RL) at Phu Loi
  - 393rd Transportation Detachment (KD) at Phu Loi
  - 432nd Medical Detachment (OA) at Phu Loi
- 162nd Assault Helicopter Company at Phước Vĩnh Base Camp
  - 407th Transportation Detachment (KD) at Phuoc Vinh
  - 450th Signal Detachment (RL) at Phuoc Vinh
  - 758th Medical Detachment (OA) at Phuoc Vinh
- 173rd Assault Helicopter Company at Lai Khê
  - 408th Transportation Detachment (KD) at Lai Khe
  - 451st Signal Detachment (RL) at Lai Khe
  - 759th Medical Detachment (OA) at Lai Khe
- 178th Assault Support Helicopter Company at Phu Loi
  - 400th Transportation Detachment (AB) Phu Loi
- 184th Reconnaissance Airplane Company at Phu Loi
  - 243rd Signal Detachment (RL) at Phu Loi
- 205th Assault Support Helicopter Company at Phu loi
  - 612th Transportation Detachment (AB) at Phu Loi
- 213th Combat Assault Support Helicopter Company at Phu Loi
  - 329th Transportation Detachment (AB) at Phu Loi
- 178th Assault Support Helicopter Company at Phu Loi
  - 400th Transportation Detachment (AB) at Phu Loi

== Commanders ==
=== In Vietnam ===
- LTC John W. Lauterbach, in command on 1 January 1966.
- LTC Joseph B. Starker; assumed command on 20 May 1966.
- LTC Leo E. Soucek; assumed command on 7 May 1967, later retiring as a Brigadier General.
- LTC William A. Hobbs; assumed command on 10 November 67.
- LTC William F. Bauman; assumed command on 22 April 1968.
- LTC Robert W. Flint, in command on 31 January 1970.

=== In Germany ===
- Tommy Stiner

== Awards and decorations ==
=== Campaign credit ===
Conflict	Streamer	Year(s)
Vietnam War	Defense	1965
Vietnam War	Counteroffensive	1965–1966
Vietnam War	Counteroffensive, Phase II	1966–1967
Vietnam War	Counteroffensive, Phase III	1967–1968
Vietnam War	Tet Counteroffensive	1968
Vietnam War	Counteroffensive, Phase IV	1968
Vietnam War	Counteroffensive, Phase V	1968
Vietnam War	Counteroffensive, Phase VI	1968–1969
Vietnam War	Tet 69/Counteroffensive	1969
Vietnam War	Summer-Fall 1969	1969
Vietnam War	Winter-Spring 1970	1969–1970
Vietnam War	Sanctuary Counteroffensive	
Vietnam War	Counteroffensive, Phase VII	
Vietnam War	Consolidation I	
Vietnam War	Consolidation II	

=== Unit decorations ===
Ribbon	Award	Year	Notes
	Valorous Unit Award (Army)	4 – 20 Nov 66	DAU TIENG-SUOI DA
	Meritorious Unit Commendation (Army)	1 Jan – 31 Dec 67	VIETNAM 1967
	Republic of Vietnam Cross of Gallantry, with Palm	Dec 65 – Jun 66	For service in Vietnam
	Republic of Vietnam Cross of Gallantry, with Palm	1 Mar 66 – 26 Mar 67	For service in Vietnam
	Republic of Vietnam Cross of Gallantry, with Palm	22 Feb 67 – 17 May 68	For service in Vietnam
	Republic of Vietnam Cross of Gallantry, with Palm	1 Jan 69 – 30 Sep 70	For service in Vietnam
	Republic of Vietnam Cross of Gallantry, with Palm	1 Oct 70 – 31 Aug 72	For service in Vietnam
	Republic of Vietnam Cross of Gallantry, with Palm	26 Sep – 10 Oct 71	For service in Vietnam
	Republic of Vietnam Civil Action Unit Citation	1 May 69 – 15 May 70	For service in Vietnam
	Republic of Vietnam Civil Action Unit Citation	1 Jan – 31 Dec 71	For service in Vietnam
