= Grafenwöhr Army Airfield =

Military airfield in Germany

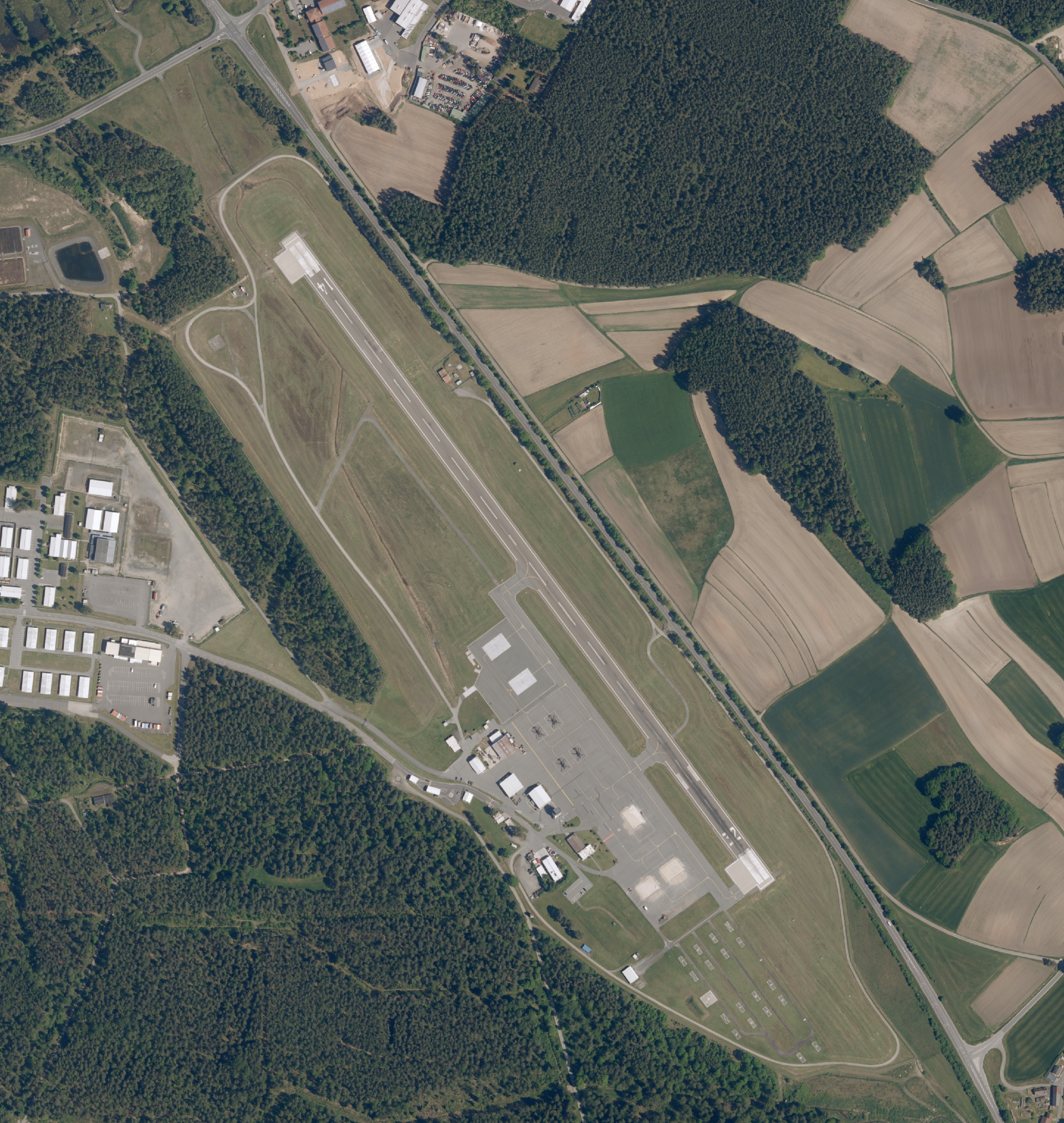
- IATA: none; ICAO: ETIC

Summary
- Airport type: Military
- Operator: United States Army
- Elevation AMSL: 1,361 ft / 415 m
- Coordinates: 49.6985°N 11.9402°E

Map
- Location in Germany

Runways
Direction	Length		Surface
Direction	ft	m	Surface
14/32	3,334	1,016	Asphalt
- Sources: DoD FLIP

Grafenwöhr Army Airfield (ICAO: ETIC) is a military airport near Grafenwöhr, a small town in Bavaria, Germany. It is located adjacent to the Grafenwöhr Training Area, for which it acts as an air assault zone.
