= Panavia Tornado =

Family of multi-role combat aircraft

Tornado IDS/ECR
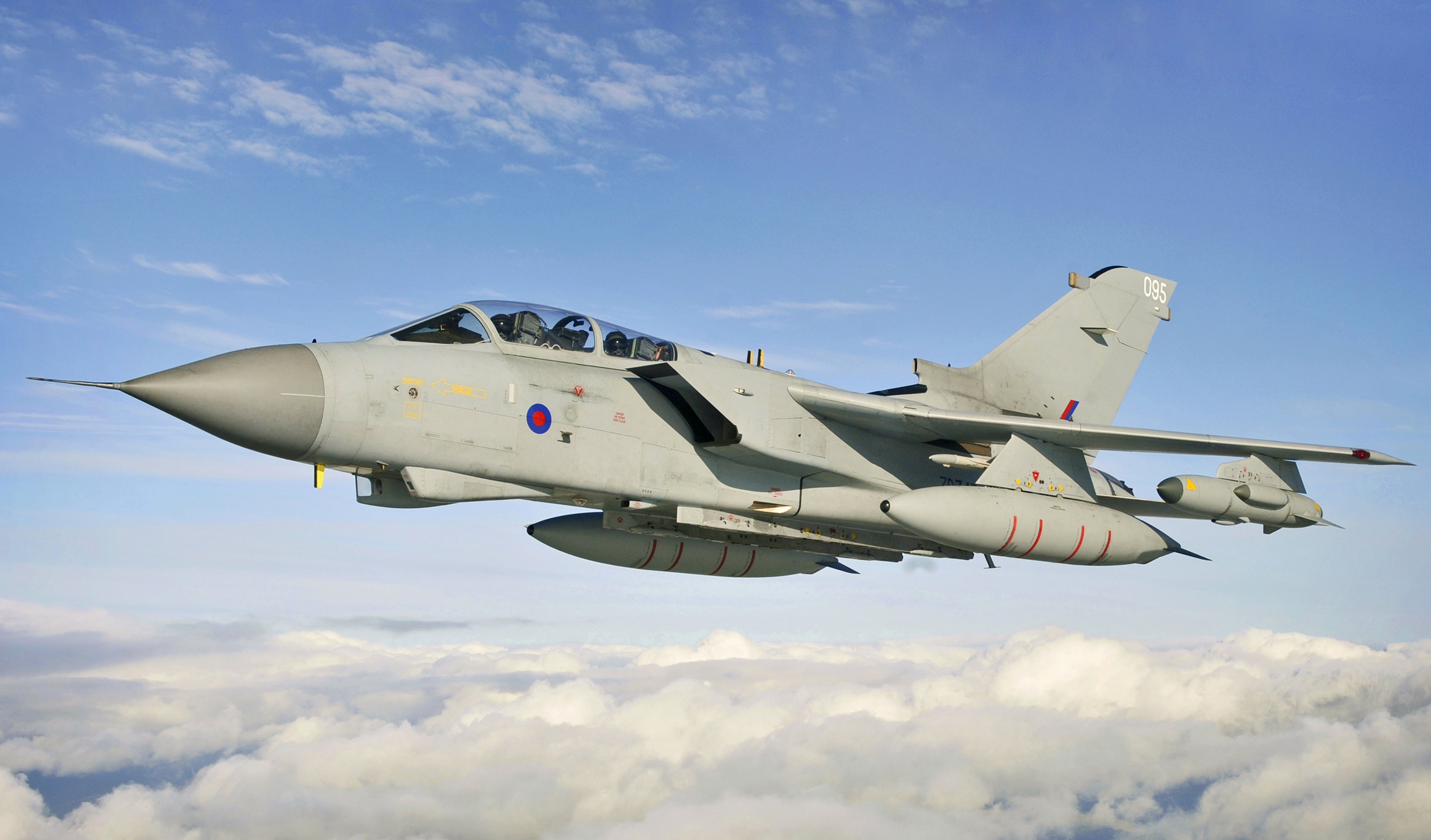
- RAF Tornado GR4 in 2012

General information
- Type: Multirole aircraft, strike aircraft
- National origin: Italy, West Germany, United Kingdom
- Manufacturer: Panavia Aircraft GmbH
- Status: In service
- Primary users: German Air Force: Italian Air Force; Royal Saudi Air Force; Royal Air Force (historical)
- Number built: 990: 745, Tornado IDS; 194, Tornado ADV; 51, Tornado ECR

History
- Manufactured: 1979–1998
- Introduction date: 1979
- First flight: 14 August 1974
- Retired: 2019 (RAF)
- Variant: Panavia Tornado ADV

The Panavia Tornado is a family of twin-engine, variable-sweep wing multi-role combat aircraft, jointly developed and manufactured by Italy, the United Kingdom, and Germany. (Note: Before the German reunification, this was West Germany.) There are three primary Tornado variants: the Tornado IDS (interdictor/strike) fighter-bomber, the Tornado ECR (electronic combat/reconnaissance) SEAD aircraft, and the Tornado ADV (air defence variant) interceptor aircraft.

The Tornado was developed and built by Panavia Aircraft GmbH, a tri-national consortium consisting of British Aerospace (previously British Aircraft Corporation), MBB (Note: MBB was acquired by DASA in 1989.) of West Germany, and Aeritalia of Italy. It first flew on 14 August 1974 and was introduced into service in 1979–1980. Due to its multirole design, it was able to replace several different types of aircraft in the adopting air forces. The Royal Saudi Air Force (RSAF) became the only export operator of the Tornado, in addition to the three original partner nations. A training and evaluation unit operating from RAF Cottesmore, the Tri-National Tornado Training Establishment, maintained a level of international co-operation beyond the production stage. It is the only non-American-developed aircraft currently approved to carry United States nuclear weapons under NATO's Nuclear Planning Group.

The Tornado was operated by the Royal Air Force (RAF), Italian Air Force, and RSAF during the Gulf War of 1991, in which the Tornado conducted many low-altitude penetrating strike missions. The Tornados of various services were also used in the Bosnian War, Kosovo War, Iraq War, in Libya during the 2011 Libyan civil war, as well as smaller roles in Afghanistan, Yemen, and Syria. Including all variants, 990 aircraft were built.

== Development ==
=== Origins ===
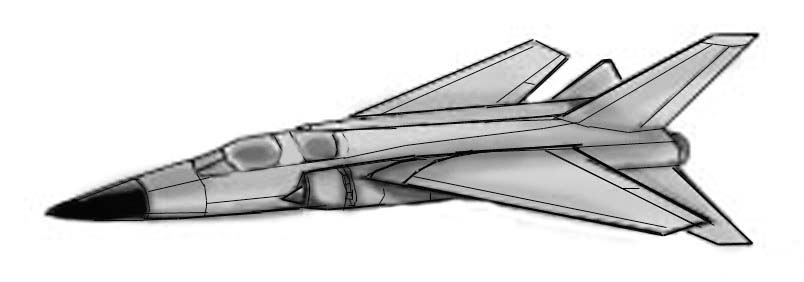
Artist's concept of the AFVG, a precusor of the MRCA programme

During the 1960s, aeronautical designers looked to variable-geometry wing designs to gain the maneuverability and efficient cruise of straight wings with the speed of swept wing designs. The United Kingdom had cancelled the procurement of the BAC TSR-2 tactical strike and reconnaissance aircraft in 1965 and then—in 1967—the US General Dynamics F-111K aircraft that was supposed to fulfil the same role, and was still looking for a replacement for its Avro Vulcan strategic bomber and Blackburn Buccaneer strike aircraft. Britain and France had initiated the BAC/Dassault AFVG (from "Anglo-French Variable Geometry") project in 1965, but this had ended with French withdrawal in 1967. Britain continued to develop a variable-geometry aircraft similar to the proposed AFVG, and sought new partners to achieve this. West German EWR with Boeing then with Fairchild-Hiller and Republic Aviation had been developing design studies of the swing-wing EWR-Fairchild-Hiller A400 AVS Advanced Vertical Strike (which has a similar configuration to the Tornado) from 1964 to 1968.

In 1968, West Germany, the Netherlands, Belgium, Italy and Canada formed a working group to examine replacements for the Lockheed F-104G Starfighter multi-role fighter-bomber, initially called the Multi Role Aircraft (MRA), later renamed as the Multi Role Combat Aircraft (MRCA). As the partner nations' requirements were so diverse, it was decided to develop a single aircraft that could perform a variety of missions that were previously undertaken by a fleet of different aircraft. Britain joined the MRCA group in 1968, represented by Air Vice-Marshal Michael Giddings, and a memorandum of agreement was drafted between Britain, West Germany, and Italy in May 1969.

By the end of 1968, the prospective purchases from the six countries amounted to 1,500 aircraft. Canada and Belgium had departed before any long-term commitments had been made to the programme; Canada had found the project politically unpalatable, there being a perception in political circles that much of the manufacturing and specifications were focused on Western Europe. France had made a favourable offer to Belgium on the Dassault Mirage 5.

=== Panavia Aircraft GmbH ===
On 26 March 1969, four partner nations – United Kingdom, Germany, Italy and the Netherlands, agreed to form a multinational company, Panavia Aircraft GmbH, to develop and manufacture the MRCA. The project's aim was to produce an aircraft capable of undertaking missions in the tactical strike, reconnaissance, air defence, and maritime roles. Various concepts, including alternative fixed-wing and single-engine designs, were studied while defining the aircraft. The Netherlands pulled out of the project in 1970, citing that the aircraft was too complicated and technical for the RNLAF's preferences, which had sought a simpler aircraft with outstanding manoeuvrability. An additional blow was struck when the German requirement reduced from an initial 600 aircraft to 324 in 1972. It has been suggested that Germany deliberately placed an unrealistically high initial order to secure the company headquarters and initial test flight in Germany rather than the UK, to have a bigger design influence.

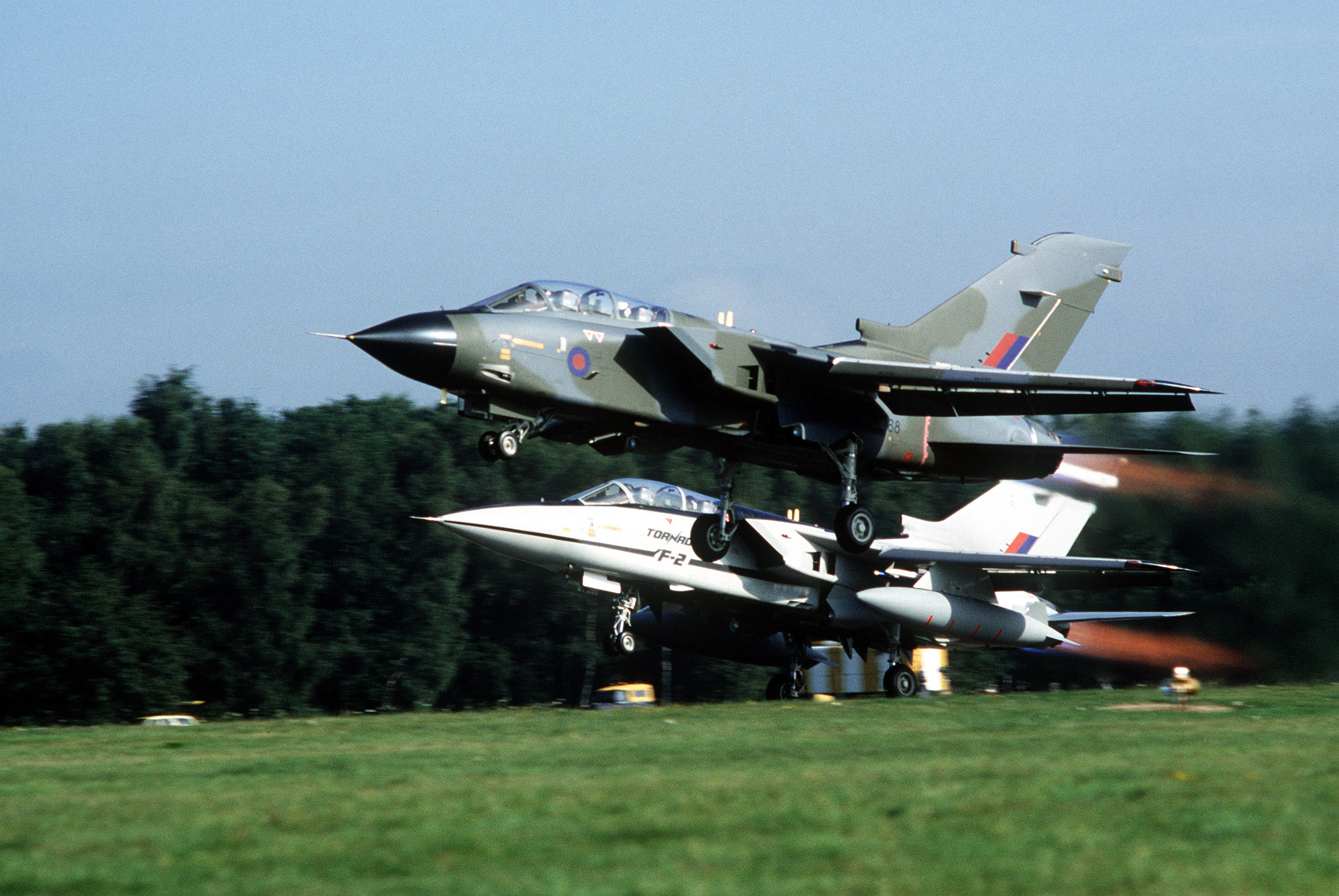
Formation take-off of an RAF Tornado GR.1 and a Tornado F.2 prototype in September 1982

When the agreement was finalised, the United Kingdom and West Germany each had a 42.5% stake of the workload, with the remaining 15% going to Italy; this division of the production work was heavily influenced by international political bargaining. The front fuselage and tail assembly was assigned to BAC (now BAE Systems) in the United Kingdom; the centre fuselage to MBB (now part of Airbus) in West Germany; and the wings to Aeritalia (now Leonardo) in Italy. Similarly, tri-national worksharing was used for engines and equipment. A separate multinational company, Turbo-Union, was formed in June 1970 to develop and build the RB199 engines for the aircraft, with ownership split 40% Rolls-Royce, 40% MTU, and 20% FIAT.

At the conclusion of the project definition phase in May 1970, the concepts were reduced to two designs; a single seat Panavia 100 which West Germany initially preferred, and the twin-seat Panavia 200 which the RAF preferred. The aircraft was briefly called the Panavia Panther, and the project soon coalesced towards the two-seat option. In September 1971, the three governments signed an Intention to Proceed (ITP) document, at which point the aircraft was intended solely for the low-level strike mission, where it was viewed as a viable threat to Soviet defences in that role. It was at this point that Britain's Chief of the Defence Staff announced, "two-thirds of the fighting front line will be composed of this single, basic aircraft type".

=== Prototypes and testing ===
The first of fifteen development aircraft (nine prototypes, P.01 to P.09, and six pre-series, PS.11 to PS.16) flew on 14 August 1974 at Manching, Germany; the pilot, Paul Millett described his experience: "Aircraft handling was delightful... the actual flight went so smoothly that I did begin to wonder whether this was not yet another simulation". Flight testing led to the need for minor modifications. Airflow disturbances were corrected by re-profiling the engine intakes and the fuselage to minimise surging and buffeting at supersonic speeds.

According to Jim Quinn, programmer of the Tornado development simulation software and engineer on the Tornado engine and engine controls, the prototype was safely capable of reaching supercruise, but the engines had severe safety issues at high altitude while trying to decelerate. At high altitude and low turbine speed the compressor did not provide enough pressure to hold back the combustion pressure and would result in a violent vibration as the combustion pressure backfired into the intake. To avoid this effect the engine controls would automatically increase the minimum idle setting as altitude increased, until at very high altitudes the idle setting was so high, however, that it was close to maximum dry thrust. This resulted in one of the test aircraft being stuck in a Mach 1.2 supercruise at high altitude and having to reduce speed by turning the aircraft, because the idle setting at that altitude was so high that the aircraft could not decelerate.

Testing revealed that a nose-wheel steering augmentation system, connecting with the yaw damper, was necessary to counteract the destabilising effect produced by deploying the thrust reverser during the landing roll.

From 1967 until 1984 Soviet KGB agents were provided details on the Tornado by the head of the West German Messerschmitt-Bölkow-Blohm planning department, Manfred Rotsch.

Two prototypes were lost in accidents, both of which had been caused by pilot error leading to two ground collision incidents; a third Tornado prototype was seriously damaged by an incident involving pilot-induced pitch oscillation. During the type's development, aircraft designers of the era were beginning to incorporate features such as more sophisticated stability augmentation systems and autopilots. Aircraft such as the Tornado and the General Dynamics F-16 Fighting Falcon made use of these new technologies. Failure testing of the Tornado's triplex analogue command and stability augmentation system (CSAS) was conducted on a series of realistic flight control rigs; the variable-sweep wings in combination with varying, and frequently very heavy, payloads complicated the clearance process.

=== Production ===
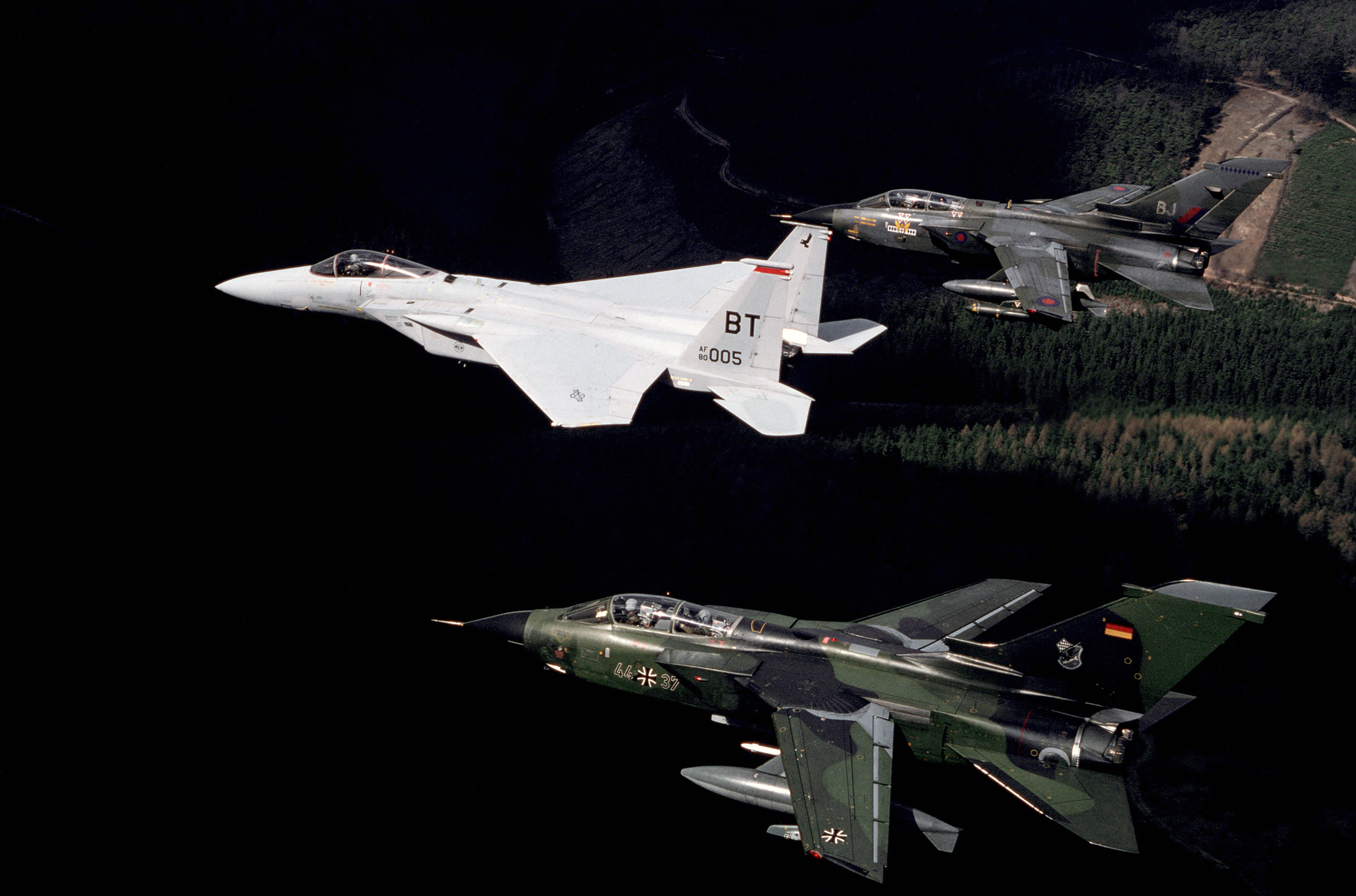
A USAF F-15C flanked by Luftwaffe (bottom) and RAF (top) Tornados in 1987

The contract for the Batch 1 aircraft was signed on 29 July 1976. The first flight of a production aircraft was on 10 July 1979 by ZA319 at BAe Warton. The first aircraft were delivered to the RAF and German Air Force on 5 and 6 June 1979 respectively. The first Italian Tornado was delivered on 25 September 1981. On 29 January 1981, the Tri-National Tornado Training Establishment (TTTE) officially opened at RAF Cottesmore, remaining active in training pilots from all operating nations until 31 March 1999. The 500th Tornado to be produced was delivered to West Germany on 19 December 1987.

Export customers were sought after West Germany withdrew its objections to exporting the aircraft; Saudi Arabia was the only export customer of the Tornado. The agreement to purchase the Tornado was part of the Al-Yamamah arms deal between British Aerospace and the Saudi government. Oman had committed to purchasing eight Tornado F2s and the equipment to operate them for a total value of £250 million in August 1985, but cancelled the order in 1990 due to financial difficulties.

During the 1970s, Australia considered joining the MRCA programme to find a replacement for their ageing Dassault Mirage IIIs; ultimately the McDonnell Douglas F/A-18 Hornet was selected to meet the requirement. Canada similarly opted for the F/A-18 after considering the Tornado. Japan considered the Tornado in the 1980s, along with the F-16 and F/A-18, before selecting the Mitsubishi F-2. In the 1990s, both Taiwan and South Korea expressed interest in acquiring a small number of Tornado ECR aircraft. In 2001, EADS proposed a Tornado ECR variant with a greater electronic warfare capability for Australia.

Production came to an end in 1998; the last batch of aircraft produced going to the Royal Saudi Air Force, who had ordered a total of 96 IDS Tornados. In June 2011, it was announced that the Tornado fleet had flown collectively over one million flying hours. Aviation author Jon Lake noted that "The Trinational Panavia Consortium produced just short of 1,000 Tornados, making it one of the most successful postwar bomber programs". In 2008, AirForces Monthly called the Tornado: "For more than a quarter of a century ... the most important military aircraft in Western Europe."

== Design ==
=== Overview ===
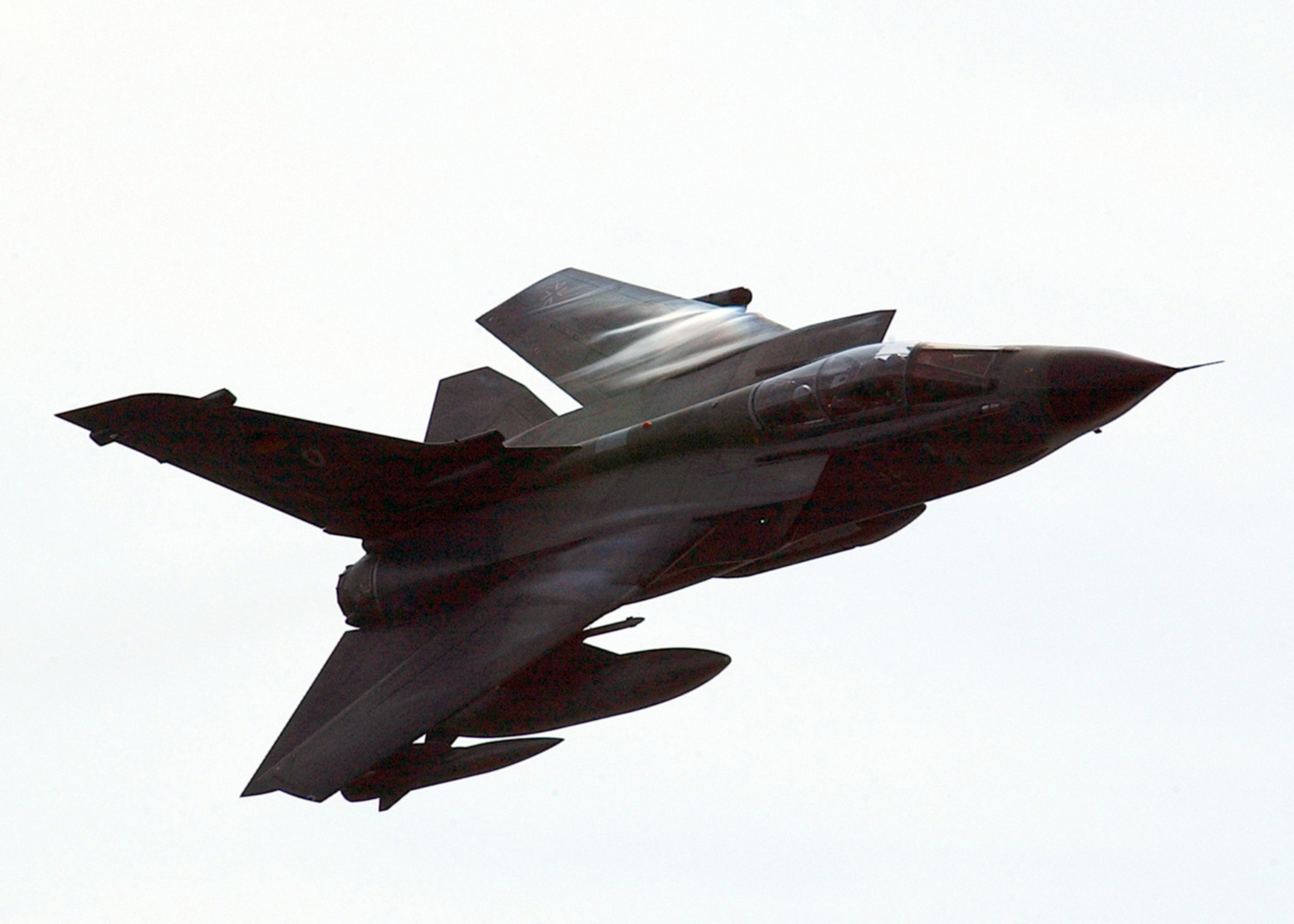
Flyover of a German Navy Tornado during a training exercise in 2003

The Panavia Tornado is a multirole, twin-engined aircraft designed to excel at low-level penetration of enemy defences. The mission envisaged during the Cold War was the delivery of conventional and nuclear weapons on the invading forces of the Warsaw Pact countries of Eastern Europe; this dictated several significant features of the design. Variable wing geometry allowed for minimal drag during the low-level dash towards a well-prepared enemy. Advanced navigation and flight computers, including the then-innovative fly-by-wire system, greatly reduced the workload of the pilot during low-level flight and eased control of the aircraft. For long range missions, the Tornado has a retractable refuelling probe.

As a multirole aircraft, the Tornado is capable of undertaking more mission profiles than the anticipated strike mission; various operators replaced multiple aircraft types with the Tornado as a common type – the use of dedicated single role aircraft for specialist purposes such as battlefield reconnaissance, maritime patrol duties, or dedicated electronic countermeasures (ECM) were phased out – either by standard Tornados or modified variants, such as the Tornado ECR. The most extensive modification from the base Tornado design was the Tornado ADV, which was stretched and armed with long range anti-aircraft missiles to serve in the interceptor role.

Tornado operators have undertaken various life extension and upgrade programmes to keep their Tornado fleets as viable frontline aircraft. With these upgrades the Panavia Tornado is still in service as of 2026, more than 50 years after the first prototype took flight.

=== Variable-sweep wing ===
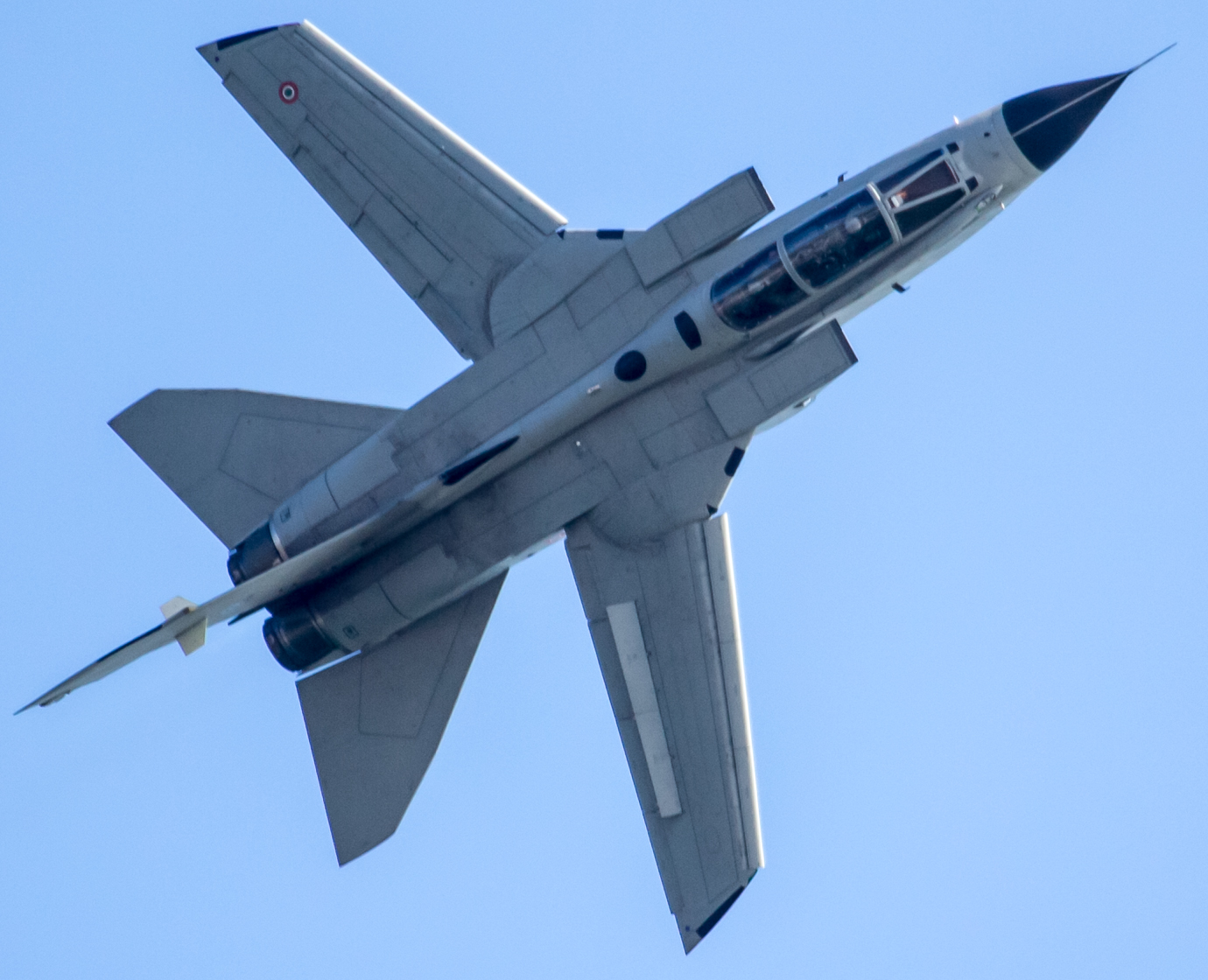
Deployed swing wings

In order for the Tornado to perform well as a low-level supersonic strike aircraft, it was considered necessary for it to possess good high-speed and low-speed flight characteristics. To achieve high-speed performance, a swept or delta wing is typically adopted, but these wing designs are inefficient at low speeds. To operate at both high and low speeds with great effectiveness, the Tornado uses a variable-sweep wing. The swing-wing was used by the older American General Dynamics F-111 Aardvark strike fighter, and the Soviet Mikoyan-Gurevich MiG-23 fighter for example. The smaller Tornado has many similarities with the F-111, however the Tornado differs in being a multi-role aircraft with more advanced onboard systems and avionics.

The amount of wing sweep (i.e. the angle of the wings in relation to the fuselage) is selected in flight by the pilot. Sweep angles can be chosen between 25 degrees and 67 degrees with a speed range for each angle. Some Tornado ADVs were outfitted with an automatic wing-sweep system to reduce pilot workload. When the wings are swept back, the exposed wing area is lowered and drag is significantly decreased, which is conducive to performing high-speed low-level flight. The weapons pylons pivot with the angle of the variable-sweep wings so that the stores point in the direction of flight and do not hinder any wing positions.

In development, significant attention was given to the Tornado's short-field take-off and landing (STOL) performance. Germany, in particular, encouraged this design aspect. For shorter take-off and landing distances, the Tornado can sweep its wings forwards to the 25-degree position, and deploy its full-span flaps and leading edge slats to allow the aircraft to fly at lower speeds. These features, in combination with the thrust reverser-equipped engines, give the Tornado excellent low-speed handling and landing characteristics.

=== Avionics ===
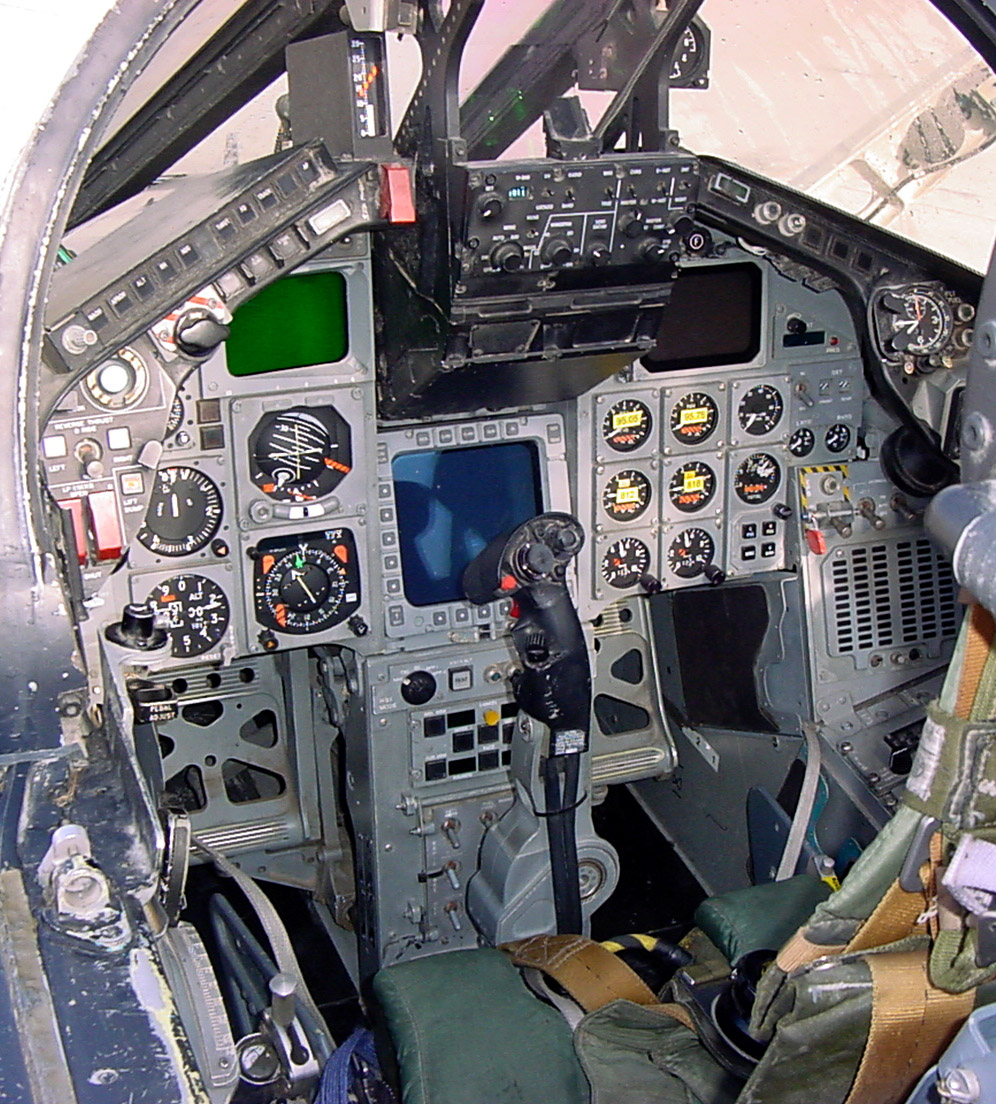
Forward cockpit of an RAF Tornado GR.4

The Tornado features a tandem-seat cockpit, crewed by a pilot and a navigator/weapons officer; both electromechanical and electro-optical controls are used to fly the aircraft and manage its systems. An array of dials and switches are mounted on either side of a centrally placed CRT monitor, controlling the navigational, communications, and weapons-control computers. BAE Systems developed the Tornado Advanced Radar Display Information System (TARDIS), a 32.5-centimetre (12.8 in) multi-function display, to replace the rear cockpit's Combined Radar and Projected Map Display; the RAF began installing TARDIS on the GR4 fleet in 2004.

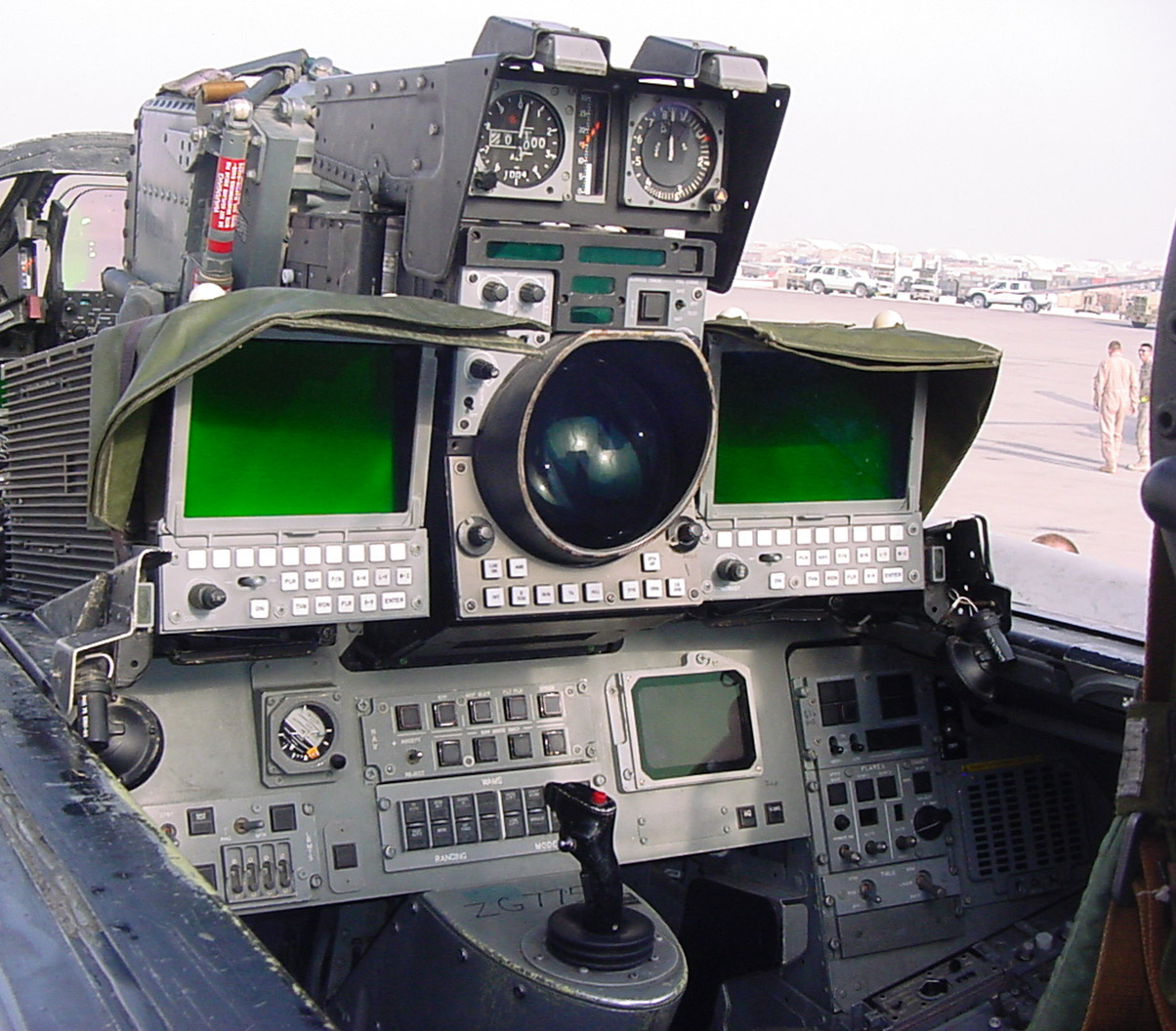
Aft cockpit of an RAF Tornado GR.4

The primary flight controls of the Tornado are a fly-by-wire hybrid, consisting of an analogue quadruplex Command and Stability Augmentation System (CSAS) connected to a digital Autopilot & Flight Director System (AFDS). In addition a level of mechanical reversion capacity was retained to safeguard against potential failure. To enhance pilot awareness, artificial feel was built into the flight controls, such as the centrally located stick. Because the Tornado's variable wings enable the aircraft to drastically alter its flight envelope, the artificial responses adjust automatically to wing profile changes and other changes to flight attitude. As a large variety of munitions and stores can be outfitted, the resulting changes to the aircraft's flight dynamics are routinely compensated for by the flight stability system.

The Tornado incorporates a combined navigation/attack Doppler radar that simultaneously scans for targets and conducts fully automated terrain-following for low-level flight operations. Being able to conduct all-weather hands-off low-level flight was considered one of the core advantages of the Tornado. The Tornado ADV had a different radar system to other variants, designated AI.24 Foxhunter, as it is designed for air defence operations. It was capable of tracking up to 20 targets at ranges of up to 160 kilometres (100 mi). The Tornado was one of the earliest aircraft to be fitted with a digital data bus for data transmission. A Link 16 JTIDS integration on the F3 variant enabled the exchange of radar and other sensory information with nearby friendly aircraft.

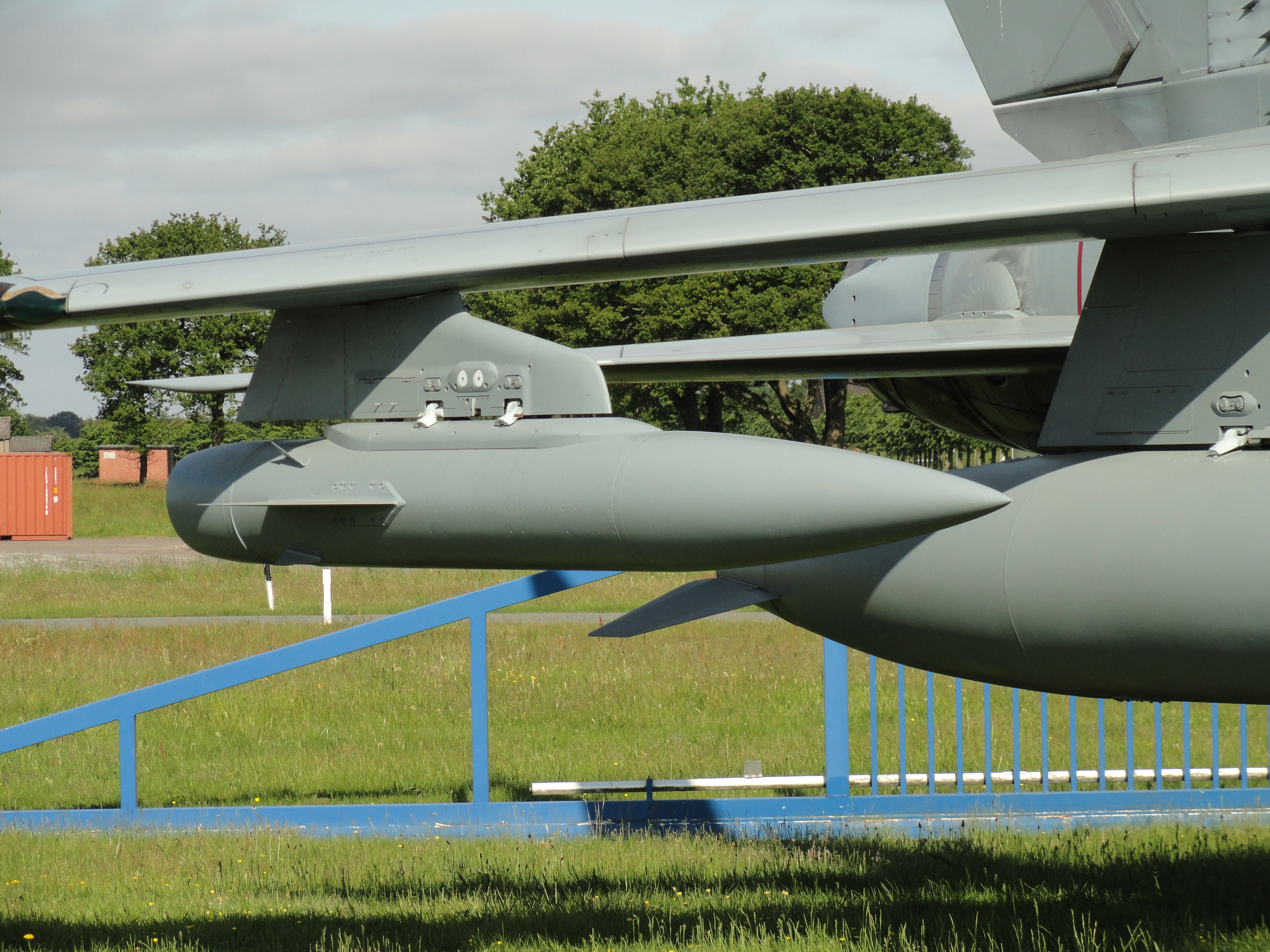
German Air Force Tornado 44+96, BOZ countermeasure pod

Some Tornado variants carry different avionics and equipment, depending on their mission. The Tornado ECR operated by Germany and Italy is devoted to Suppression of Enemy Air Defences (SEAD) missions. The Tornado ECR is equipped with an emitter-locator system (ELS) to detect radar use. German ECRs have a Honeywell infrared imaging system for reconnaissance flights. RAF and RSAF Tornados have the Laser Range Finder and Marked Target Seekers (LRMTS) for targeting laser-guided munitions. In 1991, the RAF introduced the Thermal Imaging and Laser Designator (TIALD), allowing Tornado GR1s to laser-designate their own targets.

The GR1A and GR4A reconnaissance variants were equipped with the Tornado Infrared Reconnaissance System (TIRRS), consisting of one SLIR (Sideways Looking Infra Red) sensor on each side of the fuselage forward of the engine intakes to capture oblique images, and a single IRLS (InfraRed LineScan) sensor mounted on the fuselage's underside to provide vertical images. TIRRS recorded images on six S-VHS video tapes. The newer RAPTOR reconnaissance pod replaced the built-in TIRRS system.

=== Armament and equipment ===
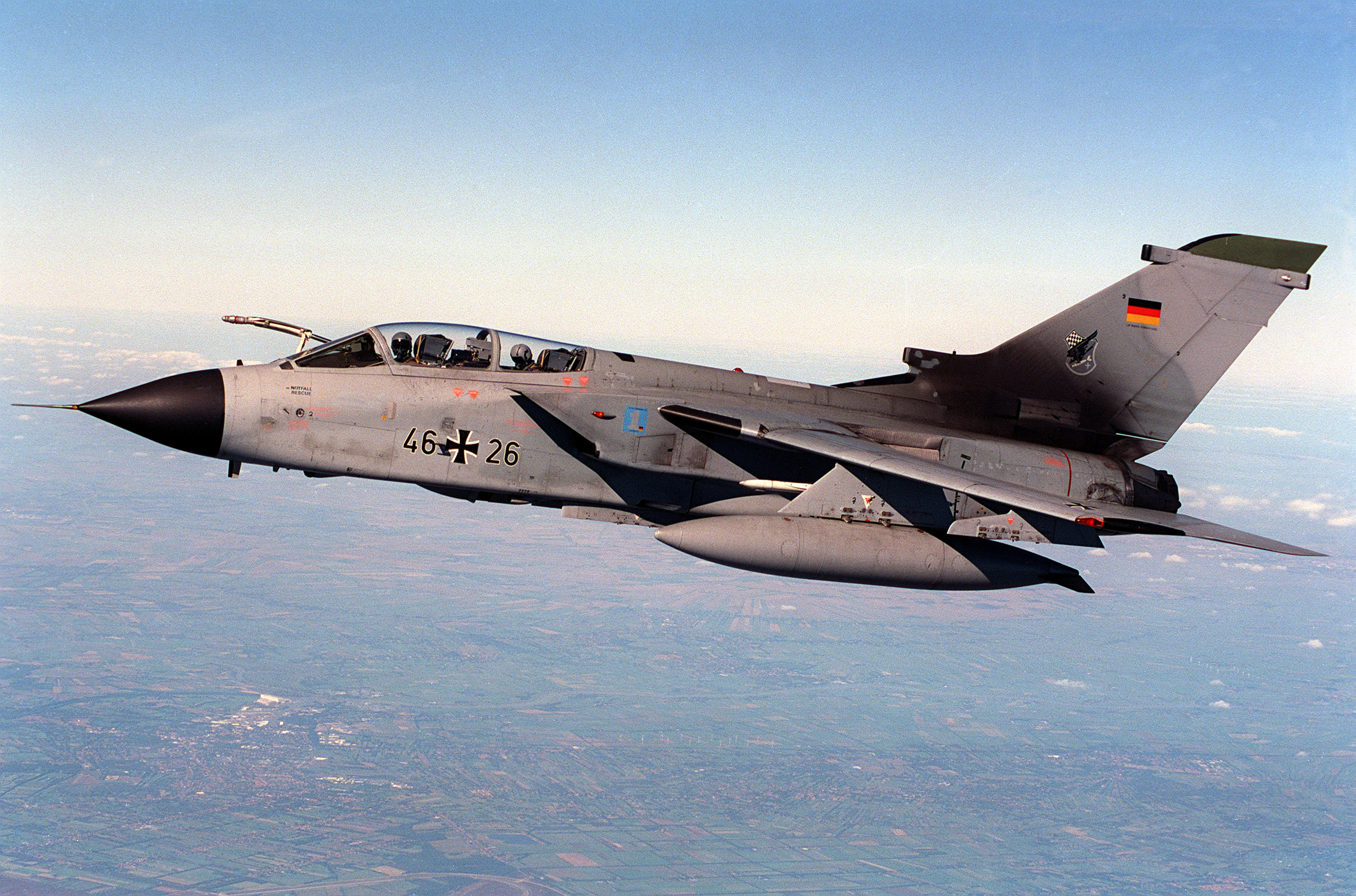
German Air Force Tornado ECR 46+26, queuing to be refuelled by a USAF KC-135 Stratotanker in September 1997

The Tornado is cleared to carry the majority of air-launched weapons in the NATO inventory, including various unguided and laser-guided bombs, anti-ship and anti-radiation missiles, as well as specialised weapons such as anti-personnel mines and anti-runway munitions. To improve survivability in combat, the Tornado is equipped with onboard countermeasures, ranging from flare and chaff dispensers to electronic countermeasure pods that can be mounted under the wings. Underwing fuel tanks and a buddy store aerial refuelling system that allows one Tornado to refuel another are available to extend the aircraft's range.

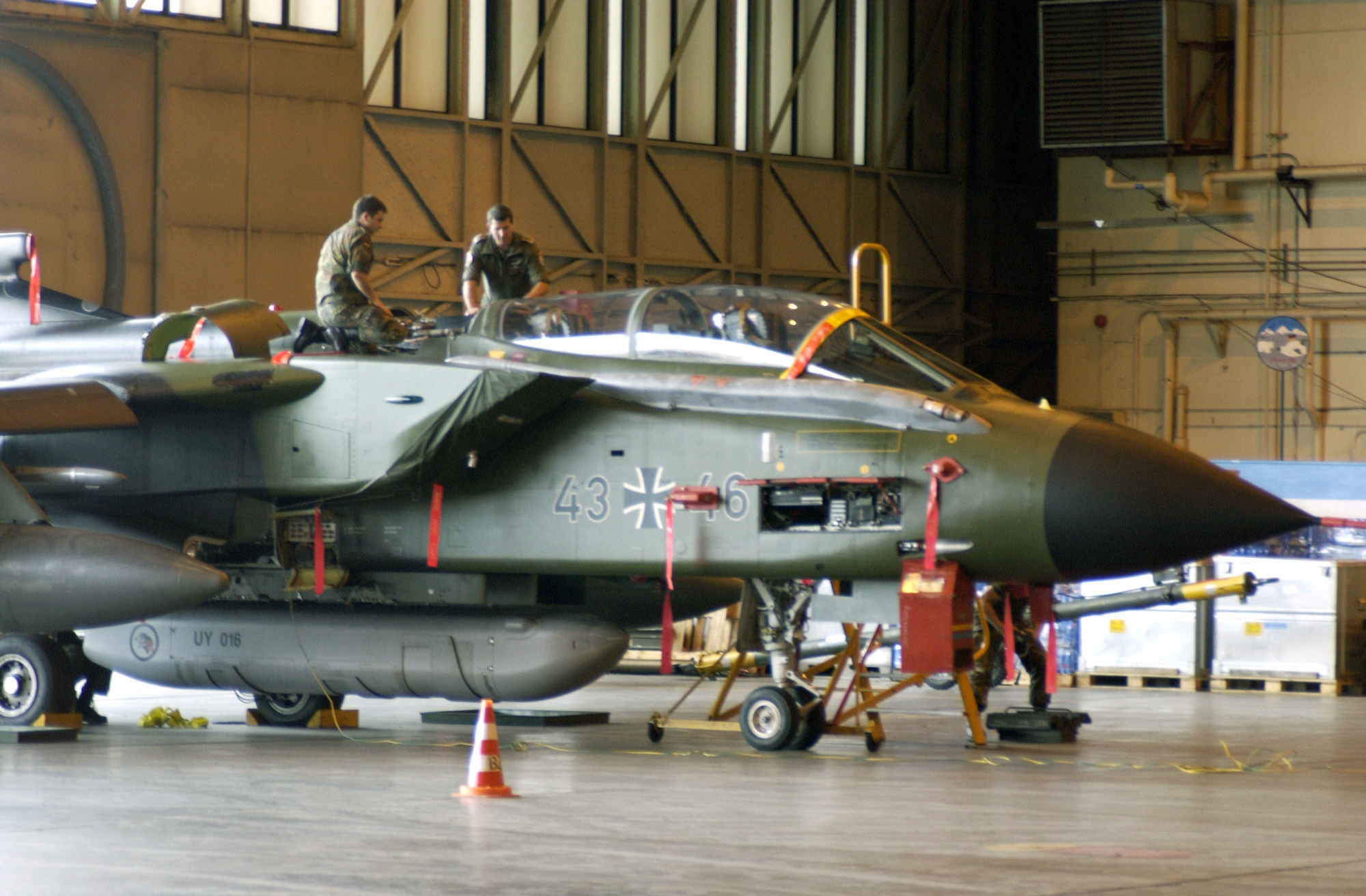
A German Air Force Tornado IDS undergoing maintenance in July 2004

In the decades since the Tornado's introduction, all of the Tornado operators have undertaken various upgrade and modification programmes to allow new weapons to be used by their squadrons. Amongst the armaments that the Tornado has been adapted to deploy are the Enhanced Paveway and Joint Direct Attack Munition bombs, and modern cruise missiles such as the Taurus and Storm Shadow missiles. These upgrades have increased the Tornado's capabilities and combat accuracy. Precision weapons such as cruise missiles have replaced older munitions such as cluster bombs.

Strike variants have a limited air-to-air capability with AIM-9 Sidewinder or AIM-132 ASRAAM air-to-air missiles (AAMs). The Tornado ADV was outfitted with beyond visual range AAMs such as the Skyflash and AIM-120 AMRAAM missiles. The Tornado is armed with two 27 mm (1.063 in) Mauser BK-27 revolver cannon internally mounted underneath the fuselage; the Tornado ADV was only armed with one cannon. When the RAF GR1 aircraft were converted to GR4, the FLIR sensor replaced the left hand cannon, leaving only one; the GR1A reconnaissance variant gave up both its guns to make space for the sideways looking infra-red sensors. The Mauser BK-27 was developed specifically for the Tornado, but has since been used on several other European fighters, such as the Dassault/Dornier Alpha Jet, Saab JAS 39 Gripen, and Eurofighter Typhoon.

The Tornado is capable of delivering air-launched nuclear weapons. In 1979, Britain considered replacing its Polaris submarines with either the Trident submarines or the Tornado as the main bearer of its nuclear deterrent. Although the UK proceeded with Trident, several Tornado squadrons based in Germany were assigned to SACEUR to deter a major Soviet offensive with both conventional and nuclear weapons, namely the WE.177 nuclear bomb, which was retired in 1998. German and Italian Tornados are capable of delivering US B61 nuclear bombs, which are made available through NATO.

=== Engine ===
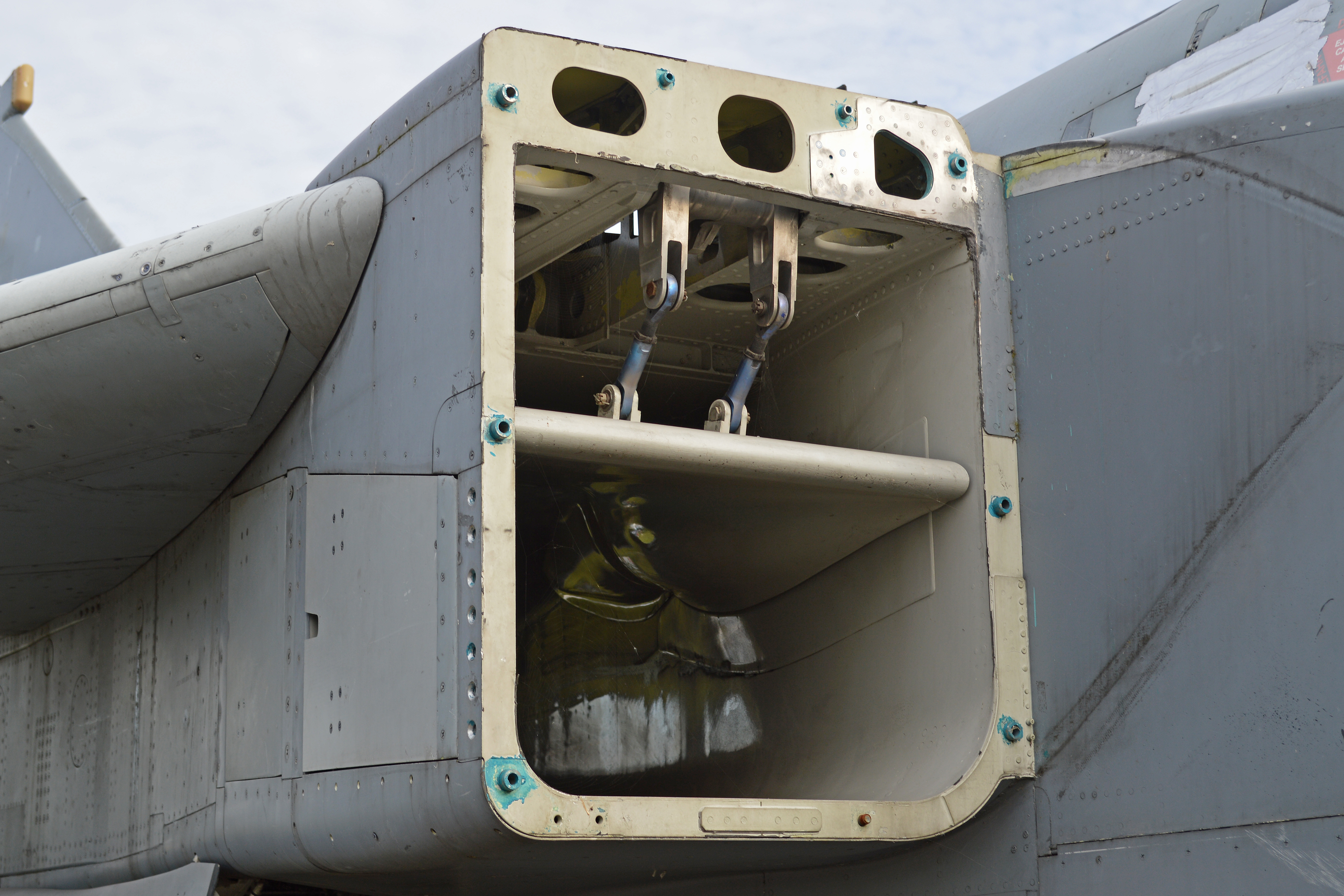
A view inside the intake with its front half removed. It shows the second of 2 ramps which move up and down. Their position changes the size of the air passage below the ramp which leads into the engine.

Britain considered the selection of Rolls-Royce to develop the advanced engine for the MRCA to be essential, and was strongly opposed to adopting an engine from an American manufacturer, to the point where the UK might have withdrawn over the issue. In September 1969, Rolls-Royce's RB199 engine was selected to power the MRCA. One advantage over the US competition was that a technology transfer between the partner nations had been agreed; the engine was to be developed and manufactured by a joint company, Turbo-Union. The programme was delayed by Rolls-Royce's entry into receivership in 1971. however the nature of the multinational collaboration process helped avoid major disruption of the Tornado programme. Research from the supersonic airliner Concorde contributed to the development and final design of the RB199 and of the engine control units.

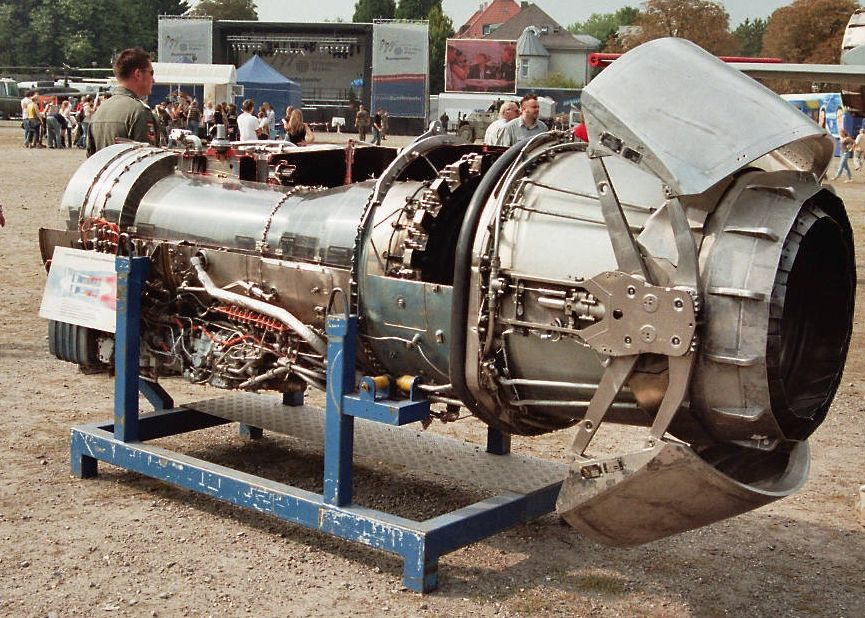
A cutaway display exhibit of an RB199 showing the bypass duct, afterburner fuel nozzles and thrust reverser in mid-travel between stowed and deployed.

Variable intake ramps are used in front of the engine to raise the pressure of the air entering the engine as much as possible at all speeds up to Mach 2. An electrical generator, hydraulic pump and fuel boost pump is mounted on each of two airframe gearboxes, each driven by one engine. The gearboxes are connected so both generators and hydraulic pumps can be driven by a single engine. In case of double-engine, or double-generator, failure, the Tornado has an emergency battery for operating one fuel and one hydraulic pump for up to 13 minutes.

The RB199 is fitted with a thrust reverser to decrease the distance required to land. When the thrust reverser is used a yaw damper is connected to the steering of the nosewheel to provide greater stability.

The first flight of an RB199 took place underneath a Vulcan in April 1973. The maiden flight of the first Tornado prototype, P01, was made in August 1974 and the engine completed its qualification tests in late 1978. The final production standard engine met both reliability and performance standards, though the development cost had been higher than predicted, in part due to the ambitious performance requirements. At the time of the Tornado's introduction to service, the turbine blades had a shorter life than desired, which was rectified by the implementation of design revisions upon early-production engines. Several uprated engines were developed and used on both the majority of Tornado ADVs and Germany's Tornado ECRs. The DECU (Digital Engine Control Unit) is the current engine control unit for RB199 engines superseding the analogue MECU (Main Engine Control Unit) also known as CUE.

=== Upgrades ===
Being designed for low-level operations, the Tornado required modification to perform in medium level operations that the RAF adopted in the 1990s. The RAF's GR1 fleet was extensively re-manufactured as Tornado GR4s. Upgrades on Tornado GR4s included a forward looking infrared, a wide-angle HUD (head-up display), improved cockpit displays, NVG (night vision devices) capabilities, new avionics, and a Global Positioning System (GPS) receiver. The upgrade eased the integration of new weapons and sensors which were purchased in parallel, including the Storm Shadow cruise missile, the Brimstone anti-tank missile, Paveway III laser-guided bombs and the RAPTOR reconnaissance pod. The first flight of a Tornado GR4 was on 4 April 1997. The RAF accepted its first delivery on 31 October 1997 and deliveries were completed in 2003. In 2005, the RSAF opted to have their Tornado IDSs undergo a series of upgrades to become equivalent to the RAF's GR4 configuration. On 21 December 2007 BAE signed a £210m contract for CUSP, the Capability Upgrade Strategy (Pilot). This project would see RAF GR4/4A improved in two phases, starting with the integration of the Paveway IV bomb and a communications upgrade, followed by a new tactical datalink in Phase B.

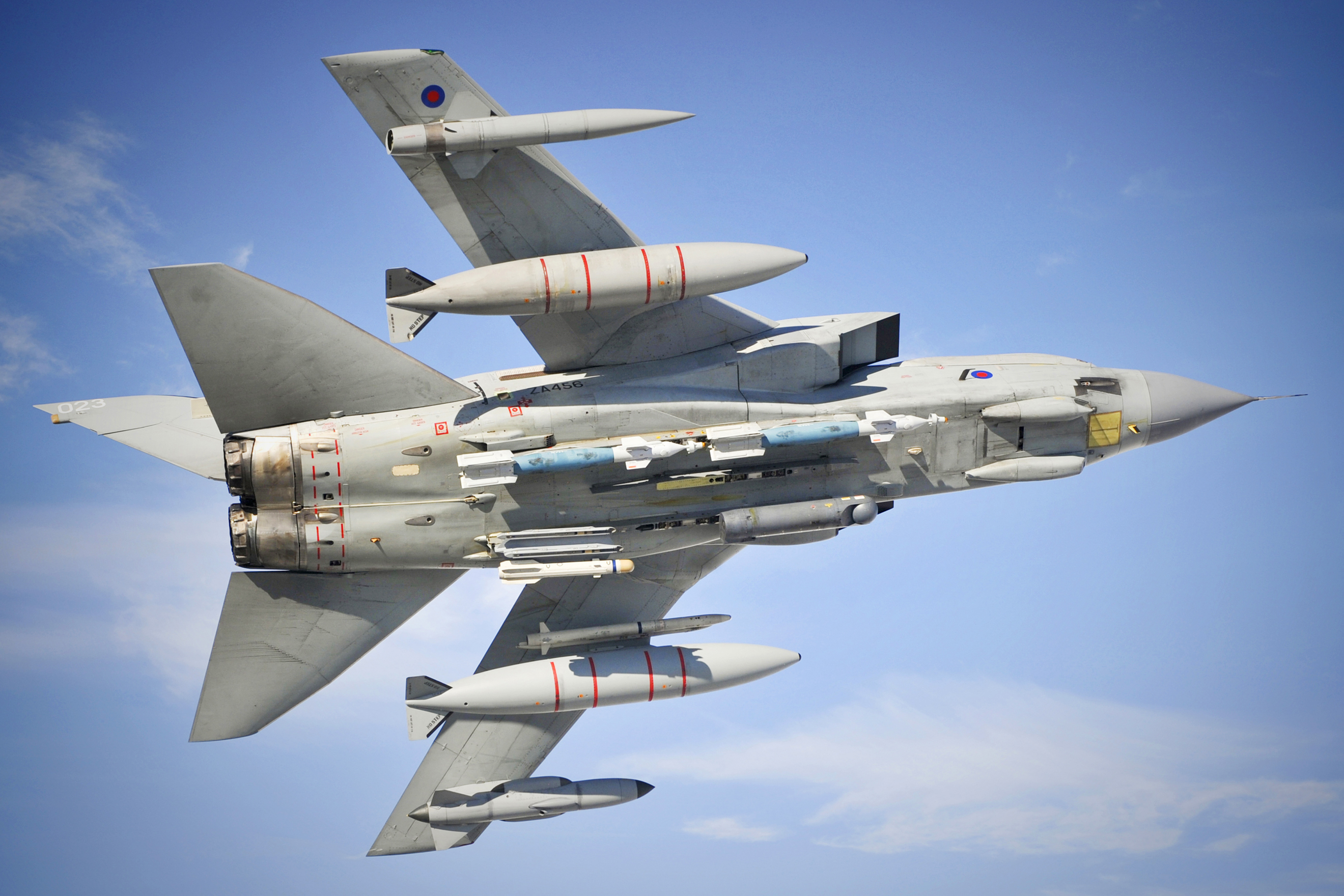
RAF GR4 of No. 9 Squadron showing a payload which includes Paveway, Brimstone and Litening pod.

Beginning in 2000, German IDS and ECR Tornados received the ASSTA 1 (Avionics System Software Tornado in Ada) upgrade. ASSTA 1 involved a replacement weapons computer, new GPS and Laser Inertial navigation systems. The new computer allowed the integration of the HARM missiles and Taurus KEPD 350 missiles, the Rafael Litening II laser designator pod and Paveway III laser-guided bombs. The ASSTA 2 upgrade began in 2005, primarily consisting of several new digital avionics systems and a new ECM suite; these upgrades are to be only applied to 85 Tornados (20 ECRs and 65 IDSs), as the Tornado is being replaced in part by the Eurofighter Typhoon. The ASSTA 3 upgrade programme, started in 2008, will introduce support for the laser-targeted Joint Direct Attack Munition along with further software changes.

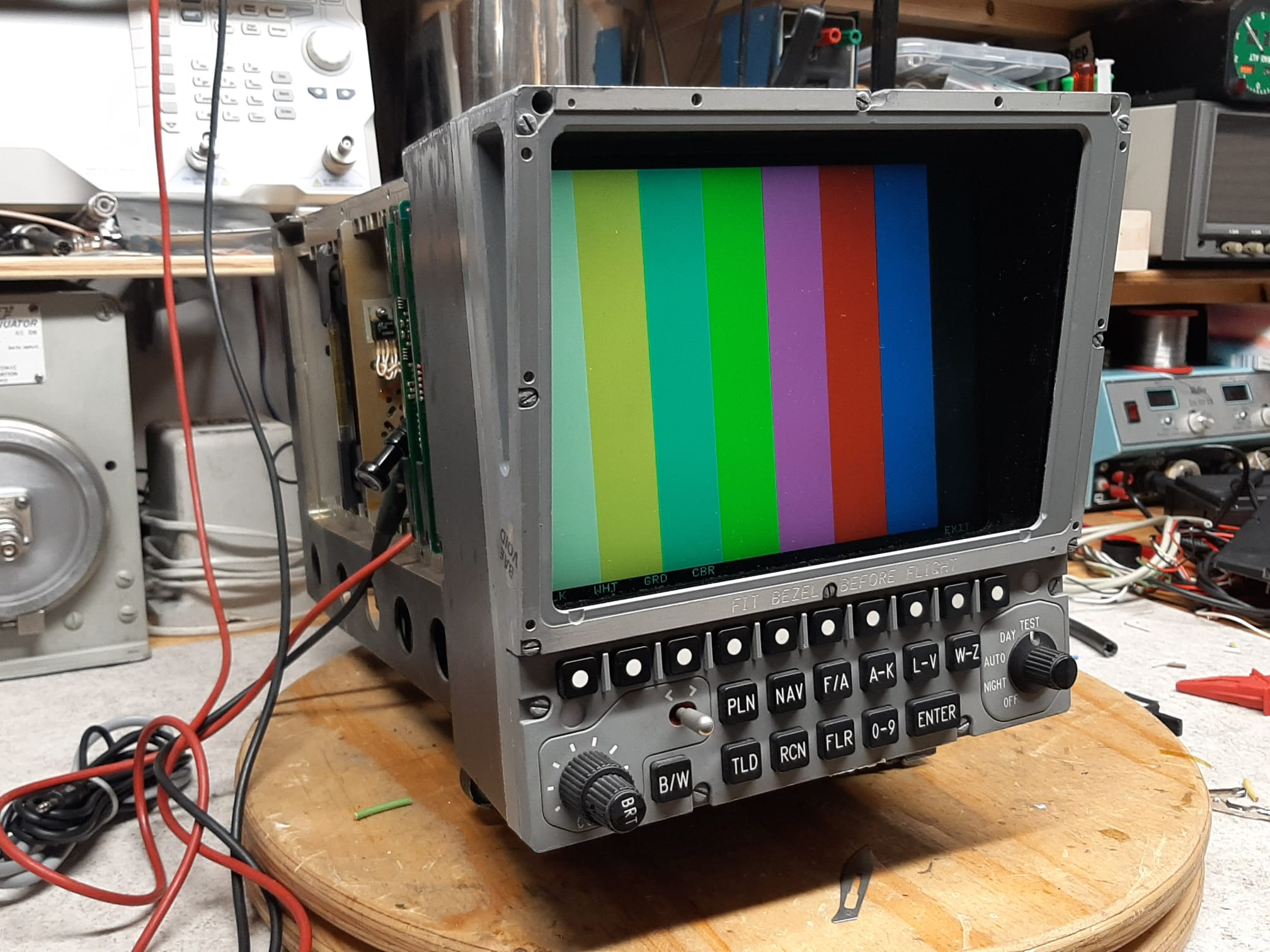
An AMLCD TV TAB DU in test mode showing color bars. The bezel is removed to allow a wider view angle.

In January 2016, Bild newspaper stated that the newest upgrade of the ASSTA suite to version 3.1, which includes colour multifunctional LCD screens in place of monochrome CRT displays, is interfering with helmet-mounted night-vision optical displays worn by pilots, rendering German Tornado bombers deployed to Syria useless for night missions. The defence ministry admitted that bright cockpit lights could be a distraction for pilots, and said that the solution will be implemented in a few weeks, but denied the need to fly night missions in Syria.

The TV TAB displays are used for route planning, the forward-looking infra-red (FLIR) sensors, targeting pods such as TIALD and CLDP (Convertible Laser Designator Pod). The original MRCA TV TAB DU navigation display (part number V22.498.90) has a green CRT as the picture source.

BAE Systems announced that, in December 2013, it had test-flown a Tornado equipped with parts made by 3D printing. The parts included a protective cover for the radio, a landing-gear guard and air-intake door support struts. The test demonstrated the feasibility of making replacement parts quickly and cheaply at the air base hosting the Tornado. The company claimed that, with some parts costing less than £100 to make, 3D printing had saved more than £300,000, which potentially could reach more than £1.2 million by 2017.

== Operational history ==
=== German Air Force (Luftwaffe) ===
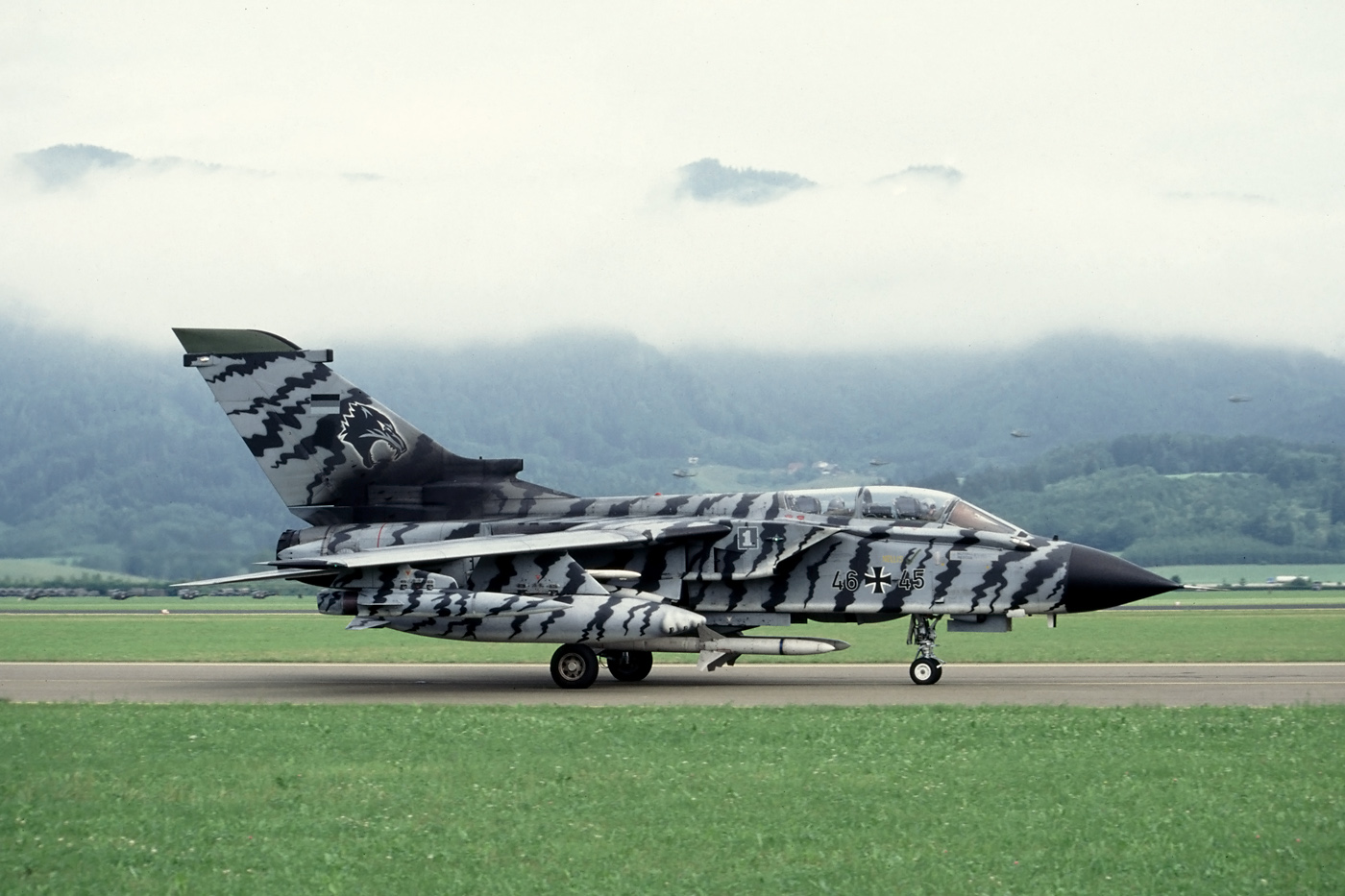
Tornado ECR arrives in Austria for an air show, 1997

The first Tornado prototype made its first flight on 14 August 1974 from Ingolstadt Manching Airport, in West Germany. Deliveries of production Tornados began on 27 July 1979. The total number of Tornados delivered to the German Air Force was 247, including 35 ECR variants. Originally Tornados equipped five fighter-bomber wings (Geschwader), with one tactical conversion unit and four front-line wings, replacing the Lockheed F-104 Starfighter. When one of the two Tornado wings of the German Navy was disbanded in 1994, its aircraft were used to re-equip a Luftwaffe's reconnaissance wing formerly equipped with McDonnell Douglas RF-4E Phantoms.

14 German Tornados undertook combat operations as a part of NATO's campaign during the Bosnian War. The Tornados, operating from Piacenza, Italy, flew reconnaissance missions to survey damage inflicted by previous strikes and to scout new targets. These reconnaissance missions were reportedly responsible for a significant improvement in target selection throughout the campaign.

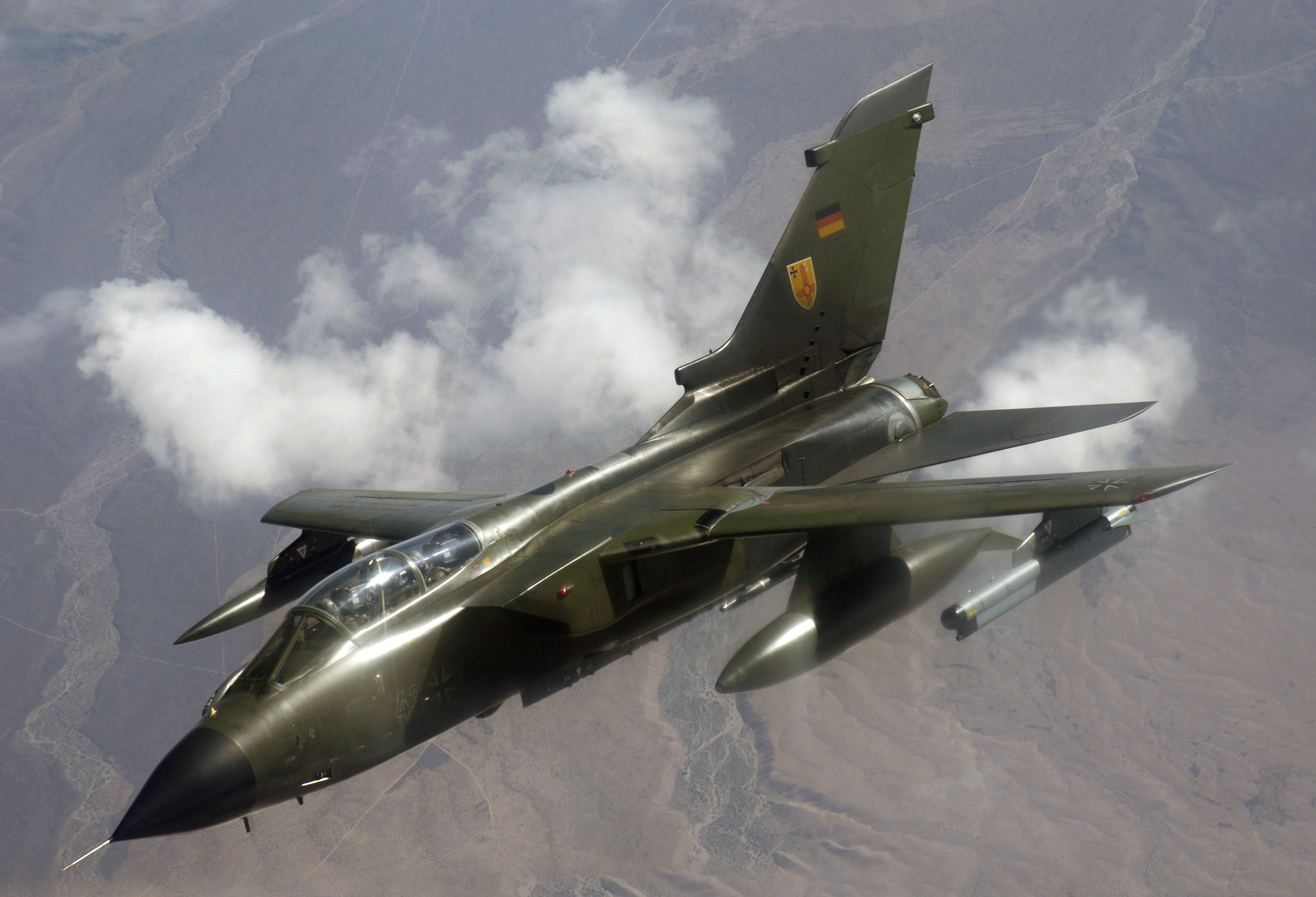
A German Air Force Tornado IDS 43+13 flying above Nevada, US, 2007

In 1999, German Tornados participated in Operation Allied Force, NATO airstrikes against the Federal Republic of Yugoslavia during the Kosovo War. This was Germany's first offensive air mission since World War II. The ECR aircraft escorted various allies' aircraft while carrying several AGM-88 HARM missiles to counter attempted use of radar against the allied aircraft. During the Kosovo hostilities, Germany's IDS Tornados routinely conducted reconnaissance flights to identify both enemy ground forces and civilian refugees within Yugoslavia. The German Tornados flew 2108 hours and 446 sorties, firing 236 HARM missiles at hostile targets.

In June 2007, a pair of Luftwaffe Tornados flew reconnaissance missions over an anti-globalisation demonstration during the 33rd G8 summit in Heiligendamm. Following the mission, the German Defence Ministry admitted one aircraft had broken the minimum flying altitude and that mistakes were made in the handling of security of the summit.

In 2007, a detachment of six Tornados of the Aufklärungsgeschwader 51 "Immelmann" (51st reconnaissance wing) were deployed to Mazar-i-Sharif, Northern Afghanistan, to support NATO forces. The decision to send Tornados to Afghanistan was controversial: one political party launched an unsuccessful legal bid to block the deployment as unconstitutional. In support of the Afghanistan mission, improvements in the Tornado's reconnaissance equipment were accelerated; enhancing the Tornado's ability to detect hidden improvised explosive devices (IEDs). The German Tornados were withdrawn from Afghanistan in November 2010.

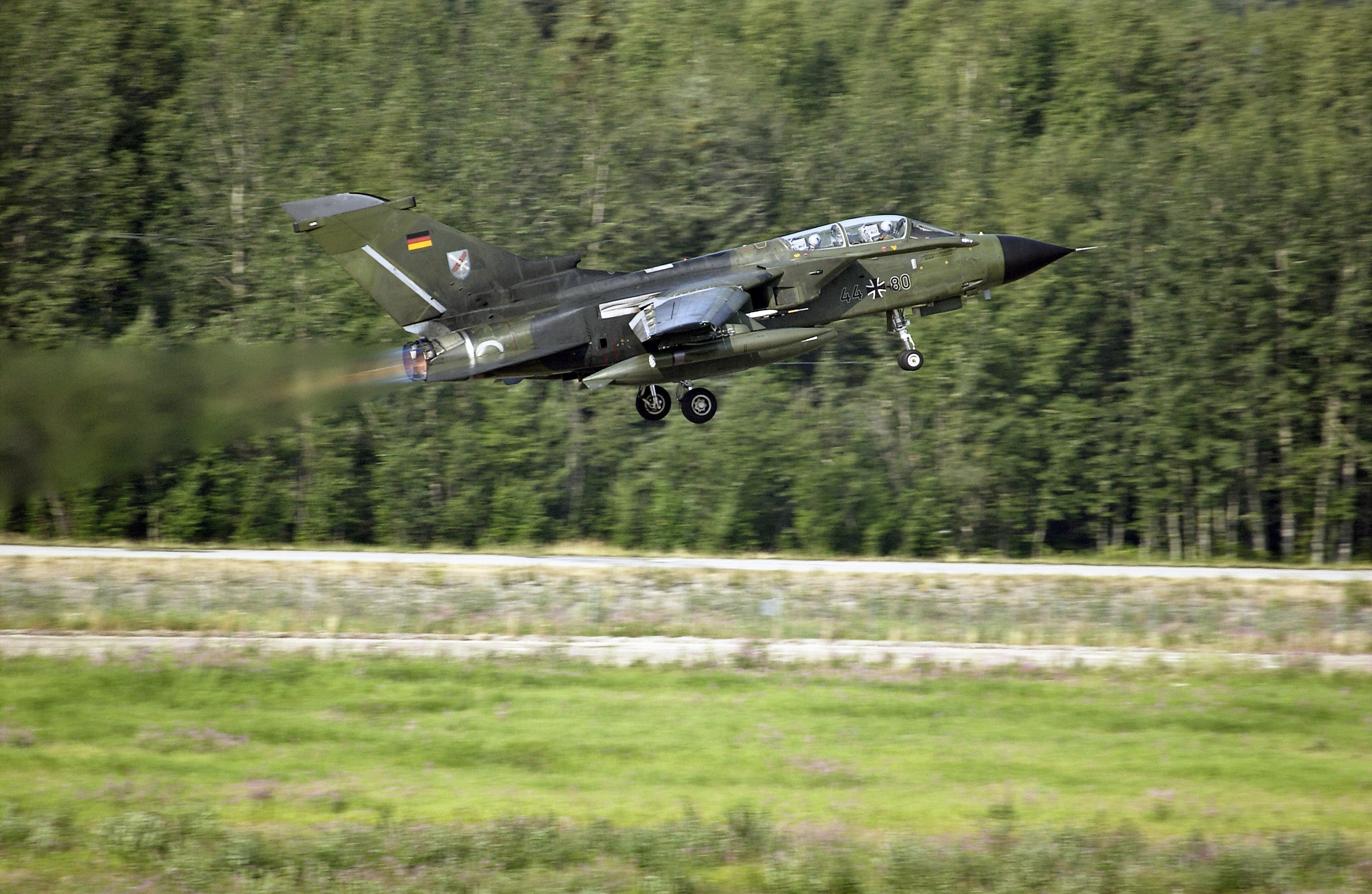
A Luftwaffe Tornado 44+80 of Jagdbombergeschwader 31 taking off from Eielson Air Force Base, Alaska, in 2004

Defence cuts announced in March 2003 resulted in the decision to retire 90 Tornados from service with the Luftwaffe. This led to a reduction in its Tornado strength to four wings by September 2005. On 13 January 2004, the then German Defence Minister Peter Struck announced further major changes to the German armed forces. A major part of this announcement was the plan to cut the German fighter fleet from 426 in early 2004 to 265 by 2015. The German Tornado force was to be reduced to 85, with the type expected to remain in service with the Luftwaffe until 2025. The aircraft being retained have been undergoing a service life extension programme. Currently, the Luftwaffe operates Tornados with Tactical Wings Taktisches Luftwaffengeschwader 33 in Cochem/Büchel Air Base, Rhineland-Palatinate and with Taktisches Luftwaffengeschwader 51 "Immelmann" in Jagel, Schleswig-Holstein.

German Tornado aircrew training took place at Holloman Air Force Base in New Mexico, US from January 1996 at the Taktische Ausbildungskommando der Luftwaffe USA (TaktAusbKdoLw USA Tactical Training Command of the Luftwaffe USA) which was responsible for training both German F-4 Phantom and Tornado crews. In 1999 the training command was renamed as Fliegerisches Ausbildungszentrum der Luftwaffe (FlgAusbZLw Luftwaffe Training Center). In March 2015, Defence Minister Ursula von der Leyen decided to continue this training in Germany. In September 2017, flight training in Holloman for the Tornado was discontinued and transferred to Taktischen Luftwaffengeschwader 51 in Jagel with the US location command dissolved in 2019.

In April 2020, it was reported that the German defence ministry planned to replace its Tornado aircraft with a purchase of 30 Boeing F/A-18E/F Super Hornets, 15 EA-18G Growlers, and 55 Eurofighter Typhoons. The Super Hornet was selected due to its compatibility with nuclear weapons and availability of an electronic attack version. In March 2020, the Super Hornet was not certified for the B61 nuclear bombs, but Dan Gillian, head of Boeing's Super Hornet program, previously stated "We certainly think that we, working with the U.S. government, can meet the German requirements there on the [required] timeline."

In 2021, Airbus offered to replace Luftwaffe's 90 ageing Tornado Interdiction and Strike (IDS) and Electronic Combat Reconnaissance (ECR) aircraft with 85 new Eurofighter Tranche 5 standard from 2030. In 2022, the German defence ministry announced that 35 Lockheed Martin F-35 Lightning IIs will replace the Tornado fleet for nuclear sharing instead of the discussed 30 Boeing Super Hornets.

=== German Navy (Marineflieger) ===
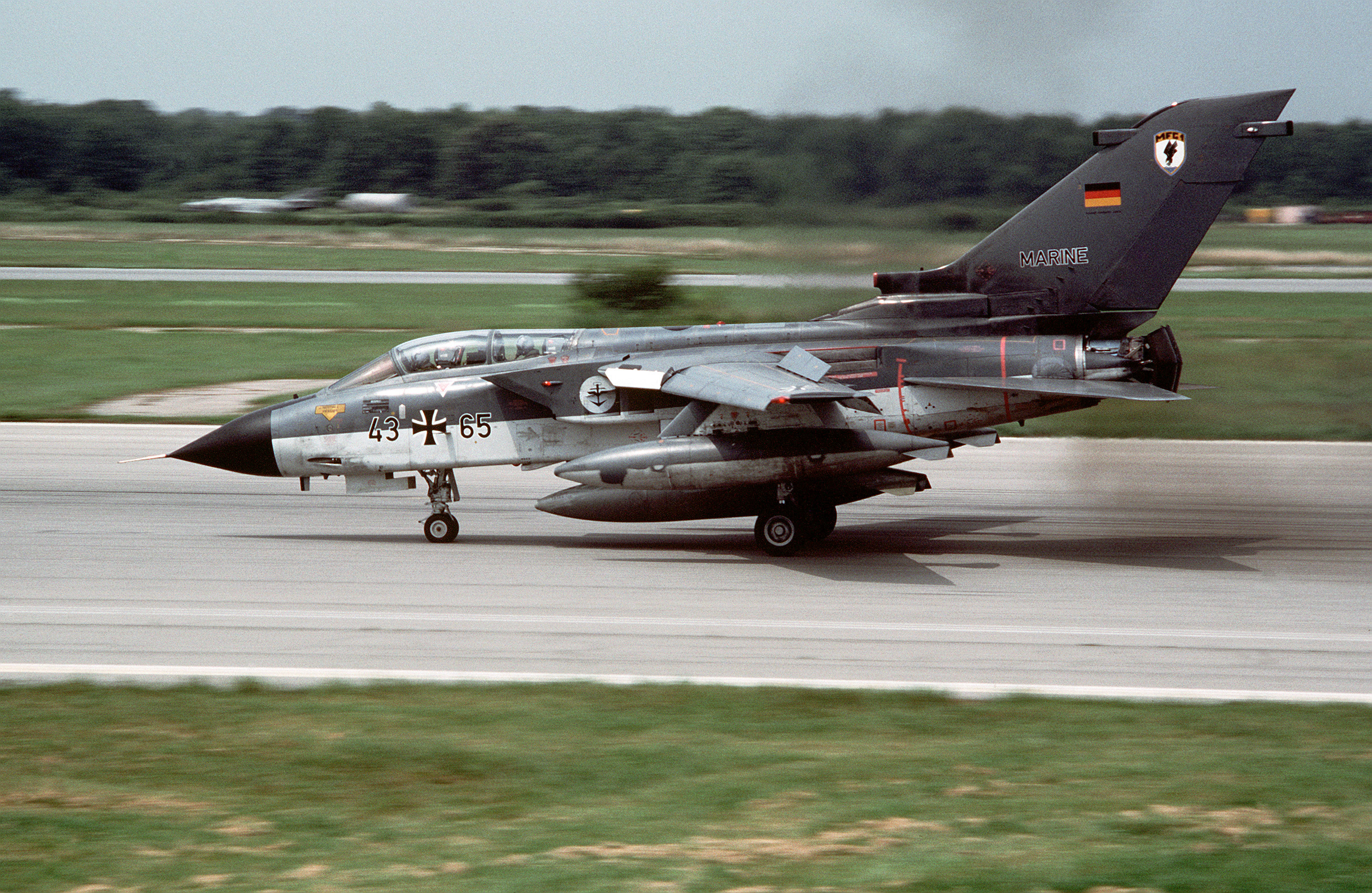
A German Navy Tornado 43+65 landing at NAS Oceana in 1989

In addition to the order made by the Luftwaffe, the German Navy's Marineflieger also received 112 of the IDS variant in the anti-ship and marine reconnaissance roles, again replacing the Starfighter. These Tornados equipped two wings, each with a nominal strength of 48 aircraft. The principal anti-ship weapon was the AS.34 Kormoran anti-ship missile, which were initially supplemented by unguided bombs and BL755 cluster munitions, and later by AGM-88 HARM anti-radar missiles. Pods fitted with panoramic optical cameras and an infrared line scan were carried for the reconnaissance mission.

The end of the Cold War and the signing of the CFE Treaty led Germany to reduce the size of its armed forces, including the number of combat aircraft. To meet this need, one of the Marineflieger's Tornado wings was disbanded on 1 January 1994; its aircraft replaced the Phantoms of a Luftwaffe reconnaissance wing. The second wing was enlarged and continued in the anti-shipping, reconnaissance and anti-radar roles until it was disbanded in 2005 with its aircraft and duties passed on to the Luftwaffe.

=== Italian Air Force (Aeronautica Militare) ===
The first Italian prototype made its maiden flight on 5 December 1975 from Turin. The Aeronautica Militare received 100 Tornado IDSs (known as the A-200 in Italian service). 16 A-200s were subsequently converted to the ECR configuration; the first Italian Tornado ECR (known as the EA-200) was delivered on 27 February 1998. As a stop-gap measure for 10 years the Aeronautica Militare additionally operated 24 Tornado ADVs in the air defence role, which were leased from the RAF to cover the service gap between the retirement of the Lockheed F-104 Starfighter and the introduction of the Eurofighter Typhoon.

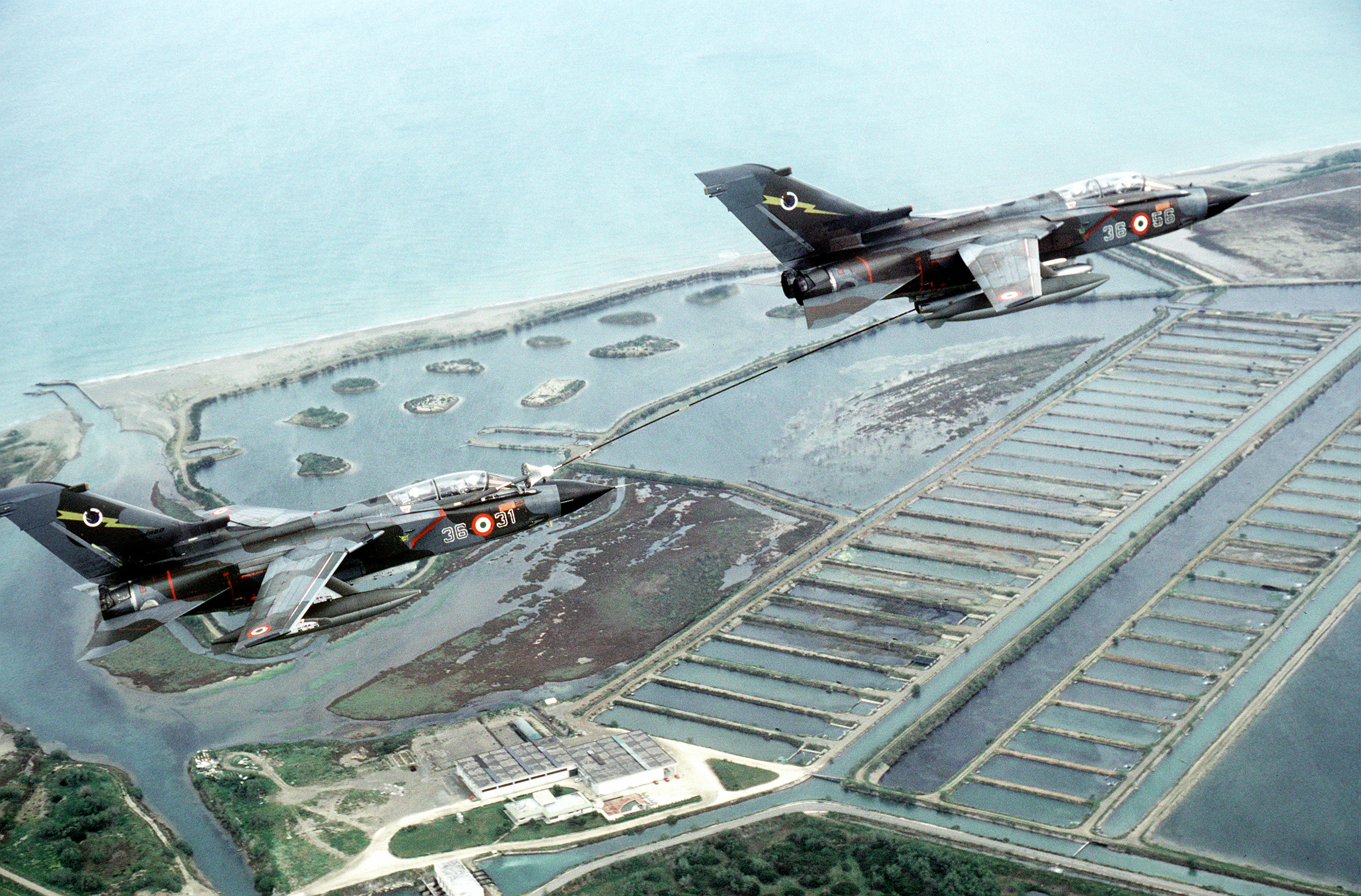
Two Italian A-200 Tornados participating in NATO exercise Dragon Hammer, May 1987

Italian Tornados, along with RAF Tornados, took part in the first Gulf War in 1991. Operazione Locusta saw eight Tornado IDS interdictors deployed from Gioia del Colle, Italy, to Al Dhafra, Abu Dhabi, as part of Italy's contribution to the coalition. During the conflict, one aircraft was lost to Iraqi anti-aircraft fire; the pilots ejected safely and were captured by Iraqi forces. A total of 22 Italian Tornados were deployed in the NATO-organised Operation Allied Force over Kosovo in 1999; the A-200s served in the bombing role while the EA-200s patrolled the combat region, acting to suppress enemy anti-aircraft radars, firing 115 AGM-88 HARM missiles.

In 2000, with delays to the Eurofighter, the Aeronautica Militare began a search for another interim fighter. While the Tornado was considered, any long term extension to the lease would have involved upgrade to RAF CSP standard and thus was not considered cost effective. In February 2001, Italy announced its arrangement to lease 35 F-16s from the United States under the PEACE CAESAR programme. The Aeronautica Militare returned its Tornado ADVs to the RAF, with the final aircraft arriving at RAF St Athan on 7 December 2004. One aircraft was retained for static display purposes at the Italian Air Force Museum.

In July 2002, Italy signed a contract with the Tornado Management Agency (NETMA) and Panavia for the upgrading of 18 A-200s, the first of which was received in 2003. The upgrade introduced improved navigation systems (integrated GPS and laser INS) and the ability to carry new weapons, including the Storm Shadow cruise missile, Joint Direct Attack Munition and Paveway III laser-guided bombs.

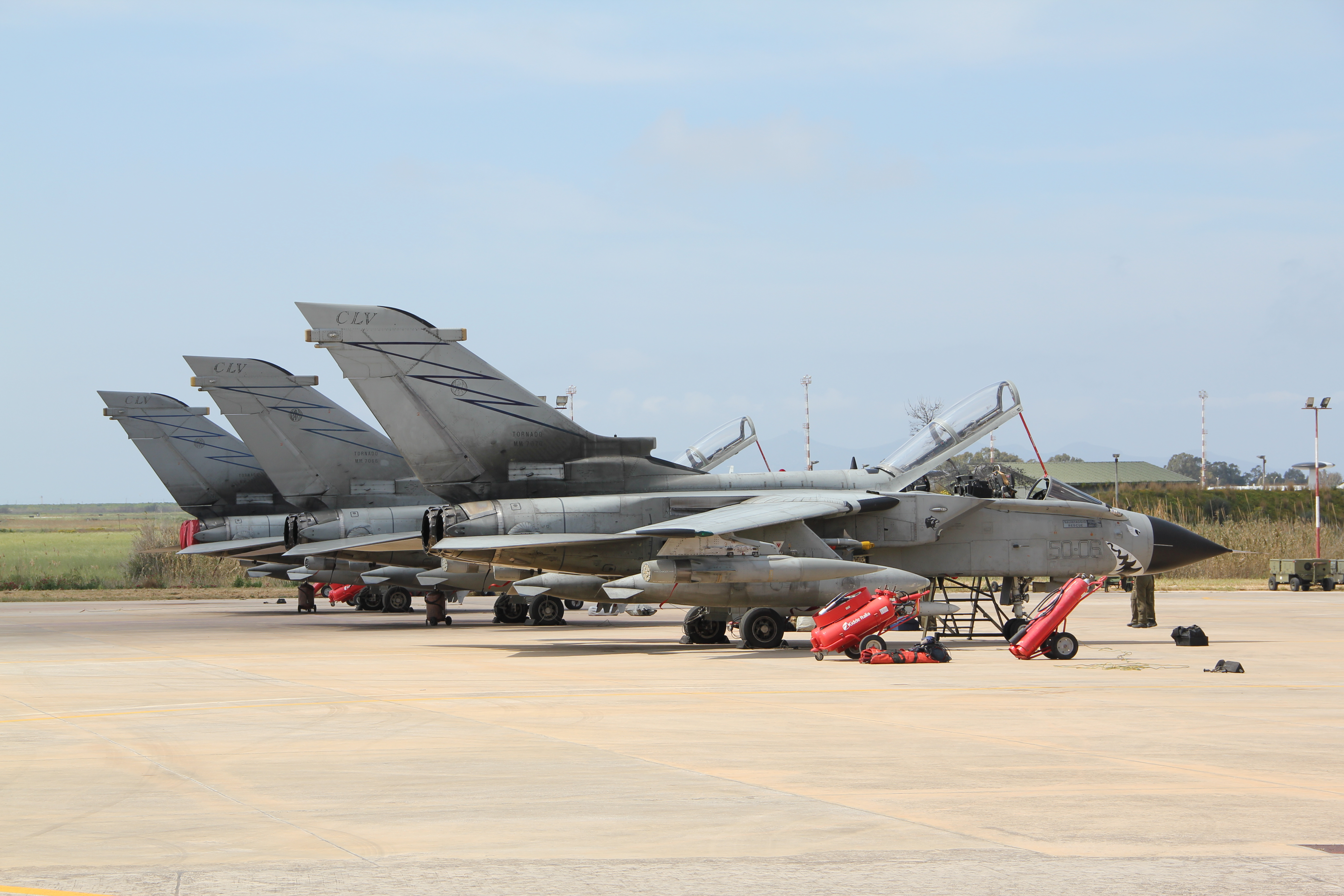
A-200 Tornados of 50° Stormo during Operation Unified Protector, 2011

In response to anticipated violence during the 2010 Afghanistan elections, Italy, along with several other nations, increased its military commitment in Afghanistan, dispatching four A-200 Tornados to the region. Italy has opted to extend the Tornado's service life at the expense of alternative ground-attack aircraft such as the AMX International AMX; in 2010 a major upgrade and life extension programme was initiated, to provide new digital displays, Link 16 communications capability, night-vision goggles compatibility, and several other upgrades. In the long term, it is planned to replace the Tornado IDS/ECR fleet in Italian service with the F-35 Lightning II, with the final Italian Tornado scheduled to be phased out in 2025. The Aeronautica Militare received its first of an eventual 15 upgraded Tornado EA-200s on 15 June 2013.

Italian Tornado A-200 and EA-200 aircraft participated in the enforcement of a UN no-fly zone during the 2011 military intervention in Libya. Various coalition aircraft operated from bases in Italy, including RAF Tornados. Italian military aircraft delivered a combined 710 guided bombs and missiles during the strikes against Libyan targets. Of these Aeronautica Militare Tornados and AMX fighter-bombers released 550 guided bombs and missiles, and Italian Navy AV-8Bs delivered 160 guided bombs. Italian Tornados launched 20 to 30 Storm Shadow cruise missiles with the rest consisting of Paveway and JDAM guided bombs.

On 19 August 2014, two Aeronautica Militare Tornados collided in mid-air during a training mission near Ascoli. On 14 November 2014, Italy announced it was sending four Tornado aircraft with 135 support staff to Ahmad al-Jaber Air Base and to two other bases in Kuwait in participation of coalition operations against the Islamic State. The four aircraft will be used for reconnaissance missions only.

In October 2018, it was announced that the EA-200 Tornado had successfully completed operational testing of the AGM-88E AARGM, providing capabilities of an "expanded target set, counter-shutdown capability, advanced signals processing for improved detection and locating, geographic specificity, and a weapon impact-assessment broadcast capability."

=== Royal Air Force ===
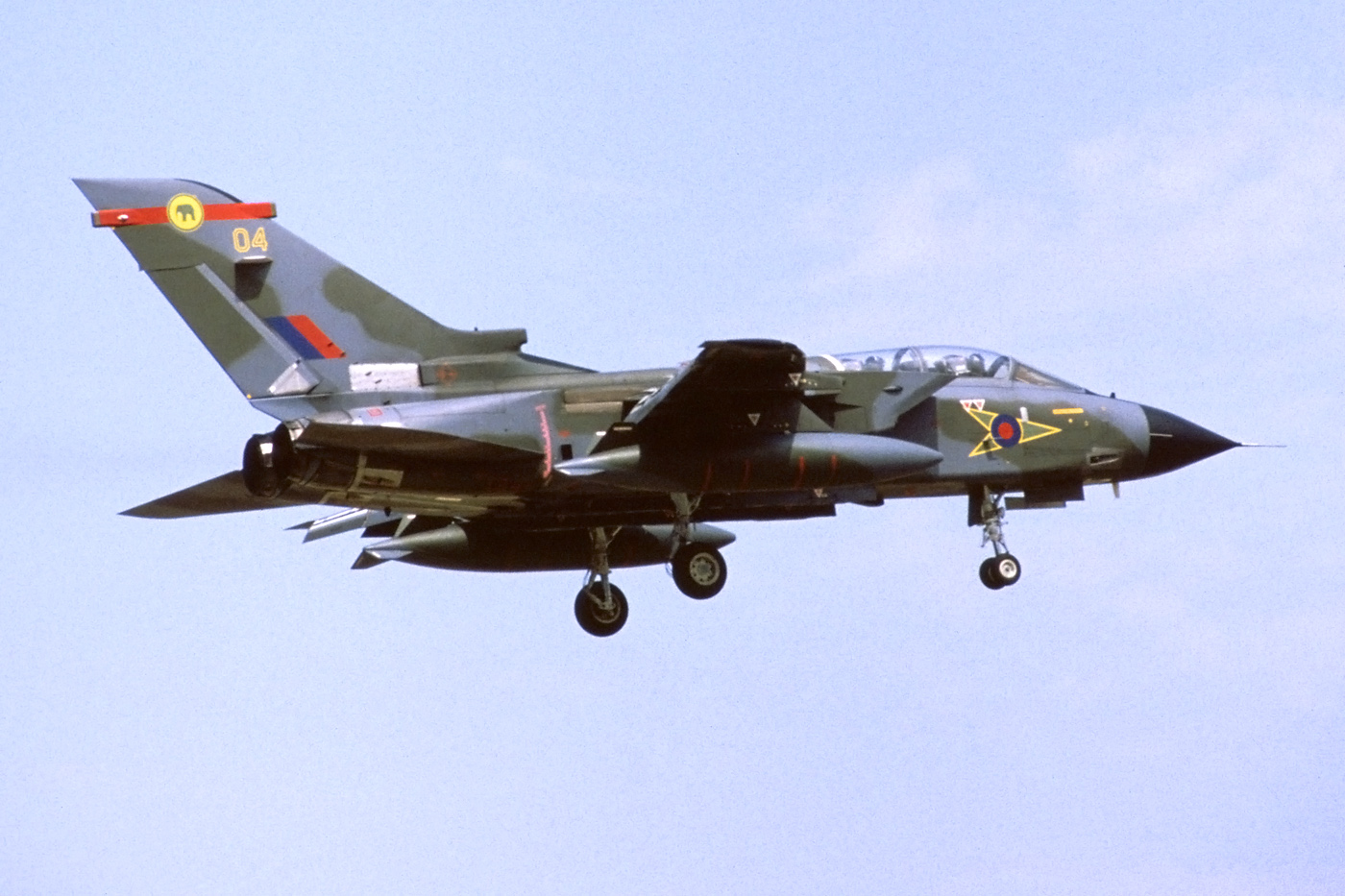
Tornado GR1 ZA613 of No. 27 Squadron arriving at RIAT, July 1983

Nicknamed the "Tonka" by the British, their first prototype (XX946) made its maiden flight on 30 October 1974 from BAC Warton. The first full production Tornado GR1 (ZA319) flew on 10 July 1979 from Warton. The first RAF Tornados (ZA320 and ZA322) were delivered to the TTTE at RAF Cottesmore on 1 July 1980. Crew that qualified from the TTTE went onto the Tornado Weapons Conversion Unit (TWCU), which formed on 1 August 1981 at RAF Honington, before being posted to a front-line squadron. No. IX (B) Squadron became the first front-line squadron in the world to operate the Tornado when it reformed on 1 June 1982, having received its first Tornado GR1 ZA586 on 6 January 1982. No. IX (B) Squadron was declared strike combat ready to the Supreme Allied Commander Europe (SACEUR) in January 1983. Two more squadrons were formed at RAF Marham in 1983 – No. 617 Squadron on 1 January and No. 27 Squadron on 12 August. The first RAF Tornado GR1 loss was on 27 September 1983 when ZA586 suffered complete electrical failure and crashed. Navigator Flt. Lt. Nigel Nickles ejected but the pilot Sqn. Ldr. Michael Stephens died in the crash after ordering ejection. In January 1984, the TWCU became No. 45 (Reserve) Squadron.

RAF Germany (RAFG) began receiving Tornados after the formation of No. XV (Designate) Squadron on 1 September 1983 at RAF Laarbruch followed by No. 16 (Designate) Squadron in January 1984 (both Buccaneer squadrons). They were then joined by No. 20 (Designate) Squadron in May 1984 (who were operating the SEPECAT Jaguar GR1 from RAF Brüggen). Unlike the Tornado squadrons based in the UK which were under control of the British military, those stationed in RAFG were under the control of SACEUR, with the aircraft on Quick Reaction Alert (Nuclear), "QRA (N)", being equipped with the WE.177 nuclear bomb. In the event of the Cold War going 'hot', the majority of RAFG Tornado squadrons were tasked with destroying Warsaw Pact airfields and surface-to-air missile (SAM) sites in East Germany. While No. 20 Squadron was given a separate responsibility of destroying bridges over the rivers Elbe and Weser to prevent Warsaw Pact forces from advancing. By early 1985, Nos. XV, 16 and 20 Squadrons at RAF Laarbruch had been declared strike combat ready to SACEUR.

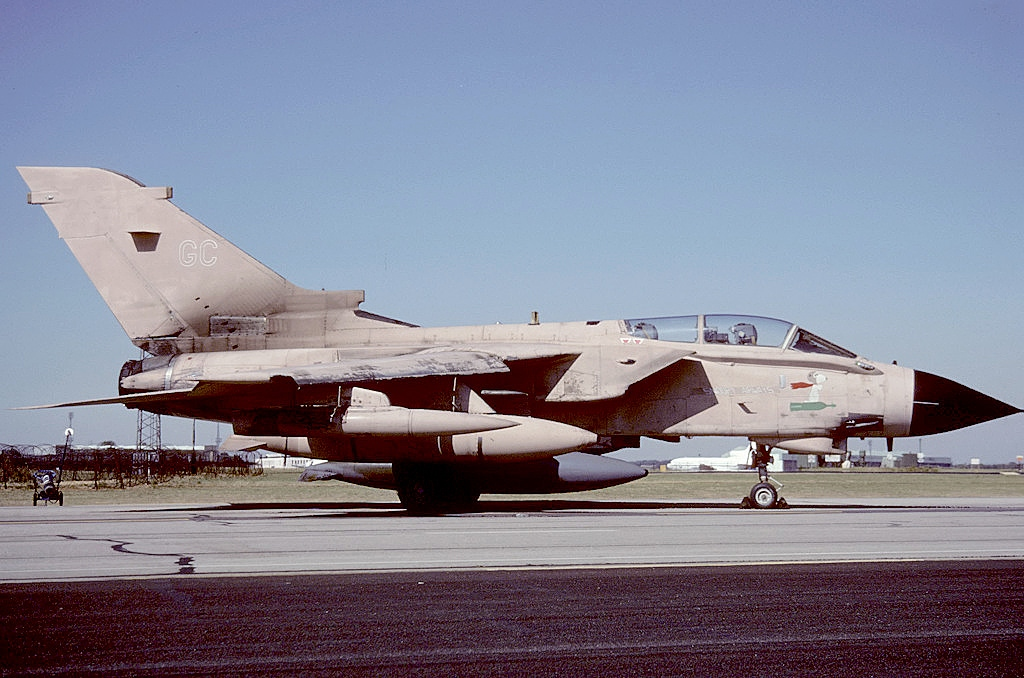
Tornado GR1 ZA491 of No. 20 Squadron at RAF Brize Norton, September 1991. This example is in the "desert pink" used for Operation Granby.

Tornados began to arrive at RAF Brüggen in September 1984 with the formation of No. 31 (Designate) Squadron. No. 17 (Designate) Squadron was formed in December 1984, and these two squadrons were joined by No. 14 (Designate) Squadron in mid-1985. No. IX (B) Squadron relocated from RAF Honington to RAF Brüggen on 1 October 1986, arriving in a diamond formation. The outcome of the Reykjavík Summit in October 1986 led to the end of QRA (Nuclear) for the Tornado force. By the end of 1986, the Tornado GR1 fleet had been equipped with a Laser Ranger and Marked Target Seeker (LRMTS) under the nose, and had begun to be equipped with the BOZ-107 chaff and flare dispenser.

The Tornado made its combat debut as part of Operation Granby, the British contribution to the Gulf War in 1991. This saw 49 RAF Tornado GR1s deploy to Muharraq Airfield in Bahrain and to Tabuk Air Base and Dhahran Airfield in Saudi Arabia. 18 Tornado F3s were deployed to provide air cover, the threat of their long range missiles being a deterrent to Iraqi pilots, who would avoid combat when approached. Early on in the conflict, the GR1s targeted military airfields across Iraq, deploying a mixture of 450 kg (1,000 lb) unguided bombs in loft-bombing attacks and specialised JP233 runway denial weapons. On 17 January 1991, the first Tornado to be lost was shot down by an Iraqi SA-16 missile following a failed low-level bombing run. On 19 January, another RAF Tornado was shot down during an intensive raid on Tallil Air Base. The impact of the Tornado strikes upon Iraqi airfields is difficult to determine. A total of six RAF Tornados were lost in the conflict, four while delivering unguided bombs, one after delivering JP233, and one trying to deliver laser-guided bombs.

The UK sent a detachment of Buccaneer aircraft equipped with Pave Spike laser designators, allowing Tornado GR1s to drop precision guided weapons guided by the Buccaneers. A planned programme to fit GR1s with the TIALD laser designation system was accelerated to give the Tornado force the ability to self-designate targets. Author Claus-Christian Szejnmann declared that the TIALD pod enabled the GR1 to "achieve probably the most accurate bombing in the RAF's history". Although laser designation proved effective in the Gulf War, only 23 TIALD pods had been purchased by 2000; shortages hindered combat operations over Kosovo.

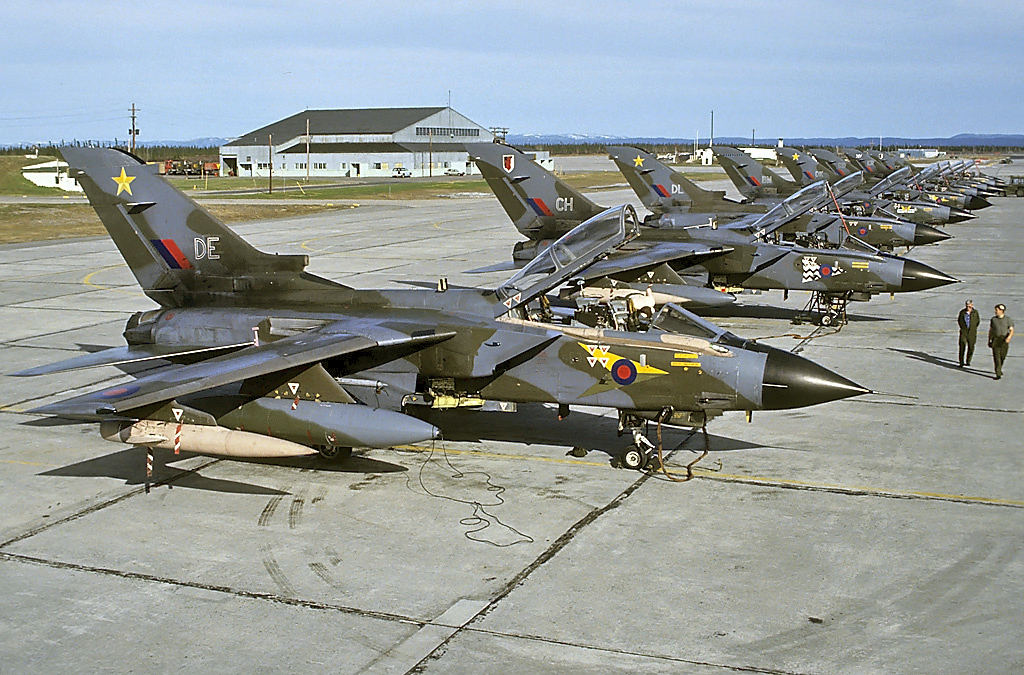
Tornado GR1s of Nos. 31, 17, 14 and XV (R) Squadrons lined up at CFB Goose Bay, June 1992

After the war's opening phase, the GR1s switched to medium-level strike missions; typical targets included munition depots and oil refineries. Only the reconnaissance Tornado GR1As continued flying the low-altitude high-speed profile, emerging unscathed despite the inherent danger in conducting pre-attack reconnaissance. After the conflict, Britain maintained a military presence in the Gulf. Around six GR1s were based at Ali Al Salem airbase in Kuwait, contributing the southern no-fly zone as part of Operation Southern Watch. Six additional GR1s participated in Operation Provide Comfort over Northern Iraq.

The upgraded Tornado GR4 made its operational debut in Operation Southern Watch; patrolling Iraq's southern airspace from bases in Kuwait. Both Tornado GR1s and GR4s based at Ali Al Salem, Kuwait, took part in coalition strikes at Iraq's military infrastructure during Operation Desert Fox in 1998. In December 1998, an Iraqi anti-aircraft battery fired six to eight missiles at a patrolling Tornado. The battery was later attacked in retaliation, and no aircraft were lost during the incident. It was reported that during Desert Fox RAF Tornados had successfully destroyed 75% of their targets, and out of the 36 missions planned, 28 had been successfully completed.

The GR1 participated in the Kosovo War in 1999. Tornados initially operated from RAF Brüggen, Germany and later from Solenzara Air Base, Corsica. Experiences from Kosovo led to the RAF procuring AGM-65 Maverick missiles and Enhanced Paveway smart bombs for the Tornado. Following the Kosovo War, the GR1 was phased out as aircraft were upgraded to GR4 standard; the final upgrade was returned to the RAF on 10 June 2003.

The GR4 was used in Operation Telic, Britain's contribution to the 2003 invasion of Iraq. RAF Tornados flew alongside American aircraft in the opening phase of the war, striking Iraqi targets. Aiming to minimise civilian casualties, Tornados deployed the Storm Shadow cruise missile for the first time. Whilst 25% of the UK's air-launched weapons in Kosovo were precision-guided, four years later in Iraq this ratio increased to 85%.

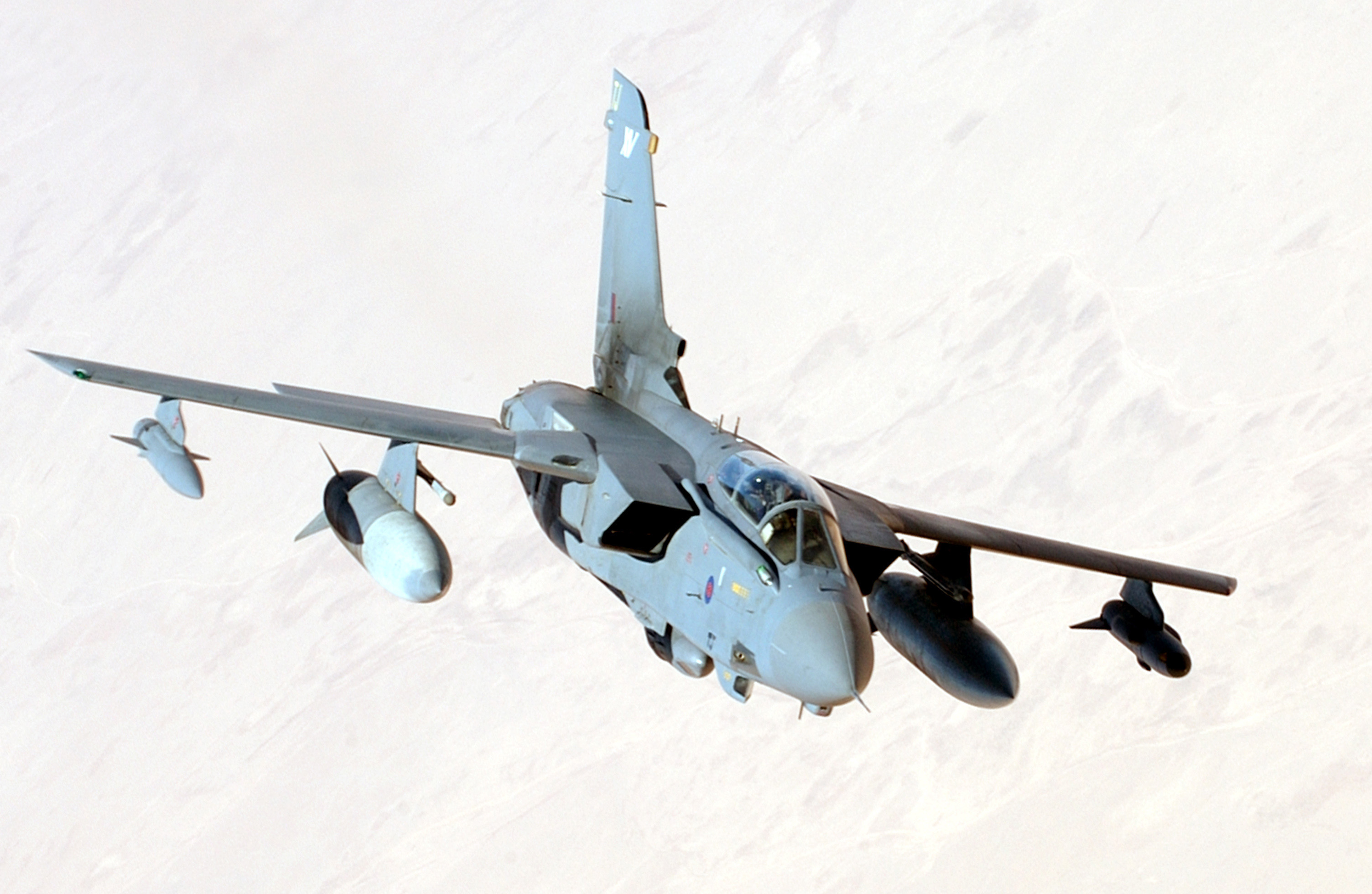
Tornado GR4 ZA557 of No. XV (Reserve) Squadron in flight over Iraq during Operation Telic, August 2004

On 23 March 2003, a Tornado GR4 was shot down over Iraq by friendly fire from a US Patriot missile battery, killing both crew members. In July 2003, a US board of inquiry exonerated the battery's operators, observing the Tornado's "lack of functioning IFF (Identification Friend or Foe)" as a factor in the incident. Problems with Patriot were also suggested as a factor, multiple incidents of mis-identification of friendly aircraft have occurred, including the fatal shootdown of a US Navy F/A-18 a few weeks after the Tornado's loss. Britain withdrew the last of its Tornados from Iraq in June 2009.

In early 2009, several GR4s arrived at Kandahar Airfield, Afghanistan to replace the Harrier GR7/9 aircraft which had been deployed there since November 2004. In 2009, Paveway IV guided bombs were brought into service on the RAF's Tornados, having been previously used in Afghanistan by the Harrier fleet. In Summer 2010, extra Tornados were dispatched to Kandahar for the duration of the 2010 Afghan election. British Tornados ended operations in Afghanistan in November 2014, having flown over 5,000 pairs sorties over 33,500 hours, including 600 "shows of force" to deter Taliban attacks. During more than 70 engagements, 140 Brimstone missiles and Paveway IV bombs were deployed, and over 3,000 27 mm cannon shells fired.

Prior to the 2010 Strategic Defence and Security Review (SDSR)'s publication, the Tornado's retirement was under consideration with savings of £7.5 billion anticipated. The SDSR announced the Tornado would be retained at the expense of the Harrier GR7/9, although numbers would decline in the transition to the Eurofighter Typhoon and the F-35 Lightning II. By July 2013, 59 RAF GR4s were receiving the CUSP avionics upgrade, which achieved Initial Service Date (ISD) in March 2013.

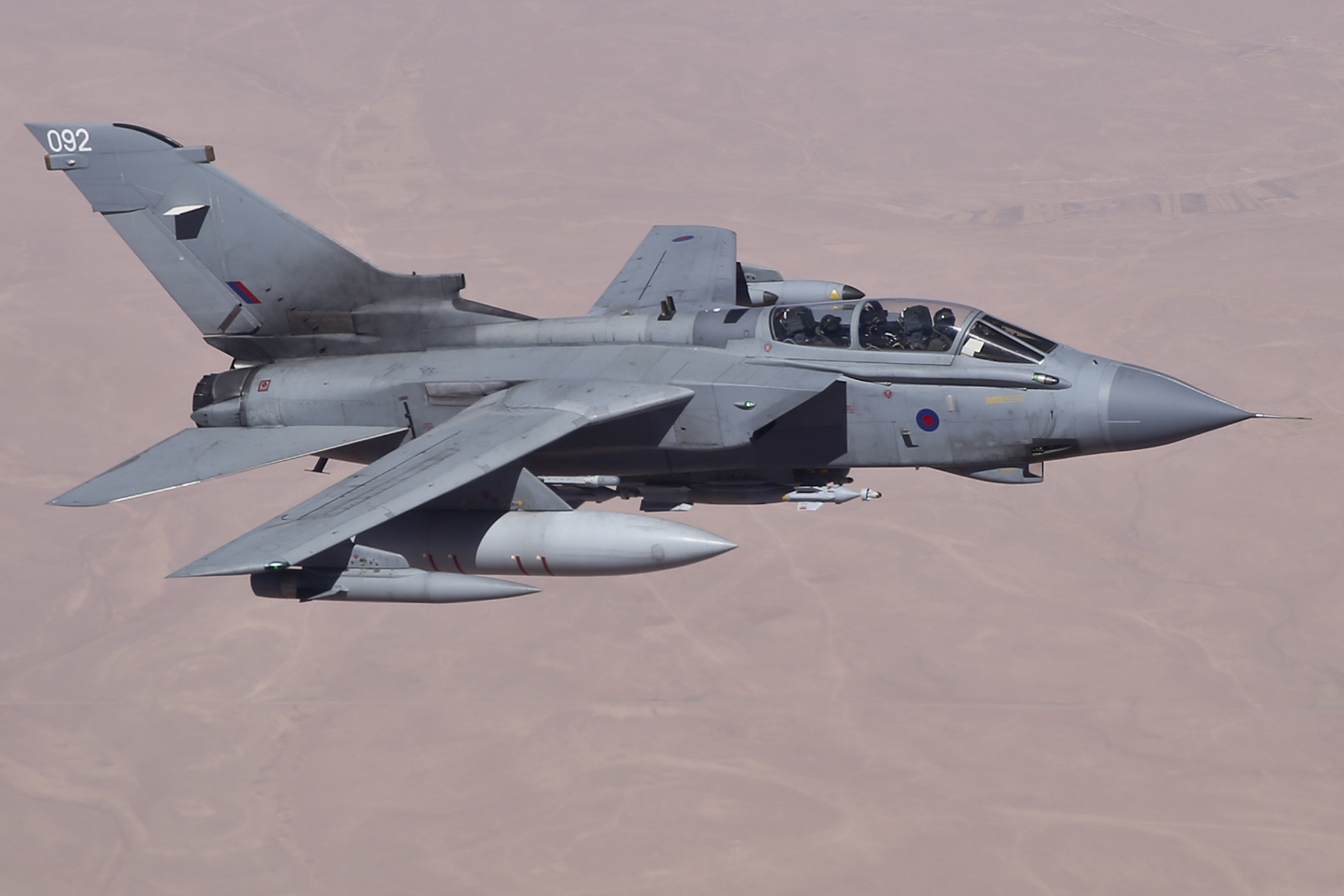
Tornado GR4 ZD744 over Iraq during Operation Shader, September 2014

On 18 March 2011, British Prime Minister David Cameron announced that Tornados and Typhoons would enforce a no-fly zone in Libya. In March 2011, several Tornados flew 3,000-mile (4,800 km) strike missions against targets inside Libya in what were "the longest range bombing mission conducted by the RAF since the Falklands conflict". A variety of munitions were used during Tornado operations over Libya, including laser-guided bombs and Brimstone missiles.

In August 2014, Tornado GR4s were deployed to RAF Akrotiri, Cyprus to support refugees sheltering from Islamic State militants in northern Iraq. The decision came three days after the United States began conducting air attacks against the Islamic State. Tornados were pre-positioned to gather situational awareness in the region. On 27 September 2014, after Parliament approved airstrikes against Islamic State forces inside Iraq, two Tornados conducted their first armed reconnaissance mission in conjunction with coalition aircraft. The next day, two Tornados made the first airstrike on a heavy weapons post and an armoured vehicle, supporting Kurdish forces in northwest Iraq.

By 1 March 2015, eight RAF Tornados had been deployed to Akrotiri and conducted 159 airstrikes against IS targets in Iraq. On 2 December 2015, Parliament approved air strikes in Syria as well as Iraq to combat the growing threat of ISIL; Tornados began bombing that evening. On 14 April 2018, four Tornado GR4s from RAF Akrotiri struck a Syrian military facility with Storm Shadow cruise missiles in response to a suspected chemical attack on Douma by the Syrian regime the previous week.

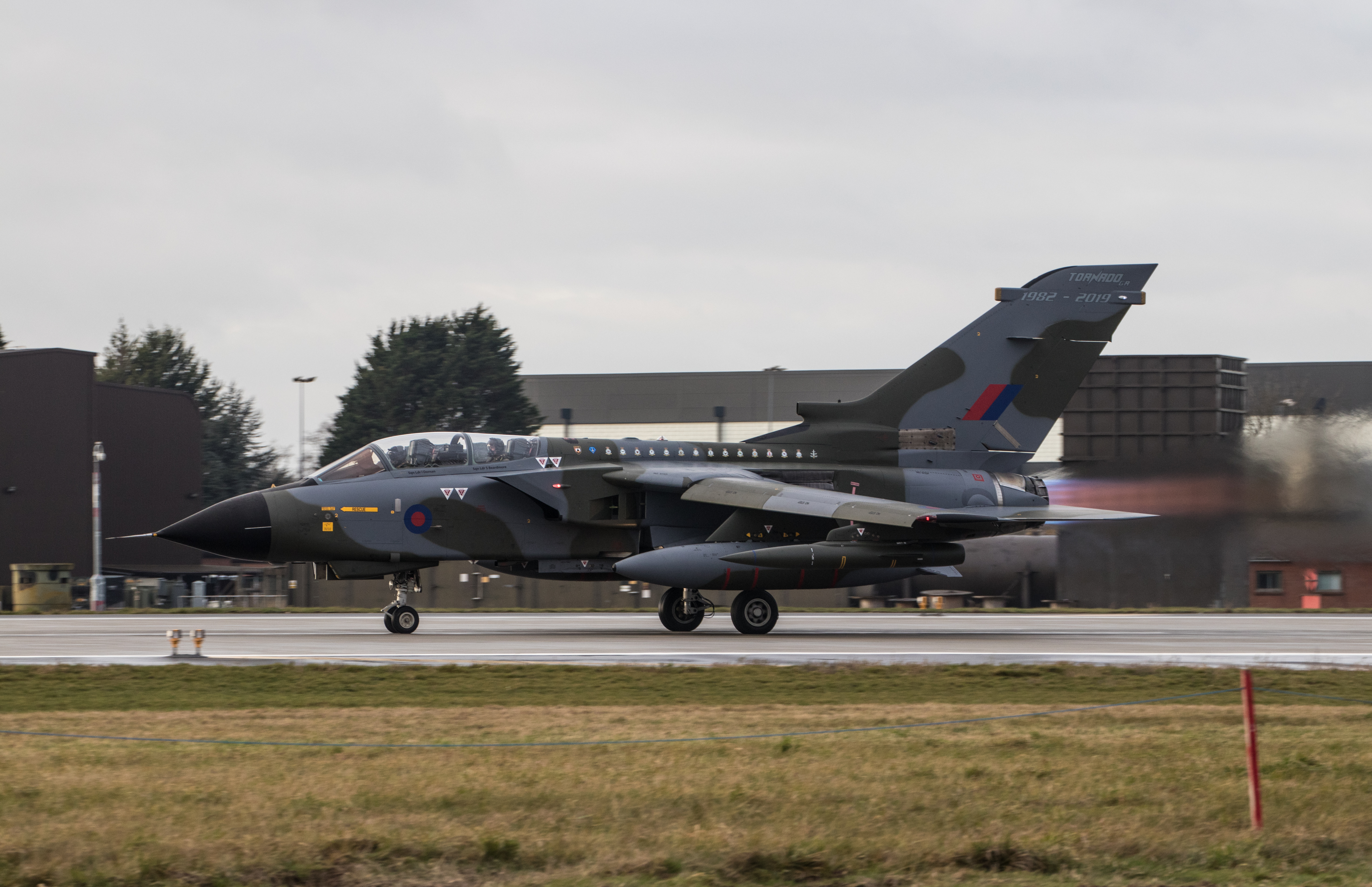
Tornado GR4 in a retro scheme to mark the Tornado GR4's retirement departing RAF Marham, January 2019

On 10 July 2018, nine Tornado GR4s from RAF Marham flew over London to celebrate 100 years of the RAF. During late 2018, the RAF commemorated the Tornado's service with three special schemes: ZG752 paid homage to its early years with a green/grey wraparound camouflage; ZG775 and ZD716 both wore schemes commemorating the final units to operate the type – No. IX (B) Squadron and No. 31 Squadron respectively. On 31 January 2019, the Tornado GR4 flew its last operational sorties in Operation Shader. The eight Tornados formerly stationed at RAF Akrotiri returned to RAF Marham in early February 2019, their duties assumed by six Typhoons. Between September 2014 and January 2019, RAF Tornados accounted for 31% of the estimated 4,315 casualties inflicted upon ISIL by the RAF during the operation.

To celebrate 40 years of service and to mark the type's retirement, several flypasts were carried out on 19, 20 and 21 February 2019 over locations such as BAE Warton, RAF Honington and RAF Lossiemouth. On 28 February, nine Tornados flew out of RAF Marham for a diamond nine formation flypast over a graduation parade at RAF Cranwell before returning and carrying out a series of passes over RAF Marham. On 14 March 2019 the final flight of an RAF Tornado was carried out by Tornado GR4 ZA463, the oldest remaining Tornado, over RAF Marham during the disbandment parade of No. IX (B) Squadron and No. 31 Squadron. The Tornado GR4 was officially retired from RAF service on 1 April 2019, the 101st anniversary of the force. Post-retirement, five Tornados returned to RAF Honington via road for the Complex Air Ground Environment (CAGE), which simulates a Tornado flight line for training purposes.

On 2 July 2023, it was reported that pylons from decommissioned RAF Panavia Tornado GR4s had been fitted to Ukrainian Su-24s, so that they could launch the Storm Shadow missile. These Su-24s can carry at least two Storm Shadows. Unlike missiles carried by the Tornado, it was reported that missiles carried by the Su-24 required the coordinates of targets to be entered before takeoff.

=== Royal Saudi Air Force ===
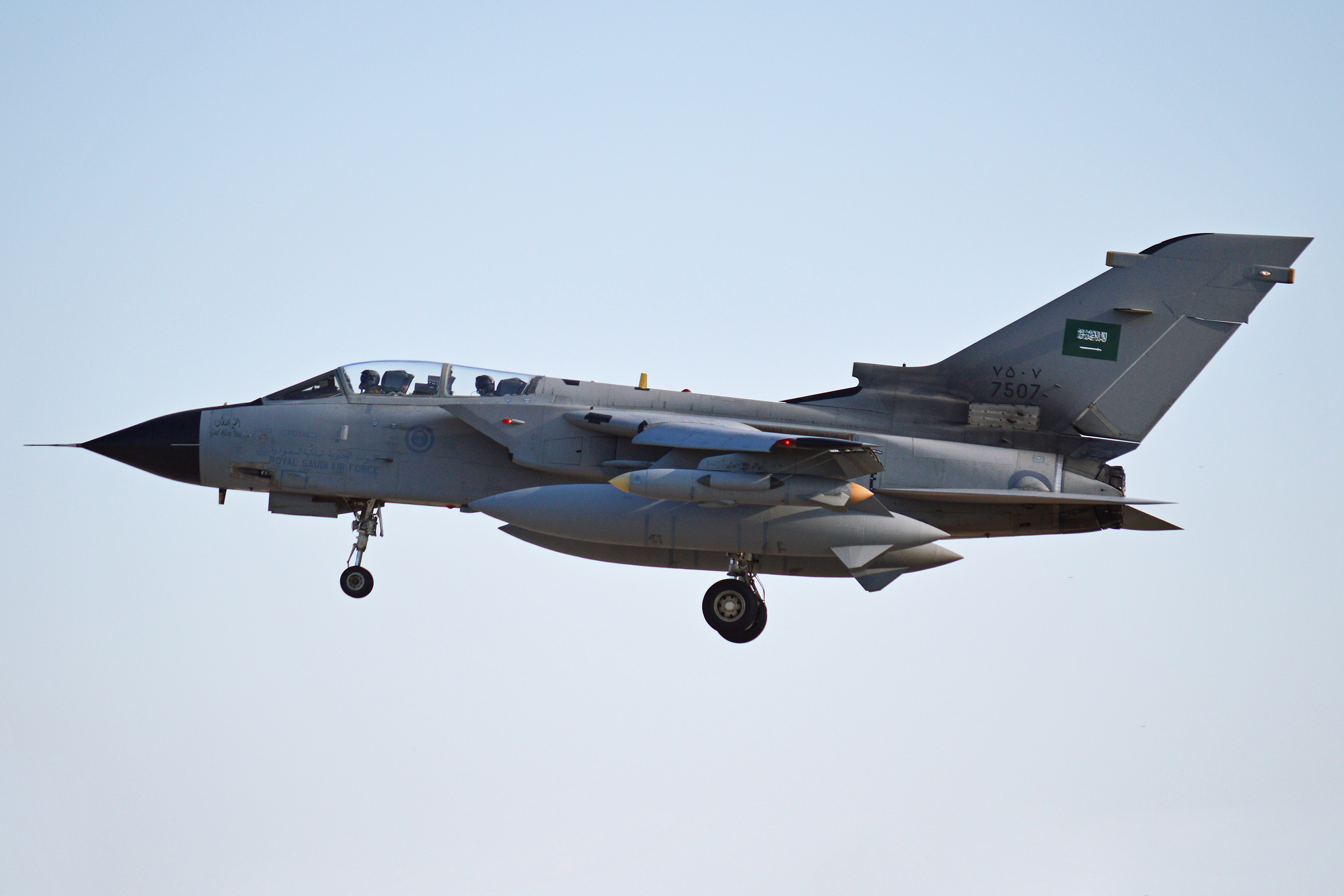
RSAF Tornado IDS 7507 of 75 Squadron arriving at RAF Coningsby, August 2013

In 1984, Royal Saudi Air Force pilots visited RAF Honington to fly and evaluate the Tornado GR1. On 25 September 1985, the UK and Saudi Arabia signed the Al Yamamah I contract which included the sale of 48 IDS and 24 ADV Tornadoes. In October 1985, four RSAF crews joined the Tri-National Tornado Training Establishment at RAF Cottesmore. The first flight of a Saudi Tornado IDS (701) was on 17 February 1986, and the first four IDS were delivered to King Abdul Aziz Air Base, Dharan in 26 March 1986. The first Saudi Tornado squadron formed was No. 7 Squadron, which had received 20 aircraft by 8 October 1987. The first Saudi ADV (2905) flew on 1 December 1988, and the first deliveries arrived in Saudi Arabia on 20 March 1989. The first two RSAF ADV squadrons, Nos. 29 and 34 Squadrons, were formed and reached their full strength of 12 aircraft each by 1990.

In the run-up to the Gulf War, the RSAF began to pool its Tornado squadrons together, with the joint 24 aircraft strong ADV unit flying missions as part of Operation Desert Shield. Saudi Tornados took part in the Gulf War, with No. 7 Squadron carrying out their first mission on the night of 17 January 1991. In total, the RSAF flew 665 Tornado IDS sorties and 451 ADV sorties, seeing the loss of one IDS (765) on the night of 19/20 January. In June 1993, the Al Yamamah II contract was signed, the main element of which was 48 additional IDSs.

Following experience with both the Tornado and the McDonnell Douglas F-15E Strike Eagle, the RSAF discontinued low-level mission training in the F-15E in light of the Tornado's superior low-altitude flight performance. Ten of the Saudi Tornados were fitted with equipment for performing reconnaissance missions. The 22 Tornado ADVs were replaced by the Eurofighter Typhoon; the retired aircraft were purchased back by the UK.

By 2007, both the Sea Eagle anti-ship missile and the ALARM anti-radiation missile that previously equipped the RSAF's Tornados had been withdrawn from service. As of 2010, Saudi Arabia has signed several contracts for new weapon systems to be fitted to their Tornado and Typhoon fleets, such as the short range air-to-air IRIS-T missile, and the Brimstone and Storm Shadow missiles.

In September 2006, the Saudi government signed a contract worth £2.5 billion (US$4.7 billion) with BAE Systems to upgrade up to 80 RSAF Tornado IDS aircraft to keep them in service until 2020. The first RSAF Tornado was returned to BAE Systems Warton in December 2006 for upgrade under the "Tornado Sustainment Programme" (TSP) to "equip the IDS fleet with a range of new precision-guided weapons and enhanced targeting equipment, in many cases common with those systems already fielded by the UK's Tornado GR4s." In December 2007, the first RSAF aircraft to complete modernisation was returned to Saudi Arabia.

Starting from the first week of November 2009, RSAF Tornados, along with Saudi F-15s performed air raids during the Shia insurgency in north Yemen. It was the first time since Operation Desert Storm in 1991 that the RSAF had participated in a military operation over hostile territory. RSAF Tornados are playing a central role in Saudi-led bombing campaign in Yemen.

On 7 January 2018, Houthi fighters claimed to have shot down a Saudi warplane which was conducting air-raids over northern Yemen. According to Saudi reports, the downed aircraft was an RSAF Tornado which was on a combat mission over Saada province in northern Yemen, it was lost for 'technical reasons' and both crew were rescued.

On 12 July 2018, another RSAF Tornado crashed in Asir region after returning from Saada, Yemen due to a technical malfunction. On 14 February 2020, a Saudi Tornado was shot down during close air support mission in support of Saudi allied Yemeni forces in the Yemeni Al Jouf governorate by Houthis. On the day after, the Saudi command confirmed the loss of a Tornado, while a video was released showing the downing using a two-stage surface to air missile. Both pilots ejected and were captured by Houthis.

== Variants ==
=== Tornado IDS ===
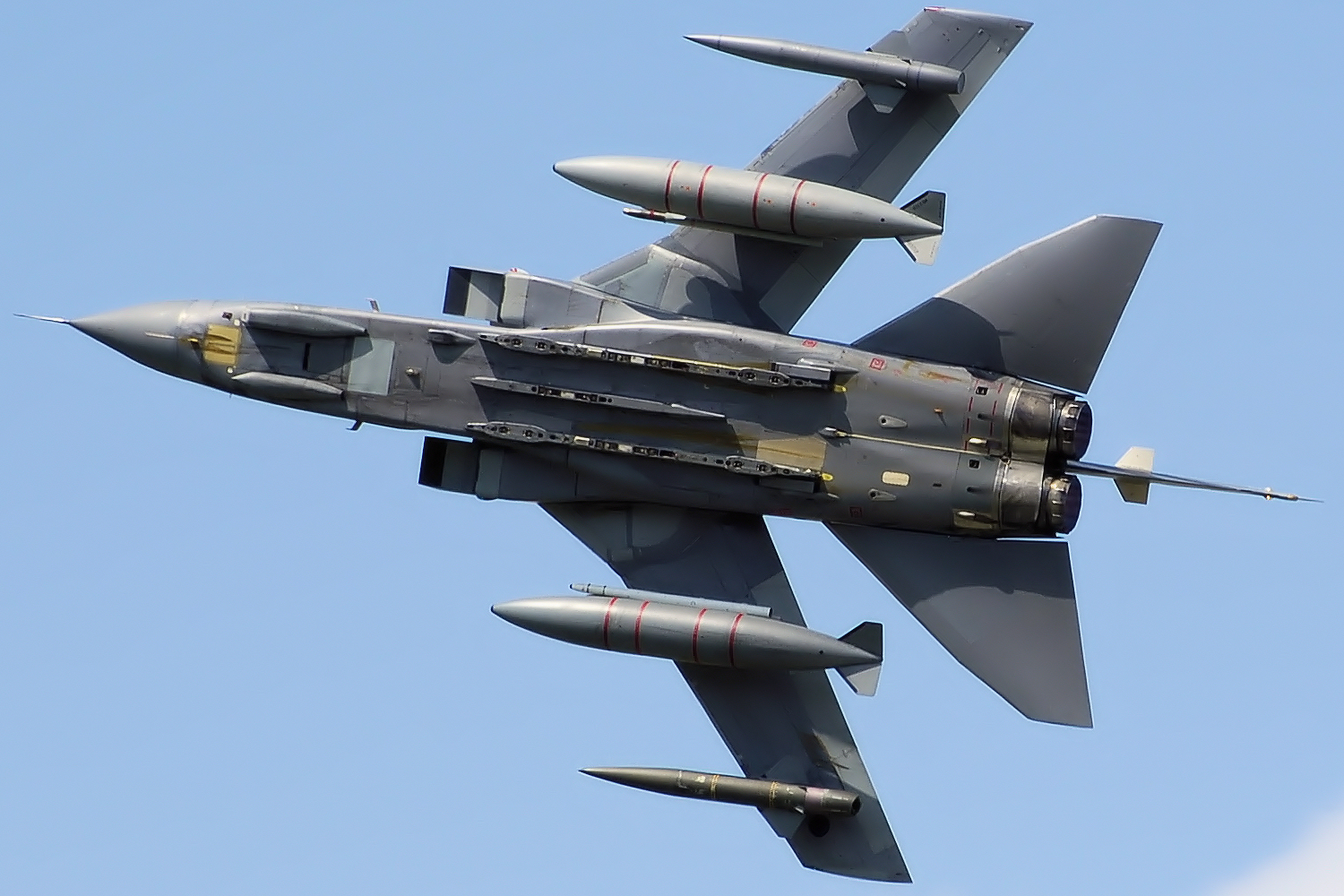
RAF Tornado GR4 ZA597 displaying at Kemble Air Show in 2008, the wings are partially swept

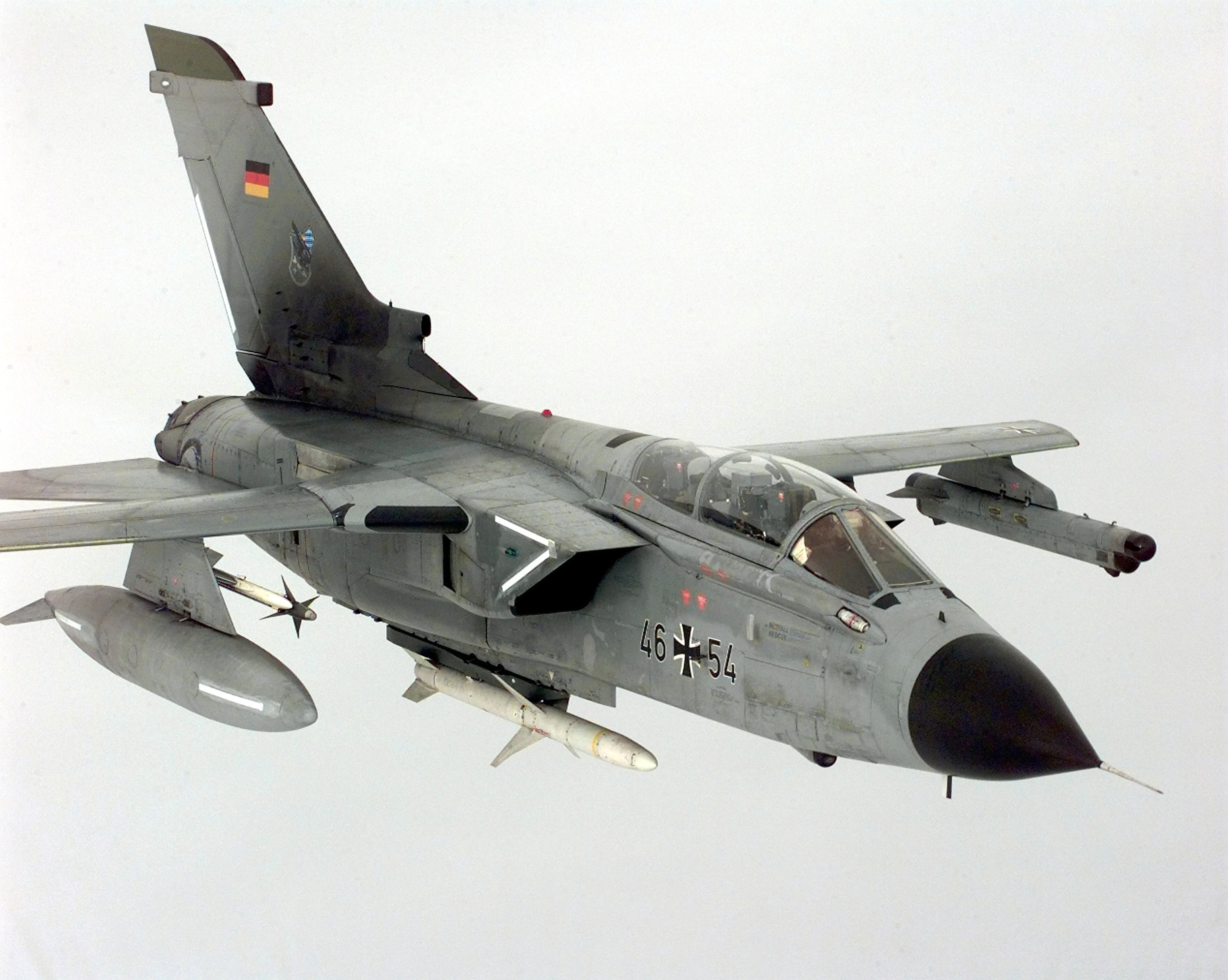
Luftwaffe Tornado ECR 46+54 participating in Operation Allied Force in April 1999

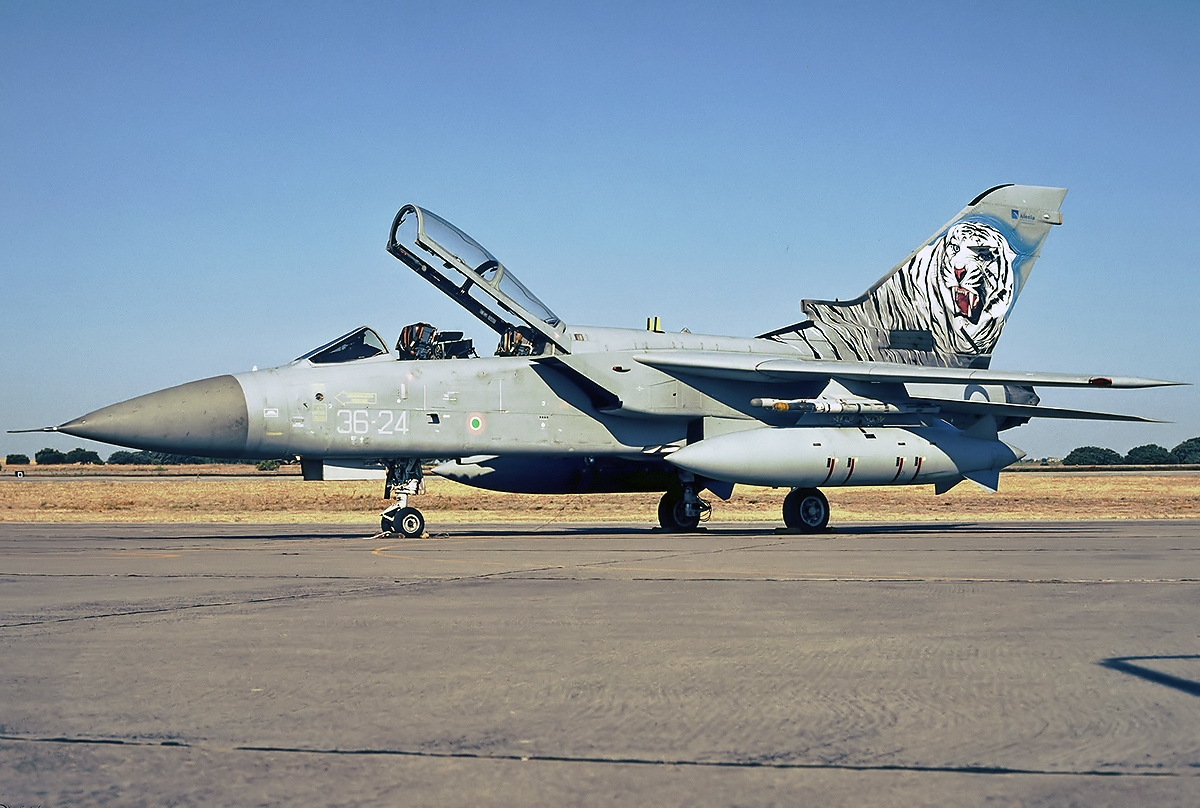
Aeronautica Militare Tornado F3 MM7234 of 36º Stormo at Gioia del Colle Air Base, 2002

Tornado GR1

RAF IDS (interdictor/strike) variants were initially designated the Tornado GR1 with later modified aircraft designated Tornado GR1A, Tornado GR1B, Tornado GR4 and Tornado GR4A. The first of 228 GR1s was delivered on 5 June 1979, and the type entered service in the early 1980s.

Tornado GR1B

The Tornado GR1B was a specialised anti-shipping variant of the GR1, replacing the Buccaneer. 26 aircraft were converted and were based at RAF Lossiemouth, Scotland. Each aircraft was equipped to carry up to four Sea Eagle anti-ship missiles. At first the GR1B lacked the radar capability to track shipping, instead relying on the missile's seeker for target acquisition; later updates allowed target data to be passed from aircraft to missile.

Tornado GR1P

A single Tornado GR1 (ZA326, the eighth production aircraft) was re-designated GR1P after being partially rebuilt using parts from different production batches following a fire during engine testing. This aircraft served with the Royal Aircraft Establishment and the Empire Test Pilot's School until 2005, when it was retired, being the last GR1 in service anywhere in the world.

Tornado GR4

The UK Ministry of Defence began studies for a GR1 Mid-Life Update (MLU) in 1984. The update to GR4 standard, approved in 1994, would improve capability in the medium-altitude role based on lessons learned from the GR1's performance in the 1991 Gulf War. British Aerospace (later BAE Systems) upgraded 142 Tornado GR1s to GR4 standard, beginning in 1996 and finished in 2003. 59 RAF aircraft later received the CUSP avionics package which integrated the Paveway IV bomb and installed a new secure communications module from Cassidian in Phase A, followed by the Tactical Information Exchange (TIE) datalink from General Dynamics in Phase B.

Tornado GR1A/GR4A

The GR1A is the reconnaissance variant operated by the RAF and RSAF, fitted with the TIRRS (Tornado Infra-Red Reconnaissance System), replacing the cannon. The RAF ordered 30 GR1As, 14 as GR1 rebuilds and 16 new aircraft. When the Tornado GR1s were upgraded to become GR4s, GR1A aircraft were upgraded to GR4A standard. The switch from low-level operations to medium/high-level operations means that the internal TIRRS was no longer used. As the GR4A's internal sensors are no longer essential, the RAF's Tactical Reconnaissance Wing operated both GR4A and GR4 aircraft.

=== Tornado ECR ===
Operated by Germany and Italy, the ECR (Electronic Combat / Reconnaissance) is a Tornado variant devoted to Suppression of Enemy Air Defences missions. It was first delivered on 21 May 1990. The ECR has sensors to detect radar usage and is equipped with anti-radiation AGM-88 HARM missiles. The Luftwaffe's 35 ECRs were delivered new, while Italy received 16 converted IDSs. Italian Tornado ECRs differ from the Luftwaffe aircraft as they lack built-in reconnaissance capability and use RecceLite reconnaissance pods. Only Luftwaffe ECRs are equipped with the RB199 Mk.105 engine, which has a higher thrust rating. The German ECRs do not carry a cannon. The RAF used the IDS version in the SEAD role instead of the ECR and also modified several of its Tornado F.3s to undertake the mission.

=== Tornado ADV ===
The Tornado ADV (air defence variant) was an interceptor variant of the Tornado, developed for the RAF (designated Tornado F2 or F3) and also operated by Saudi Arabia and Italy. The ADV had inferior agility to fighters like the McDonnell Douglas F-15 Eagle, but was not intended as a dogfighter, rather as a long-endurance interceptor to counter the threat from Cold War bombers. Although the ADV had 80% parts commonality with the Tornado IDS, the ADV had greater acceleration, improved RB199 Mk.104 engines, a stretched body, greater fuel capacity, the AI.24 Foxhunter radar, and software changes. It had only one cannon to accommodate a retractable inflight refuelling probe.

== Operators ==
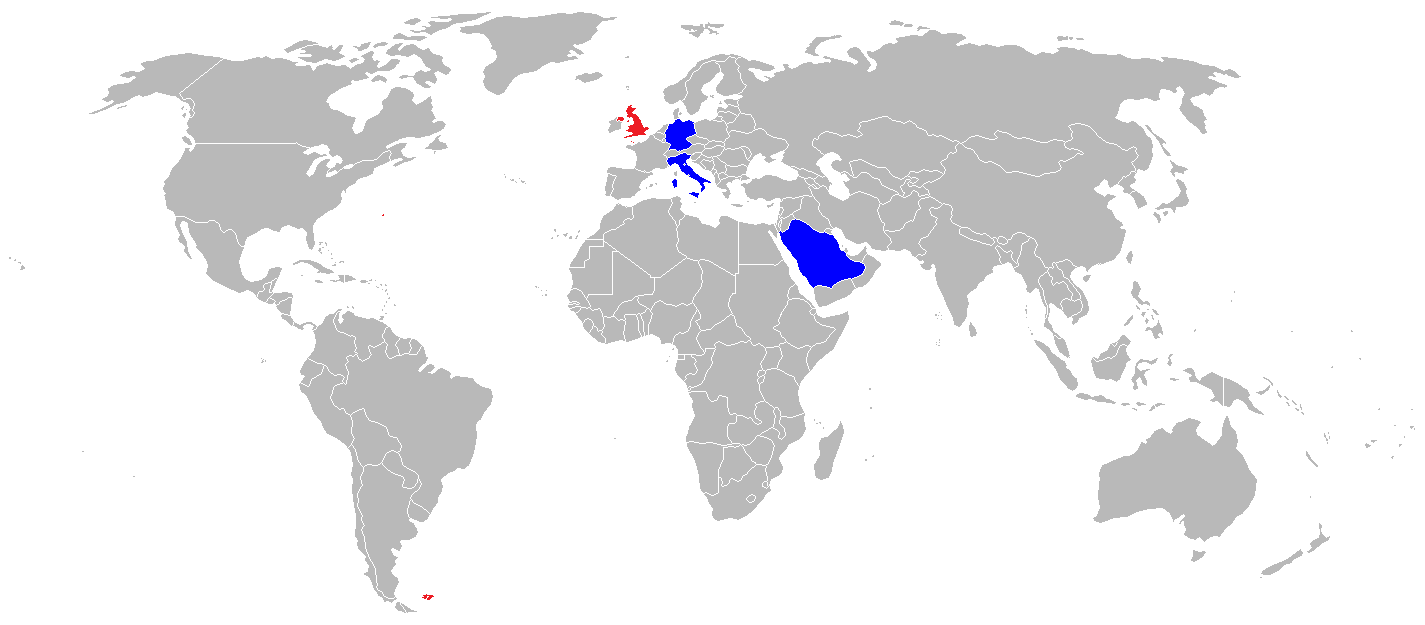
Operators Current Former

Germany

- Luftwaffe: 210 IDS and 35 ECR Tornados delivered. By December 2018, 94 IDS and 28 ECR aircraft remained in service.
- Marineflieger: 112 IDS Tornados delivered, retired in June 2005 with some aircraft being reallocated to the Luftwaffe.

Italy

- Aeronautica Militare: 100 IDS A-200 Tornados delivered (18 converted to ECR EA-200s), 24 ADV F3 aircraft later leased from the RAF between 1995 and 2004. By December 2018, 70 A-200 and 5 EA-200 aircraft remained in service.

Saudi Arabia

- Royal Saudi Air Force: 96 IDS and 24 ADV Tornados delivered, ADVs retired in 2006. By December 2018, 81 IDS aircraft remained in service.

=== Former operators ===
United Kingdom

- Royal Air Force: 385 IDS GR1 and ADV F2/F3 Tornados delivered, including 230 GR1s (142 later upgraded to GR4s), 18 F2s and 147 F3s (retired in 2011). GR4 was retired on 1 April 2019.

== Aircraft on display ==
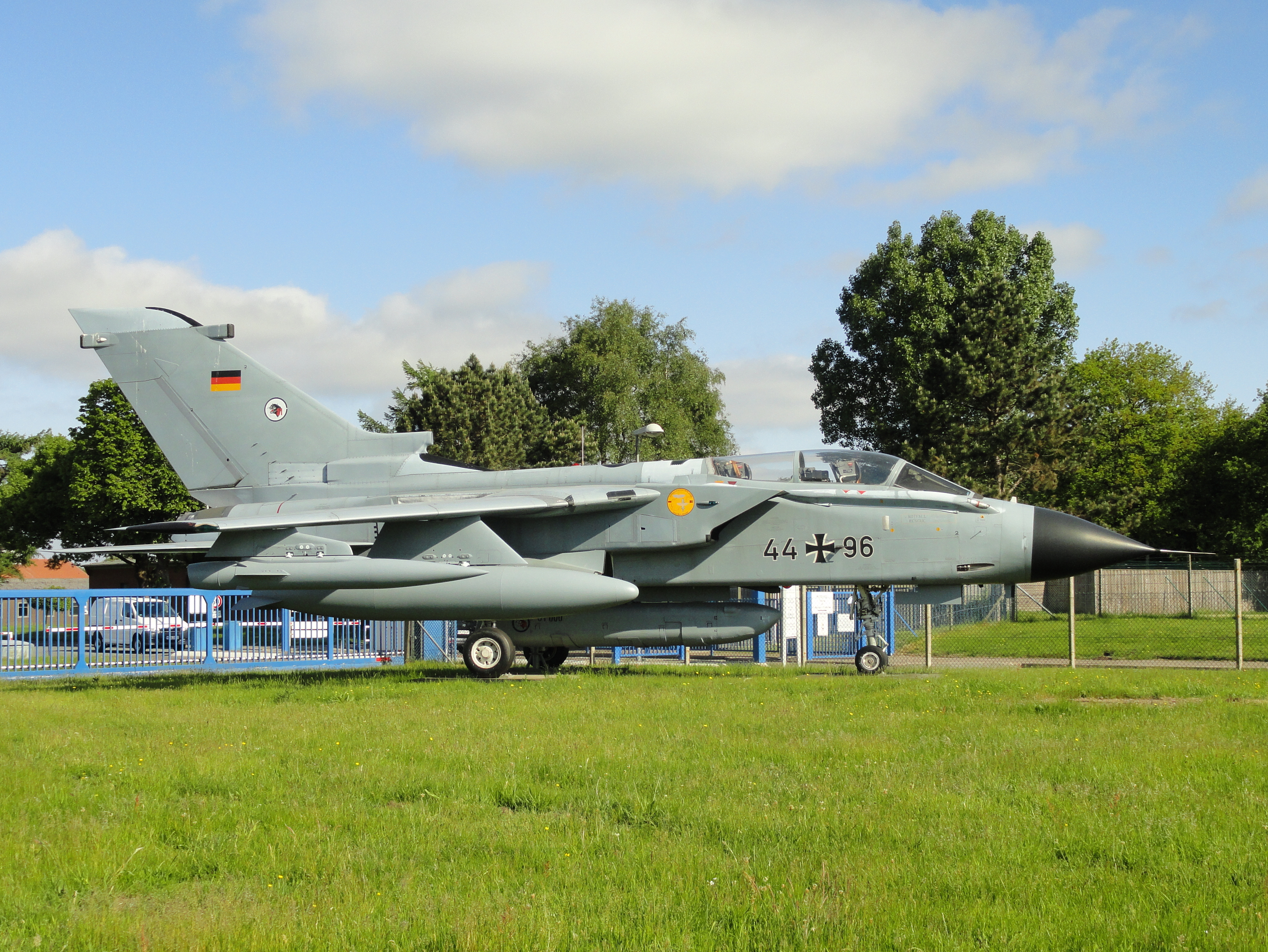
Gate guardian Tornado IDS 44+96 on display at Schleswig Air Base

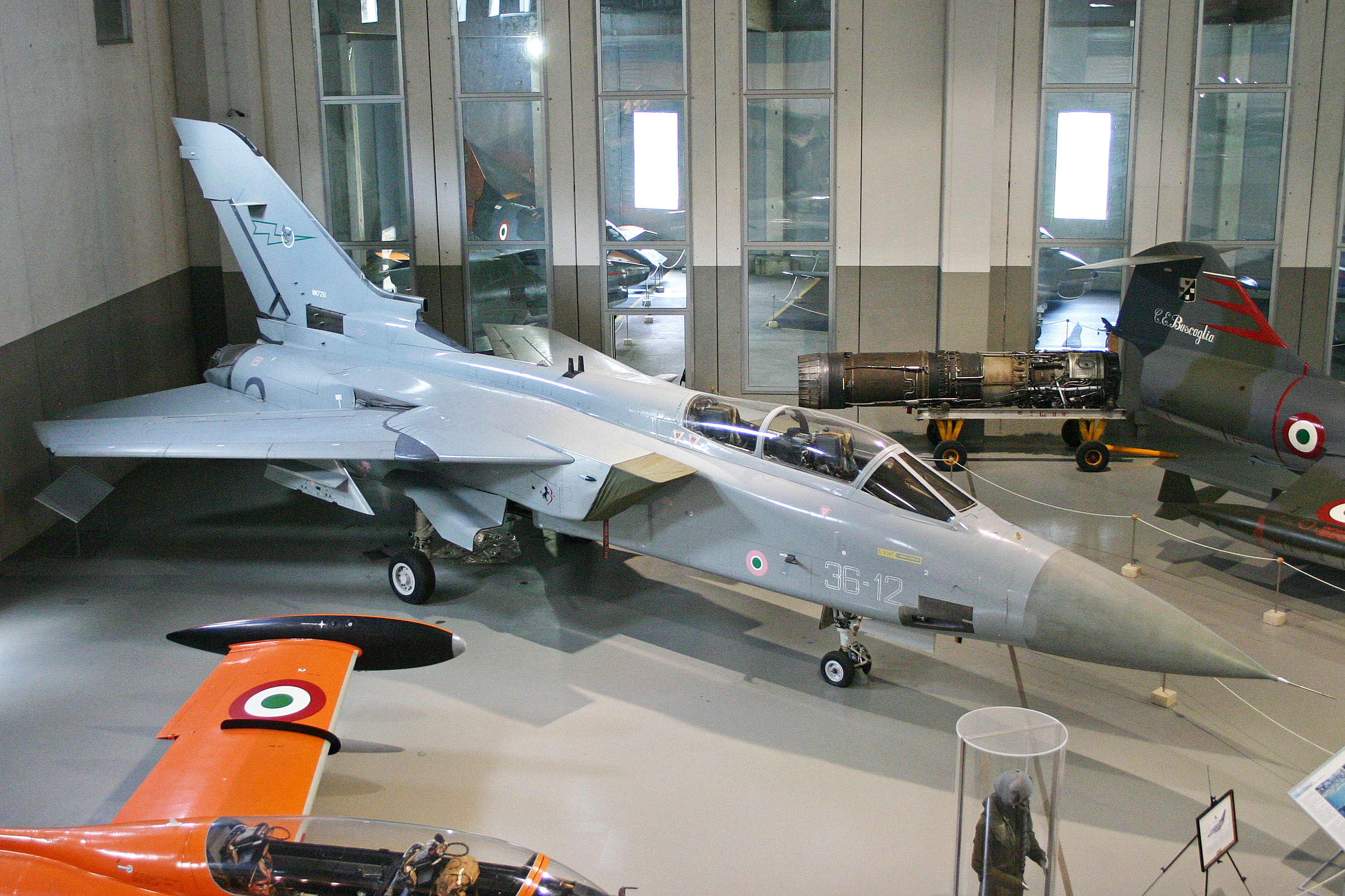
Tornado F3 MM7210 at the Italian Air Force Museum

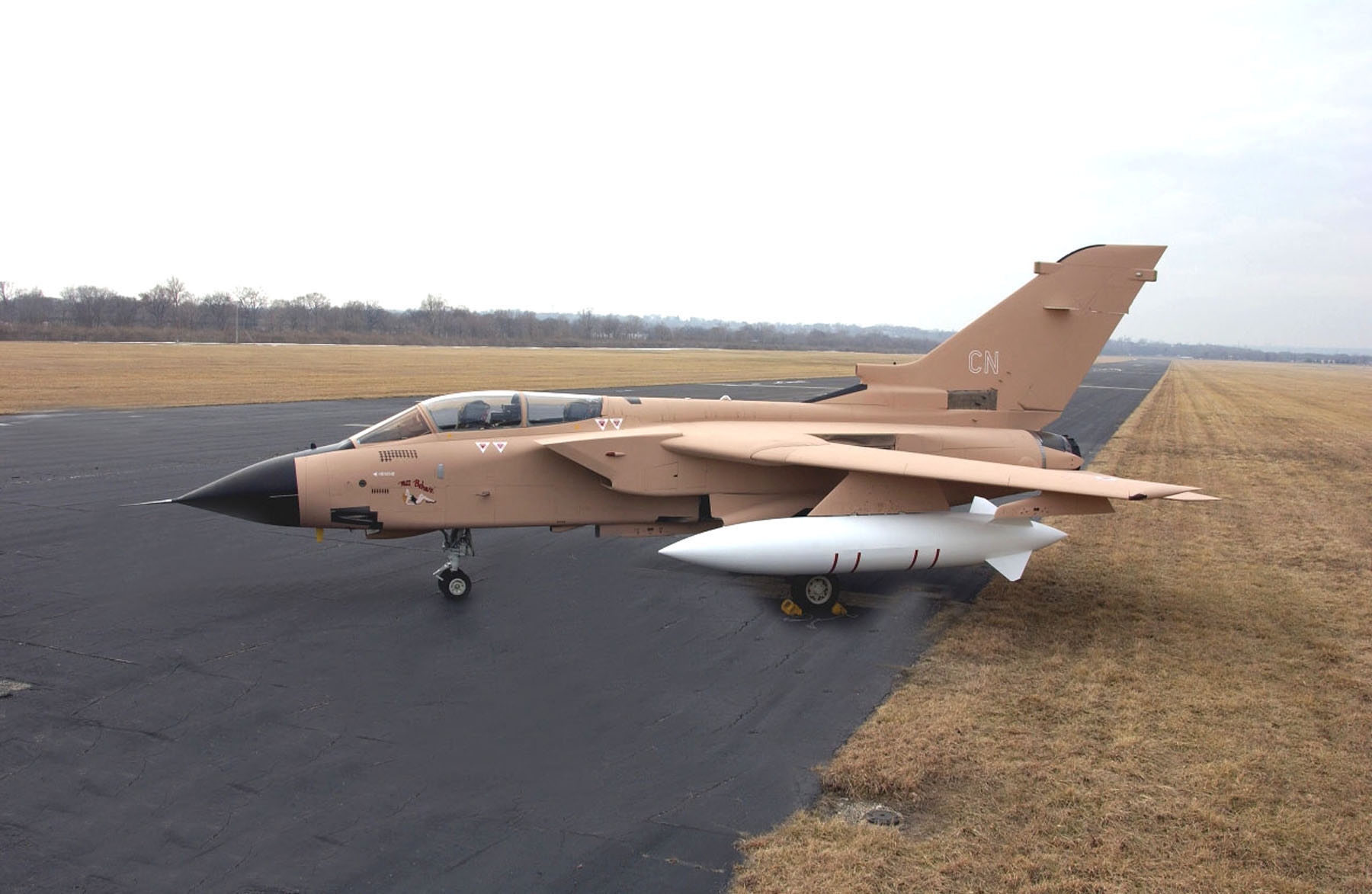
Tornado GR1 ZA374 at the National Museum of the United States Air Force

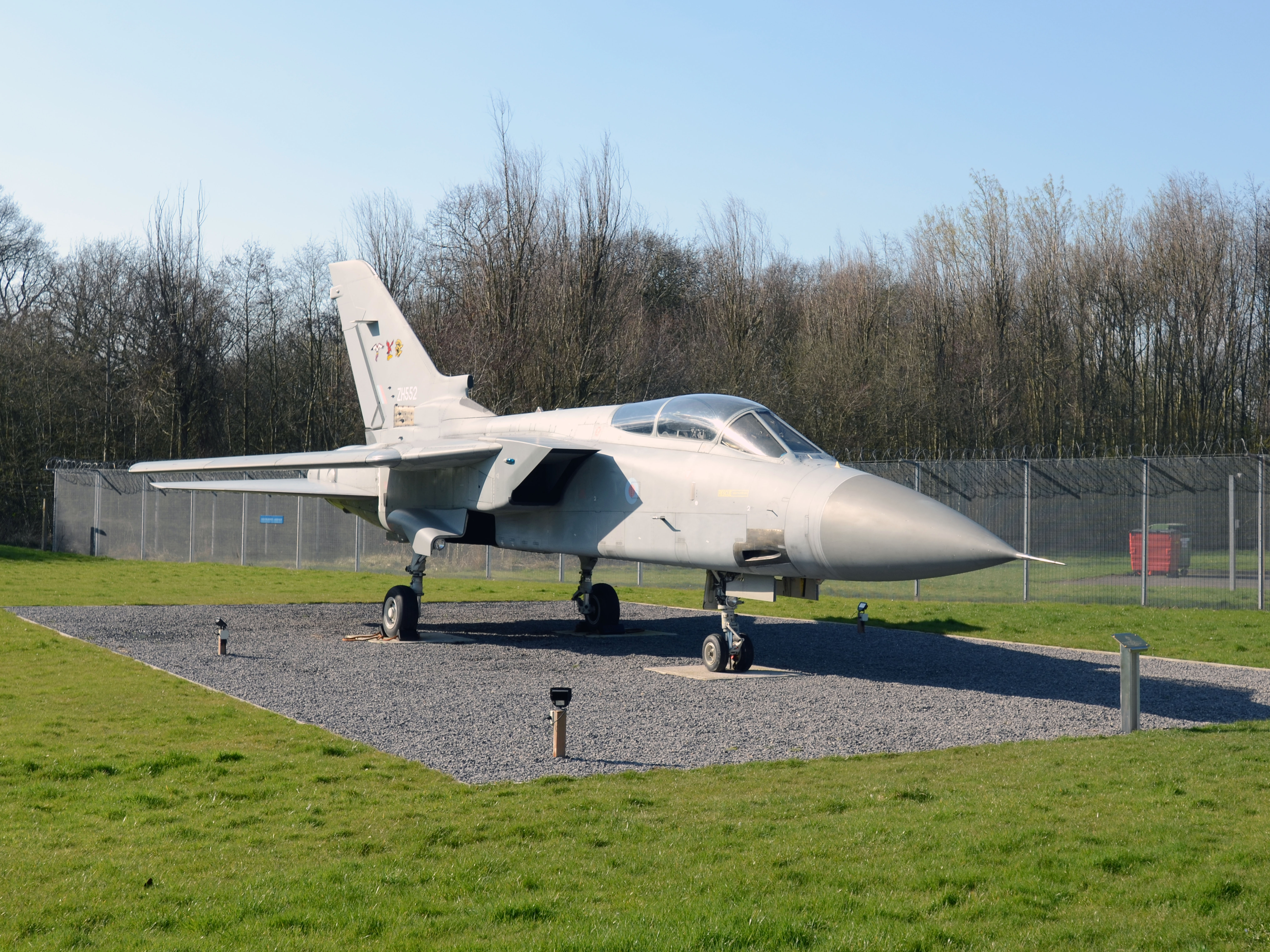
Tornado F3 ZH552 gate guardian of RAF Leeming

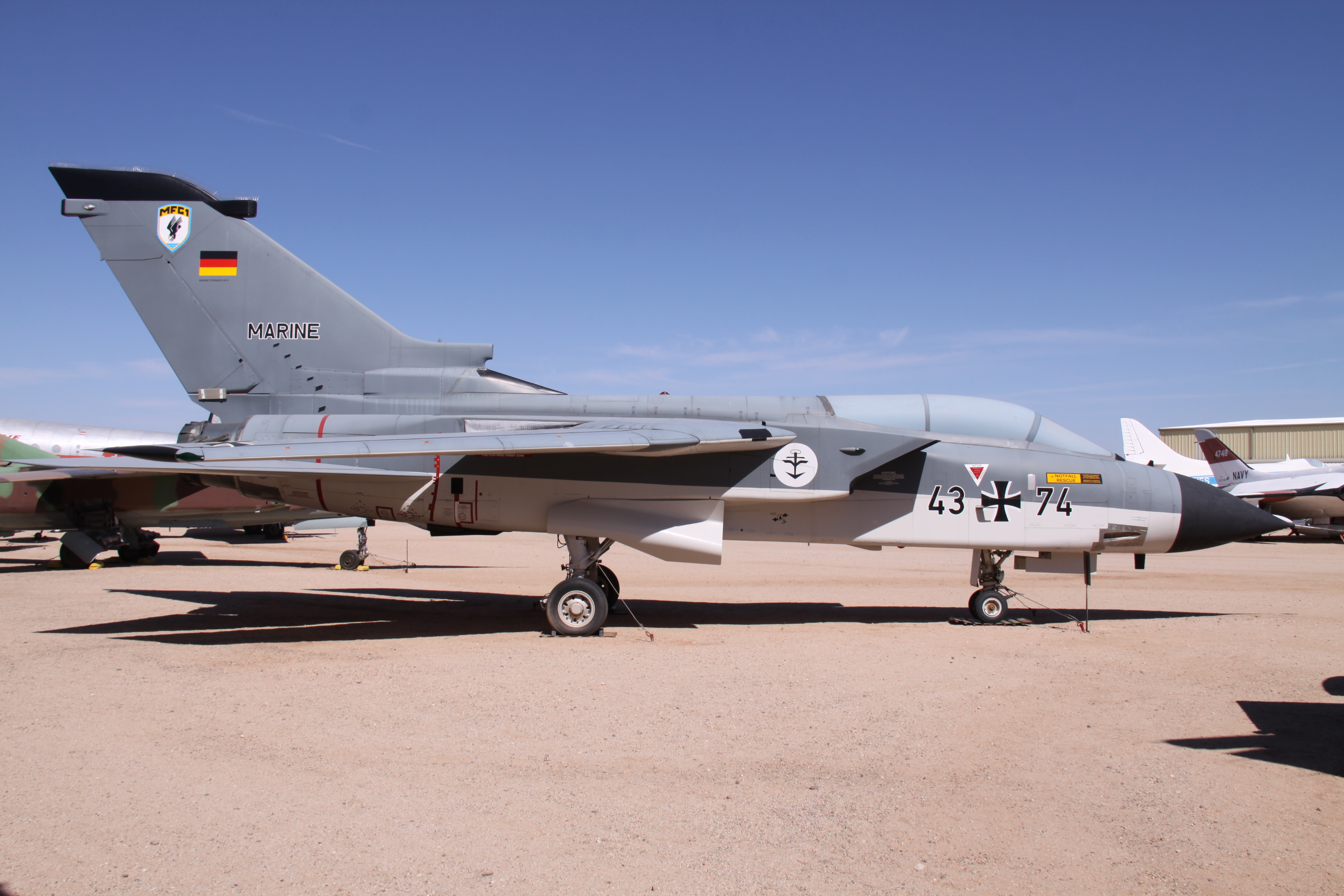
Tornado IDS 43+74 of the German Navy on display at the Pima Air & Space Museum, Arizona

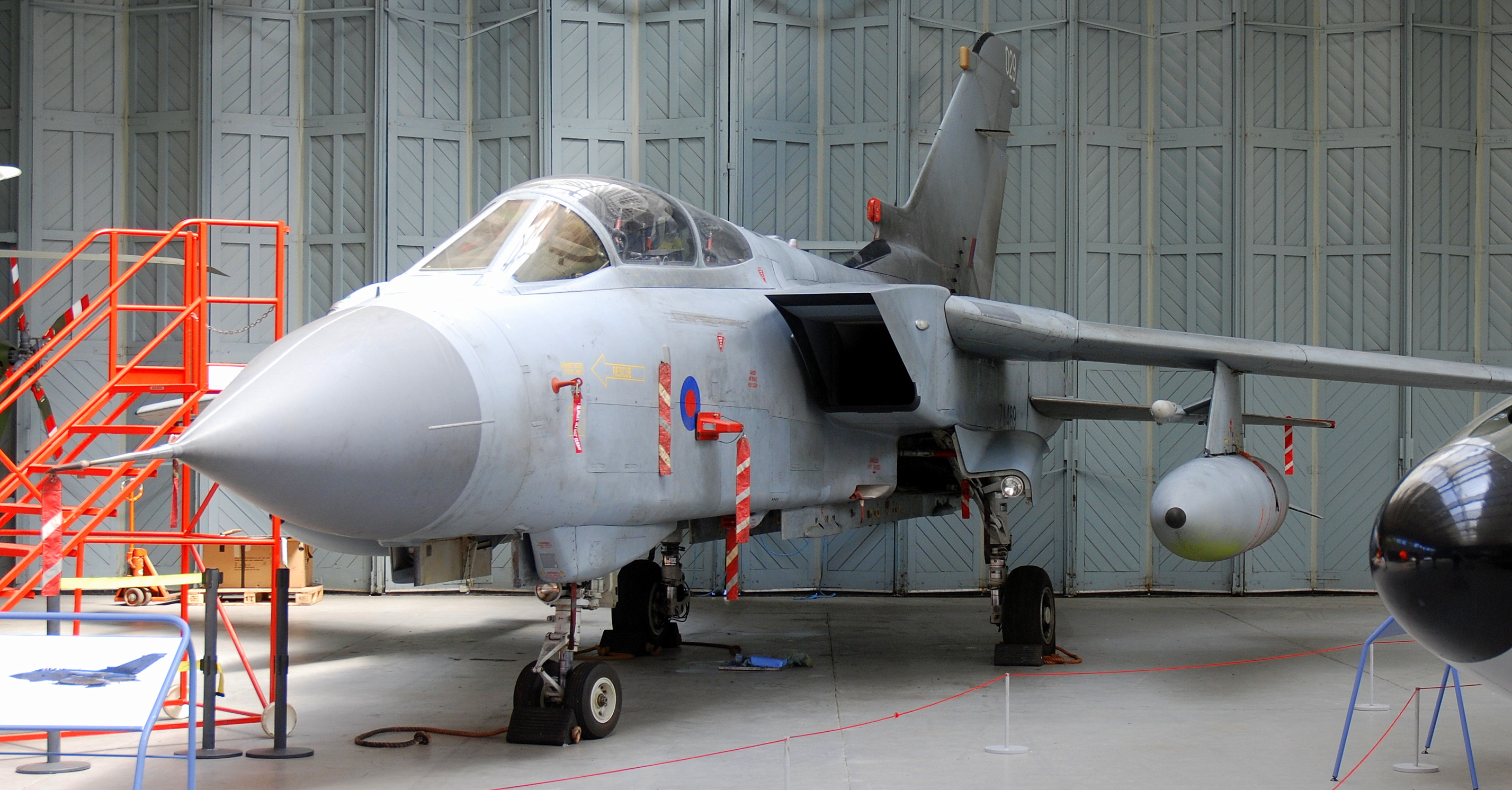
Tornado GR4 ZA469 at the Imperial War Museum Duxford

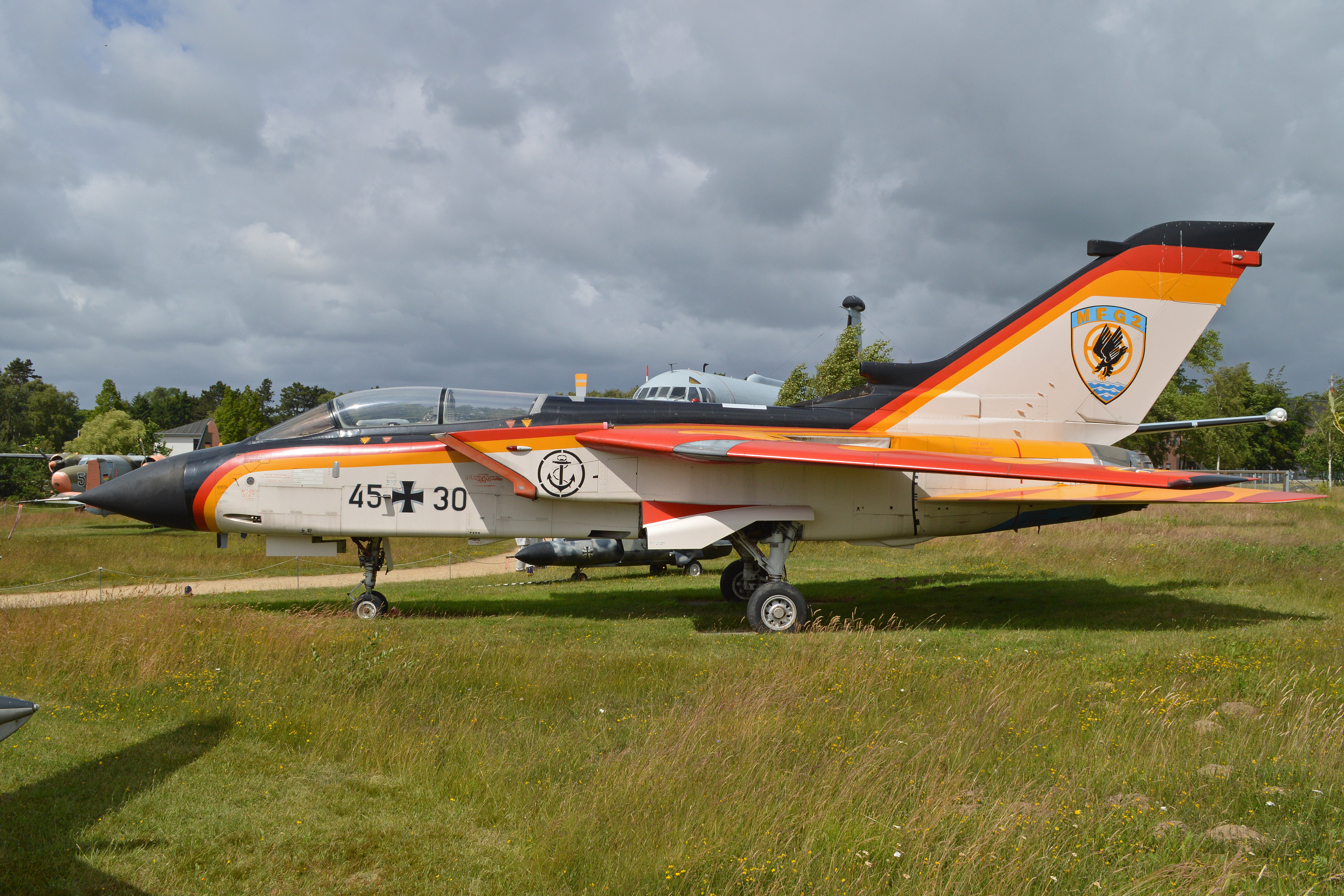
Tornado IDS 45+30 at Aeronauticum, Nordholz

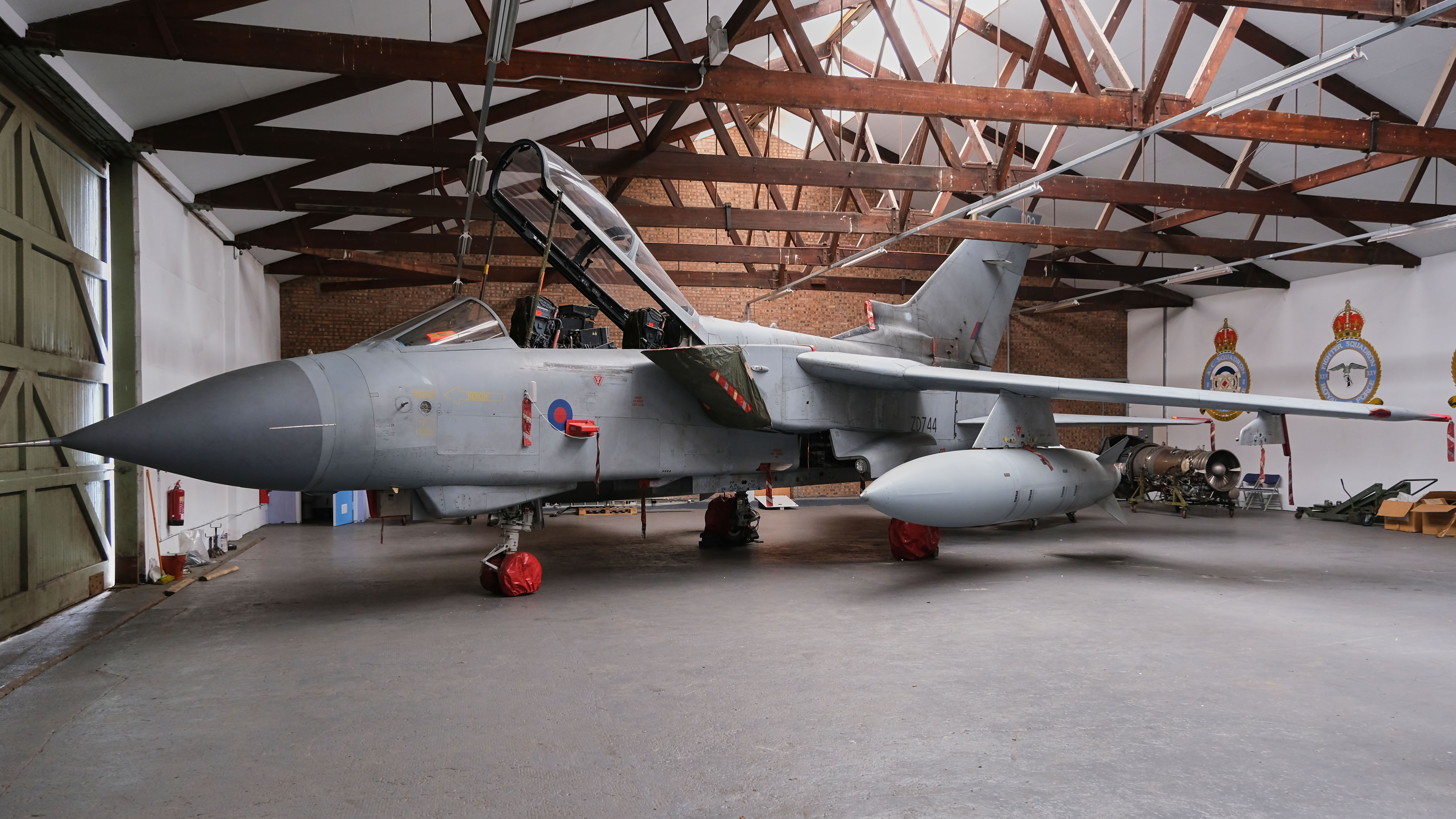
Panavia Tornado GR4 ZD744 at Montrose Air Station Heritage Centre

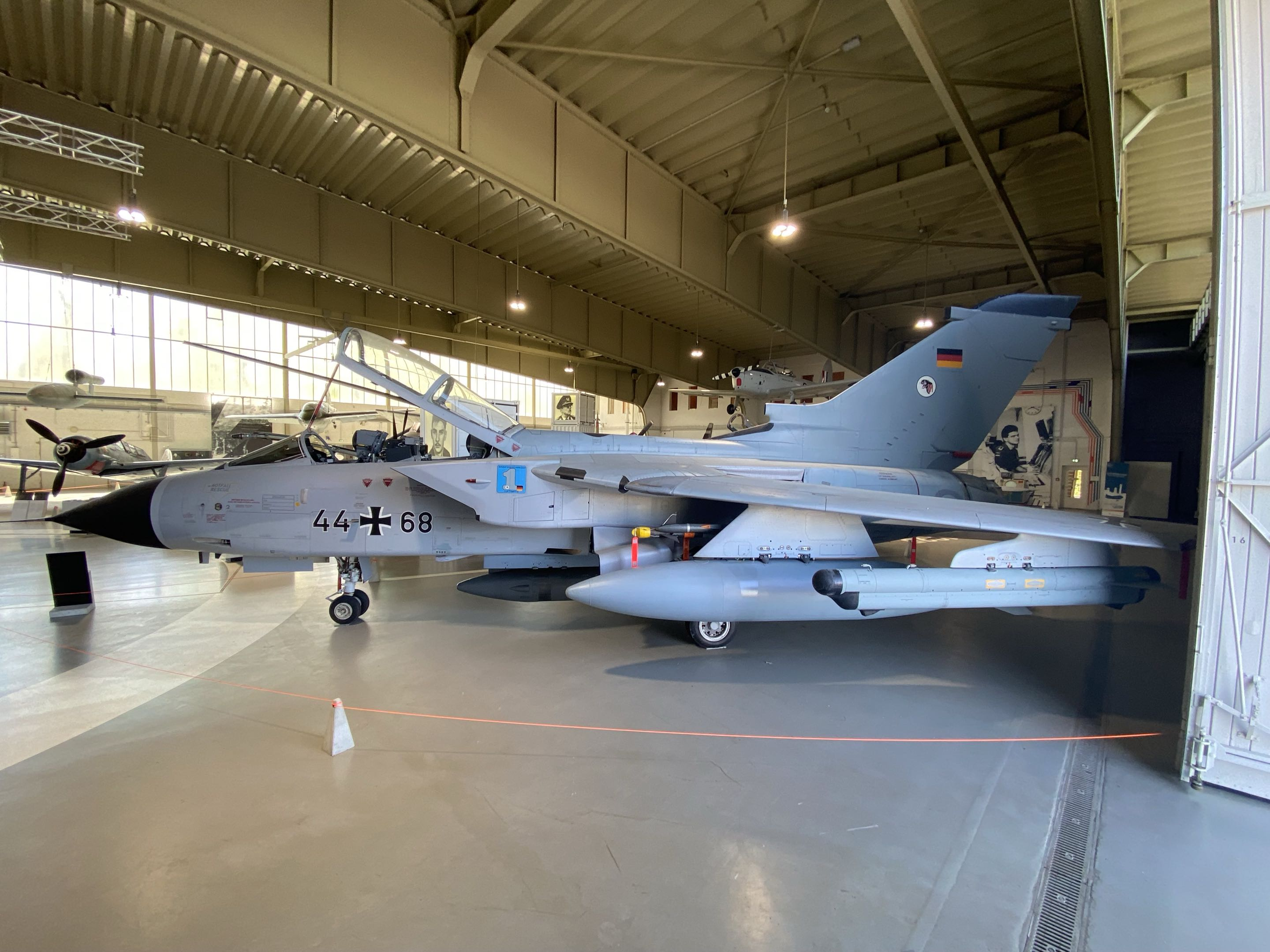
"D-9591" Tornado Prototype at Militärhistorisches Museum Flugplatz Berlin-Gatow

Australia

- ZG791 Tornado GR4 on display at Aviation Heritage Museum, Bull Creek, Western Australia.

Austria

- 44+66 Tornado IDS on display at Groß-Siegharts, Lower Austria.

Bulgaria

- 44+13 Tornado IDS on display at the National Museum of Military History, Sofia.

Estonia

- ZE256 Tornado F3 on display at the Estonian Aviation Museum, Lange.

Germany

- D-9591 Tornado Prototype P.01 on display at Militärhistorisches Museum Flugplatz Berlin-Gatow.
- XX948 Tornado Prototype P.06 on display at Hermeskeil.
- 43+55 Tornado IDS on display at Aeronauticum, Nordholz.
- 43+70 Tornado IDS on display at Büchel Air Base, Cochem.
- 43+86 Tornado IDS (MTU corporate design paint scheme) at MTU Aero Engines, Munich.
- 43+96 Tornado IDS on display at Wengerohr, Wittlich.
- 44+31 Tornado IDS (Blue Lightning paint scheme) of the 31st Fighter Bomber Wing "Boelcke" at Nörvenich AB.
- 44+35 Tornado IDS on display at the Cologne Bonn Airport, Cologne.
- 44+56 Tornado IDS on display at Fliegergeschichtliche Museum TG JaboG 34, Memmingen.
- 44+68 Tornado IDS on display at the Militärhistorisches Museum Flugplatz Berlin-Gatow.
- 44+84 Tornado IDS on display at Fürstenfeldbruck Air Base, Fürstenfeldbruck.
- 44+96 Tornado IDS gate guard at Schleswig Air Base in Jagel, near Schleswig.
- 44+97 Tornado IDS of the Einsatzgeschwader (Expeditionary Air Wing) Mazar-i-Sharif at the Deutsches Museum Flugwerft Schleissheim, Oberschleißheim.
- 45+30 Tornado IDS on display at Aeronauticum, Nordholz.
- 45+44 Tornado IDS gate guard at Büchel Air Base, Cochem.

Italy

- MM7001 Pre-production Tornado PS.14 on display at Cameri Air Base, Cameri.
- MM7046 Tornado A-200 gate guard at Ghedi Air Base, Brescia.
- MM7080 Tornado A-200 gate guard at Aviano Air Base, Pordenone.
- MM7210 (ex-ZE836) Tornado F3 on display at the Italian Air Force Museum, Vigna di Valle.

Netherlands

- XX947 Tornado Prototype P.03 on display at PS Aero, Baarlo, painted as 98+08 of the German Air Force.

Saudi Arabia

- 765 Tornado IDS on display at King Abdul-Aziz Air Base, Dhahran.
- 2915 Tornado ADV on display at the Royal Saudi Air Force Museum in Riyadh.

United Kingdom

- XX946 Tornado Prototype P.02 on display at the Royal Air Force Museum Midlands, England.
- XZ630 Pre-production Tornado P.12 on display as a GR4 on the parade ground at RAF Halton, Buckinghamshire, England.
- XZ631 Tornado GR4 Prototype P.15 on display at Yorkshire Air Museum, Elvington, England.
- ZA267 Tornado F2T on display at RAF Syerston, Nottinghamshire, England.
- ZA319 Tornado GR1T on display at the Boscombe Down Aviation Collection, Wiltshire, England.
- ZA326 Tornado GR1P on display at South Wales Aviation Museum, Vale of Glamorgan, Wales.
- ZA354 Tornado GR1 on display at Yorkshire Air Museum, Elvington, England.
- ZA357 Tornado GR1 on display at RAF Syerston, Nottinghamshire, England.
- ZA398 Tornado GR4A on display at Cornwall Aviation Heritage Centre, Cornwall, England
- ZA399 Tornado GR1 on display in Knutsford, Cheshire, England.
- ZA452 Tornado GR4 on display at Midland Air Museum, Coventry, England.
- ZA457 Tornado GR1B on display at Royal Air Force Museum London, Hendon, England.
- ZA463 Tornado GR4 on the gate at RAF Lossiemouth, Scotland
- ZA465 Tornado GR1 on display at Imperial War Museum, Duxford, England.
- ZA469 Tornado GR4 on display at Imperial War Museum, Duxford, England.
- ZA556 Tornado GR4 on display at the Defence Academy of the United Kingdom, Shrivenham, England.
- ZA607 Tornado GR4 on the gate at MoD Sealand, Wales.
- ZA614 Tornado GR4 on the gate at RAF Marham, Norfolk, England.
- ZD744 Tornado GR4 on display at Montrose Air Station Museum, Angus, Scotland.
- ZE204 Tornado F3 on display at the North East Land, Sea and Air Museums, Tyne and Wear, England.
- ZE760 Tornado F3 on the gate at RAF Coningsby, Lincolnshire, England.
- ZE887 Tornado F3 currently in storage at RAF Shawbury with plans to go on display at Royal Air Force Museum Cosford, England (currently planned for 2027).
- ZE934 Tornado F3 on display at National Museum of Flight, East Fortune, Scotland.
- ZE966 Tornado F3 on display at Tornado Heritage Centre, Hawarden Airport, Wales.
- ZE967 Tornado F3 on the gate at Leuchars Station, Fife, Scotland.
- ZG771 Tornado GR4 on display at Ulster Aviation Society, Lisburn, Northern Ireland.
- ZH552 Tornado F3 on display at RAF Leeming, North Yorkshire, England.

United States

- ZA374 Tornado GR1 on display at the National Museum of the United States Air Force, Wright Patterson AFB, Ohio.
- 43+74 Tornado IDS of the German Navy, Marinefliegergeschwader 1 at the Pima Air & Space Museum, Tucson, Arizona.
- 43+75 Tornado IDS on display at Holloman Air Force Base, New Mexico.
- 45+11 Tornado IDS on display at the New Mexico Museum of Space History, New Mexico.

== Accidents and incidents ==
- 13 January 1989: A British Panavia Tornado ZD891 of 14 Sqn at Bruggen, flying at 150 metres, hit a German military aircraft at 9.50am, of squadron Jagdbombergeschwader 43, and crashed near a village. Both RAF pilots were killed at Wiesmoor. The German pilot, Hermann Späth, aged 38, ejected.
- 9 August 1990: A Panavia Tornado IDS, tactical number 45+11 of the German Air Force was severely damaged on station of the Büchel Air Base.
- 13 January, 1991: A Panavia Tornado IDS crashed 140 miles west of Masirah Island, Oman. A person on the ground, along with the pilot died.
- 15 August, 1991: A Panavia Tornado IDS, tactical number 44+74 of the GAF crashed near Hühnerberg / Bad Ems. The aircraft was destroyed, no information about the crew.
- 19 October 1992: A Panavia Tornado crashed in the evening on the Nellis AFB, Nevada range, 100 miles NE of Las Vegas, during Red Flag combat exercises, killing two crew from the Italian Air Force.
- 1 September 1994: A Panavia Tornado based out of RAF Marham crashed during a training exercise in Scotland, killing both pilots. The crash was witnessed by Depeche Mode member Alan Wilder, who was driving on the road when the aircraft crashed nearby, and whose car was showered with debris from the impact.
- 28 April 1996: A Panavia Tornado IDS, tactical number 43+83 of the GAF was severely damaged during low level flight exercise at CFB Goose Bay, Canada.
- 24 August 1996: Two Panavia Tornados of the Luftwaffe crashed during low-level training exercises 80 miles west of CFB Goose Bay killing one pilot.
- 3 February 1998: A German Panavia Tornado, coded 4482, crashed near Lippstadt. Both crew members saved themselves with the ejection seat.
- 21 January 1999: Royal Air Force Panavia Tornado GR.1 ZA330, 'coded B-08', crashed into a Cessna 152 II, G-BPZX near Mattersey, Nottinghamshire. In the Air Accident Report 3/2000 the conclusion was none of the pilots saw each other in time to take avoiding action. Both crew of the Tornado as well as the pilot and passenger in the Cessna, were killed.
- 30 July 1999: A Panavia Tornado IDS, tactical number 45+05 of the GAF crashed near Engeløya, Norway during a NATO exercise.
- 23 March 2001: A German Air Force Panavia Tornado IDS of Jagdbombergeschwader 34 crashed 180 kilometres (110 mi) northwest of Nellis Air Force Base, Nevada, United States, in the Nevada Test and Training Range, during a low-level attack at night which was being flown as part of Exercise Red Flag. The pilot and the weapon systems officer, both of Jagdbombergeschwader 33, were killed in the crash.
- 22 March 2003: A RAF Tornado GR4 ZG710 was shot down by a US Patriot Missile Battery, killing both crew. It later emerged that the primary cause (failure to properly integrate IFF) had been identified in 1998 but corrective action rejected.
- 24 October, 2006: A Royal Air Force Tornado GR4 from RAF Marham in Norfolk, eastern England, crashed at around 1100 GMT during a routine practice training exercise at RAF Holbeach Bombing Range located in Lincolnshire. The aircraft wreckage scattered across tidal mud flats located on The Wash bombing range. Both airmen ejected from the aircraft and were rescued by two scrambled RAF Westland Sea King helicopters from Wattisham Airfield and RAF Leconfield. The pilot and navigator were flown to Queen Elizabeth Hospital in King's Lynn, their condition was not thought to be life-threatening, but were being assessed as standard procedure and whether or not there had been any stress to their Vertebral column. Bird strike was thought at the time of the incident to have caused the crash, resulting in the aircraft's sudden engine failure.
- 12 April 2007: An unarmed Panavia Tornado ECR of the German Air Force crashed into a rock face 46.550328°N 7.923805°E near Lauterbrunnen, Switzerland, killing the pilot. The weapons system officer ejected and was rescued from the rock face, severely injured, by a local helicopter rescue team. The crash occurred minutes after refueling in Emmen during an authorized navigation training in the Swiss Alps while returning to Germany from a long-distance flight to Corsica, France.
- 23 March 2009: A German Air Force Panavia Tornado, 45+37, from Jagdbombergeschwader 33 crashed on the runway at Büchel Air Force Base, Rhineland-Palatinate, Germany. The aircraft, on a routine night training exercise, suffered extensive damage during the incident which occurred in high winds and rain. The two crew members ejected safely.
- 2 July, 2009: A Royal Air Force Panavia Tornado F.3 crashed near the Rest and Be Thankful beauty spot in Glen Kinglass, Arrochar, Scotland. The aircraft was on a routine training flight from No. 43 Squadron RAF Leuchars in Fife resulting in 2 crew killed in the accident. The crew were pilot Kenneth Thompson and weapons systems officer Nigel Morton.
- 20 July 2009: A Royal Air Force Panavia Tornado GR.4 operating with RAF No. 12 Squadron crashed on take-off at Kandahār International Airport in Afghanistan and the two crew members successfully ejected from the aircraft.
- 3 July 2012: Two RAF Panavia Tornado GR.4Ts, ZD743 and ZD812 collided in mid-air and crashed in the Moray Firth, Scotland. Three of the four crew were killed.
- 19 August 2012: Two Italian Air Force Panavia Tornado aircraft collided and crashed near Venarotta, Marche, Italy, killing both pilots and both weapon-system officers.

== Specifications (Tornado GR4) ==
Panavia Tornado IDS 3-view drawing

Data from International Warbirds: An Illustrated Guide to World Military Aircraft, 1914–2000,Tornado, Modern Fighting Aircraft

General characteristics

- Crew: 2
- Length: 16.72 m (54 ft 10 in)
- Wingspan: 13.91 m (45 ft 8 in) at 25° sweep
- Swept wingspan: 8.60 m (28 ft 3 in) swept at 67° sweep
- Height: 5.95 m (19 ft 6 in)
- Wing area: 26.6 m^{2} (286 sq ft)
- Empty weight: 13,890 kg (30,622 lb)
- Gross weight: 20,410 kg (44,996 lb)
- Max takeoff weight: 27,215 kg (59,999 lb)
- Fuel capacity: 6,350 kg (14,000 lb) internal
- Powerplant: 2 × Turbo-Union RB199-34R Mk 103 afterburning 3-spool turbofan, 43.8 kN (9,800 lbf) thrust each dry, 76.8 kN (17,300 lbf) with afterburner

Performance

- Maximum speed: 2,400 km/h (1,500 mph, 1,300 kn) at 9,000 m (30,000 ft) (Note: with operable variable intake ramps, which have been inhibited on the majority of Tornado aircraft except ADV variants)

1,482 km/h (921 mph; 800 kn) IAS near sea level

- Maximum speed: Mach 2.2
- Combat range: 3,148 km (1,956 mi, 1,700 nmi) Combat radius Hi-Lo-Hi >850 nmi (>1574 km), combat radius Lo-Lo-Lo >500 nmi (>926 km), Hi-Hi-Hi with 1 hour loiter >700 nmi (> 1296 km).
- Ferry range: 3,890 km (2,420 mi, 2,100 nmi)
- Service ceiling: 15,240 m (50,000 ft)
- Time to altitude: 30,000 ft in less than 2 minutes from brake release
- Wing loading: 767 kg/m^{2} (157 lb/sq ft)
- Thrust/weight: 0.77

Armament

- Guns: 1 × 27 mm (1.06 in) Mauser BK-27 revolver cannon internally mounted under starboard side of fuselage with 180 rounds (Note: 2 ×, each with 180 rounds in GR.1, GR.1B, and IDS)
- Hardpoints: 3 × under-fuselage and 4 × under-wing pylon stations (Note: the two inner wing pylons have shoulder launch rails for 2 × short-range air-to-air missiles each) with a capacity of 9,000 kg (19,800 lb), with provisions to carry combinations of:
  - Missiles:
    - 2 × AIM-9 Sidewinder (AIM-9B / AIM-9G / AIM-9L) (GR.1) or AIM-132 ASRAAM air-to-air missiles for self-defence (GR.4)
    - 12 × Brimstone air-to-surface missile; or
    - 2 × Storm Shadow cruise missile
    - 9 × ALARM anti-radiation missile
  - Bombs:
    - 5 × 500 lb (230 kg) Paveway IV; or
    - 3 × 1,000 lb (450 kg) (UK Mk 20) Paveway II/Enhanced Paveway II; or
    - 2 × 2,000 lb (910 kg) Paveway III (GBU-24)/Enhanced Paveway III (EGBU-24); or
    - BL755 cluster bombs; or
    - Up to 2 × JP233 or MW-1 or Skyshark munitions dispensers (for runway cratering operations)
    - Up to 4 × B61 or WE.177 tactical nuclear weapons
  - Other: Up to 4 × drop tanks for ferry flight/extended range/flight time

Avionics

- RAPTOR aerial reconnaissance pod
- Rafael LITENING targeting pod; or
- TIALD laser designator pod
- GEC Sky Shadow, CERBERUS II/III, and Tornado Self-Protection Jammer (TSPJ) electronic countermeasure pods
- BOZ counter-measures pod

== See also ==
- Future Combat Air System
- Wild Weasel

Related development

- Panavia Tornado ADV

Aircraft of comparable role, configuration, and era

- Dassault Mirage 2000
- General Dynamics F-111 Aardvark
- Grumman F-14 Tomcat
- McDonnell Douglas F-15 Eagle
- Mikoyan MiG-27
- Sukhoi Su-24
- Xian JH-7

Related lists

- List of military aircraft of Germany
- List of active Italian military aircraft
- List of aircraft of the Royal Air Force
