= List of airports in Germany =

This is a list of airports in Germany, sorted by location.

== List ==
Map of German domestic flights per year as of 2015

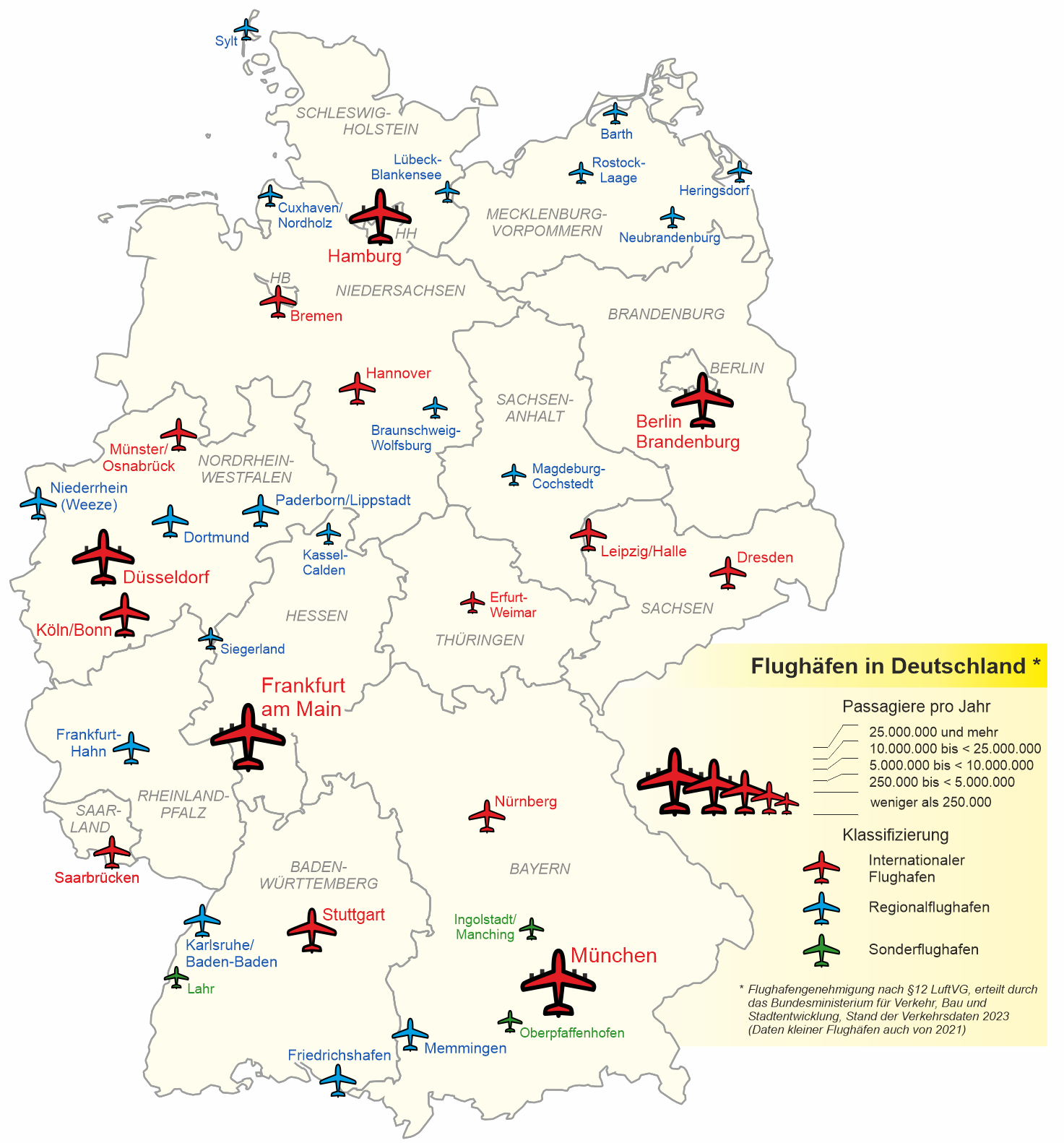
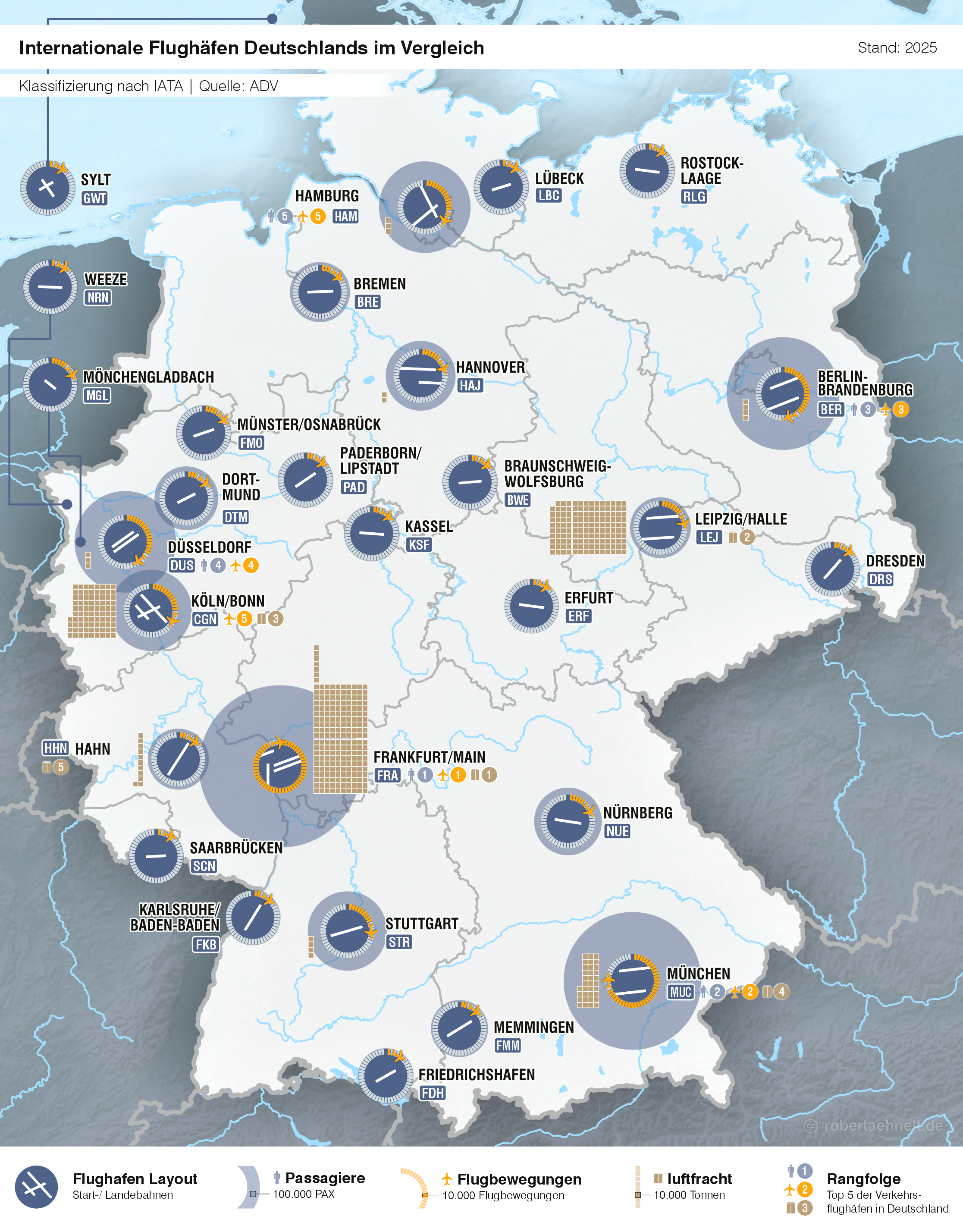
Map of airports in Germany and comparison of international airports

Airport names shown in bold indicate the facility has scheduled passenger service on a commercial airline.

Location served	State	ICAO	IATA	Airport name
**Civil airports**
Aachen	North Rhine-Westphalia	EDKA	AAH	Aachen Merzbrück Airfield
Allendorf	Hesse	EDFQ		Allendorf Airport
Altenburg	Thuringia	EDAC	AOC	Leipzig–Altenburg Airport (formerly Altenburg–Nobitz Airport)
Augsburg	Bavaria	EDMA	AGB	Augsburg Airport
Bad Gandersheim	Lower Saxony	EDVA		Bad Gandersheim Aerodrome
Bad Kissingen	Bavaria	EDFK		Bad Kissingen Airfield
Bamberg	Bavaria	EDQA / ~~ETEJ~~	ZCD	Bamberg-Breitenau Airfield (formerly Bamberg Army Airfield (US Army))
Barth / Stralsund	Mecklenburg-Vorpommern	EDBH	BBH	Stralsund–Barth Airport
Berlin	Brandenburg	EDDB	BER	**Berlin Brandenburg Airport**
Bindlach / Bayreuth	Bavaria	EDQD	BYU	Bayreuth Airport
Bitburg	Rhineland-Palatinate	EDRB	BBJ	Bitburg Airport
Borkum	Lower Saxony	EDWR	BMK	**Borkum Airfield**
Bramsche	Lower Saxony	EDXA		Achmer Aerodrome
Braunschweig	Lower Saxony	EDVE	BWE	Braunschweig Wolfsburg Airport
Bremen	Free Hanseatic City of Bremen	EDDW	BRE	**Bremen Airport**
Cologne / Bonn	North Rhine-Westphalia	EDDK	CGN	**Cologne Bonn Airport**
Cuxhaven / Nordholz	Lower Saxony	ETMN	FCN	Sea-Airport Cuxhaven/Nordholz
Dortmund	North Rhine-Westphalia	EDLW	DTM	**Dortmund Airport**
Dresden / Klotzsche	Saxony	EDDC	DRS	**Dresden Airport** (Dresden-Klotzsche Airport)
Düsseldorf	North Rhine-Westphalia	EDDL	DUS	**Düsseldorf Airport**
Düsseldorf / Mönchengladbach	North Rhine-Westphalia	EDLN	MGL	Mönchengladbach Airport
Egelsbach	Hesse	EDFE		Frankfurt Egelsbach Airport
Emden	Lower Saxony	EDWE	EME	**Emden Airport**
Erfurt	Thuringia	EDDE	ERF	**Erfurt–Weimar Airport**
Essen / Mülheim	North Rhine-Westphalia	EDLE	ESS	Essen/Mülheim Airport
Frankfurt am Main	Hesse	EDDF	FRA	**Frankfurt Airport** (Frankfurt am Main Airport, also: Rhein-Main Airport)
Freiburg im Breisgau	Baden-Württemberg	EDTF	QFB	Freiburg Airport
Friedrichshafen	Baden-Württemberg	EDNY	FDH	**Friedrichshafen Airport** (Bodensee Airport, Friedrichshafen)
Giebelstadt	Bavaria	EDQG / ~~ETEU~~	~~GHF~~	Giebelstadt Airport (formerly Giebelstadt Army Airfield)
Hahn	Rhineland-Palatinate	EDFH	HHN	**Frankfurt–Hahn Airport**
Hamburg / Fuhlsbüttel	Hamburg	EDDH	HAM	**Hamburg Airport** (Hamburg-Fuhlsbüttel Airport)
Hamburg / Finkenwerder	Hamburg	EDHI	XFW	Airbus Hamburg-Finkenwerder
Hannover	Lower Saxony	EDDV	HAJ	**Hannover Airport**
Heide	Schleswig-Holstein	EDXB	HEI	**Heide–Büsum Airport**
Heist	Schleswig-Holstein	EDHE		**Uetersen Airfield**
Heligoland / Düne	Schleswig-Holstein	EDXH	HGL	**Heligoland Airfield** (Helgoland-Düne Airfield)
Heringsdorf	Mecklenburg-Vorpommern	EDAH	HDF	**Heringsdorf Airport**
Hof	Bavaria	EDQM	HOQ	Hof–Plauen Airport
Hoppstädten	Rhineland-Palatinate	EDRH		Hoppstädten-Weiersbach Airfield
Ingolstadt	Bavaria	ETSI	IGS	Ingolstadt Manching Airport
Juist	Lower Saxony	EDWJ	JUI	**Juist Airfield**
Karlsruhe / Baden-Baden	Baden-Württemberg	EDSB	FKB	**Karlsruhe/Baden-Baden Airport**
Kassel	Hesse	EDVK	KSF	**Kassel Airport**
Kiel	Schleswig-Holstein	EDHK	KEL	Kiel Airport (Kiel Holtenau Airport)
Lahr	Baden-Württemberg	EDTL	LHA	Lahr Airport
Langenlonsheim	Rhineland-Palatinate	EDEL		Langenlonsheim Airfield
Leipzig	Saxony	EDDP	LEJ	**Leipzig/Halle Airport**
Lübeck	Schleswig-Holstein	EDHL	LBC	**Lübeck Airport** (Blankensee Airport)
Magdeburg	Saxony-Anhalt	EDBC	CSO	Magdeburg–Cochstedt Airport
Mainz	Rhineland-Palatinate	EDFZ		Flugplatz Mainz-Finthen
Mannheim	Baden-Württemberg	EDFM	MHG	**Mannheim City Airport**
Memmingen / Allgäu	Bavaria	EDJA	FMM	**Memmingen Airport** (formerly Allgäu Airport/Memmingen)
Munich	Bavaria	EDDM	MUC	**Munich Airport**
Münster / Osnabrück	North Rhine-Westphalia	EDDG	FMO	**Münster Osnabrück Airport**
Nannhausen / Simmern	Rhineland-Palatinate	EDRN		Nannhausen Airfield
Neubrandenburg	Mecklenburg-Vorpommern	EDBN / ~~ETNU~~	FNB	Neubrandenburg Airport
Norden	Lower Saxony	EDWS	NOE	**Norden-Norddeich Airfield**
Norderney	Lower Saxony	EDWY	NRD	**Norderney Airport**
Nuremberg	Bavaria	EDDN	NUE	**Nuremberg Airport**
Osnabrück	Lower Saxony	EDWO		Atterheide Airfield
Paderborn / Lippstadt	North Rhine-Westphalia	EDLP	PAD	**Paderborn Lippstadt Airport**
Parchim	Mecklenburg-Vorpommern	EDOP	SZW	Parchim International Airport
Rechlin	Mecklenburg-Vorpommern	EDAX	REB	Müritz Airpark (formerly Rechlin–Lärz Airfield)
Rostock	Mecklenburg-Vorpommern	ETNL	RLG	**Rostock–Laage Airport**
Saarbrücken	Saarland	EDDR	SCN	**Saarbrücken Airport** (Ensheim Airport)
Sankt Peter-Ording	Schleswig-Holstein	EDXO	PSH	Sankt Peter-Ording Airport
Siegen	North Rhine-Westphalia	EDGS	SGE	Siegerland Airport
Stadtlohn	North Rhine-Westphalia	EDLS		Stadtlohn-Vreden Airport
Straubing	Bavaria	EDMS	RBM	Straubing Wallmühle Airport
Stuttgart	Baden-Württemberg	EDDS	STR	**Stuttgart Airport** (formerly Stuttgart Army Airfield, Stuttgart Echterdingen Airport)
Trier / Föhren	Rhineland-Palatinate	EDRT		Trier-Föhren Airfield
Wangerland	Lower Saxony	EDXP		**Harle Airfield**
Wangerooge	Lower Saxony	EDWG	AGE	**Wangerooge Airfield**
Weeze	North Rhine-Westphalia	EDLV	NRN	**Weeze Airport** (Niederrhein Airport)
Westerland, Sylt	Schleswig-Holstein	EDXW	GWT	**Sylt Airport**
Wilhelmshaven	Lower Saxony	EDWI	WVN	JadeWeser Airport
Zweibrücken	Rhineland-Palatinate	EDRZ	ZQW	Zweibrücken Airport
**Military airports**
Altenstadt	Bavaria	ETHA		Altenstadt Air Base (Army)
Baumholder	Rhineland-Palatinate	ETEK		Baumholder Army Airfield (U.S. Army)
Büchel	Rhineland-Palatinate	ETSB		Büchel Air Base (Air Force)
Bückeburg	Lower Saxony	ETHB		Bückeburg Air Base (Army)
Celle	Lower Saxony	ETHC	ZCN	Celle Air Base (Army)
Diepholz	Lower Saxony	ETND		Diepholz Air Base (Air Force)
Erding	Bavaria	ETSE		Erding Air Base (Air Force)
Faßberg (Fassberg)	Lower Saxony	ETHS		Faßberg Air Base (Army)
Fritzlar	Hesse	ETHF	FRZ	Fritzlar Air Base (Army)
Fürstenfeldbruck	Bavaria	ETSF	FEL	Fürstenfeldbruck Air Base (Air Force)
Geilenkirchen	North Rhine-Westphalia	ETNG	GKE	NATO Air Base Geilenkirchen (NATO)
Grafenwöhr	Bavaria	ETIC		Grafenwöhr Army Airfield (U.S. Army)
Hohenfels	Bavaria	ETIH		Hohenfels Army Airfield (U.S. Army)
Hohn	Schleswig-Holstein	ETNH		Hohn Air Base (Air Force)
Holzdorf / Schönewalde	Saxony-Anhalt / Brandenburg	ETSH		Holzdorf Air Base (Air Force)
Jever	Lower Saxony	ETNJ		Jever Air Base (Air Force)
Landsberg am Lech	Bavaria	ETSA		Landsberg-Lech Air Base (Air Force)
Laupheim	Baden-Württemberg	ETHL		Laupheim Air Base (Air Force)
Klosterlechfeld	Bavaria	ETSL		Lechfeld Air Base (Air Force)
Mannheim	Baden-Württemberg	ETOR		Coleman Army Airfield (U.S. Army)
Meppen	Lower Saxony	ETWM		Meppen Air Base (Air Force)
Neuburg an der Donau	Bavaria	ETSN		Neuburg Air Base (Air Force)
Niederstetten	Baden-Württemberg	ETHN		Niederstetten Air Base (Army)
Nordholz	Lower Saxony	ETMN	NDZ	Nordholz Naval Airbase (Navy)
Nörvenich	North Rhine-Westphalia	ETNN	QOE	Nörvenich Air Base (Air Force)
Ramstein-Miesenbach	Rhineland-Palatinate	ETAR	RMS	Ramstein Air Base (U.S. Air Force)
Rheine	North Rhine-Westphalia	ETHE	ZPQ	Rheine-Bentlage Air Base (Army)
Roth	Bavaria	ETHR		Roth Air Base (Army)
Schleswig / Jagel	Schleswig-Holstein	ETNS	WBG	Schleswig Air Base (Air Force)
Spangdahlem	Rhineland-Palatinate	ETAD	SPM	Spangdahlem Air Base (U.S. Air Force)
Wiesbaden	Hesse	ETOU	WIE	Lucius D. Clay Kaserne (formerly Wiesbaden Air Base) (U.S. Army)
Wittmund	Lower Saxony	ETNT		Wittmundhafen Air Base (Air Force)
Wunstorf	Lower Saxony	ETNW		Wunstorf Air Base (Air Force)
**Former airports**
Berlin	Brandenburg	~~EDDB~~	~~SXF~~	Berlin Schönefeld Airport (closed October 2020)
Berlin	Berlin	~~EDDT~~	~~TXL~~	Berlin Tegel Airport (closed 8 November 2020)
Berlin	Berlin	~~EDDI~~	~~THF~~	Berlin Tempelhof Airport (closed October 2008)
Bremerhaven	Free Hanseatic City of Bremen	~~EDWB~~	~~BRV~~	Bremerhaven Airport (closed February 2016)
Cologne	North Rhine-Westphalia	~~ETBB~~		Cologne Butzweilerhof Airport (closed 1996)
Cottbus	Brandenburg	~~EDCD~~	~~CBU~~	Cottbus-Drewitz Airport (closed January 2020)
Hopsten	North Rhine-Westphalia	~~ETNP~~		Rheine-Hopsten Air Base (closed 2005)
Munich	Bavaria	~~EDDM~~	~~MUC~~	Munich-Riem Airport (closed May 1992)

== See also ==
- List of airports by ICAO code: EB-EG#ED ET - Germany
- List of the busiest airports in Germany
- List of the busiest airports in Europe
- Transport in Germany
- Wikipedia:WikiProject Aviation/Airline destination lists: Europe#Germany
