= Heide–Büsum Airport =

Small airport in Germany

Heide–Büsum Airport Flugplatz Heide-Büsum
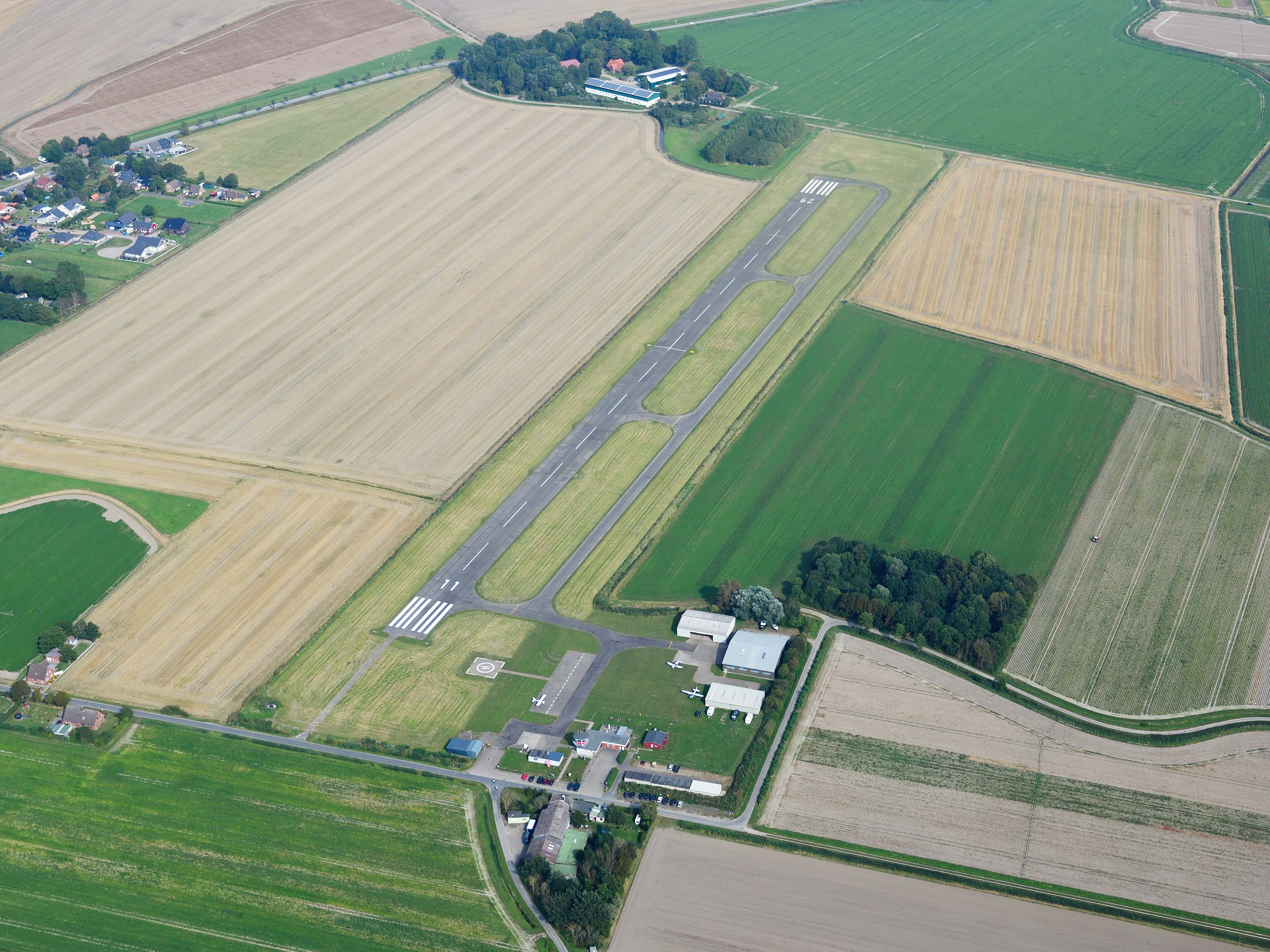
- IATA: HEI; ICAO: EDXB

Summary
- Airport type: Public
- Operator: Flugplatz Heide-Büsum GmbH
- Serves: Heide, Germany
- Location: Büsum
- Elevation AMSL: 2 m / 7 ft
- Coordinates: 54°09′13″N 008°53′55″E
- Website: www.edxb.de

Map
- Location of the airport in Schleswig-Holstein

Runways
Direction	Length		Surface
Direction	m	ft	Surface
11L/29R	720	2,362	Asphalt
- Sources: AIRPORTS.DE, ASN

Heide–Büsum Airport (German: Flugplatz Heide-Büsum) (IATA: HEI, ICAO: EDXB) is an airport serving Heide, a town in the Dithmarschen district in the German state of Schleswig-Holstein. The airport is located 1.6 nautical miles (3 km) northeast of Büsum, a town located about 18 kilometres (11 mi) southwest of Heide.

== Facilities ==
The airport is at an elevation of 7 feet (2 m) above mean sea level. It has one runway designated 11/29 with an asphalt surface measuring 720 by 23 metres (2,362 ft × 75 ft).

== Airlines and destinations ==
The following airlines offer regular scheduled and charter flights at Heide–Büsum Airport:

Airlines	Destinations
OFD Ostfriesischer Flugdienst	Heligoland

== See also ==
- Transport in Germany
- List of airports in Germany
