= Borkum Airfield =

Airfield serving Borkum island, Lower Saxony, Germany

Borkum Airfield Flugplatz Borkum
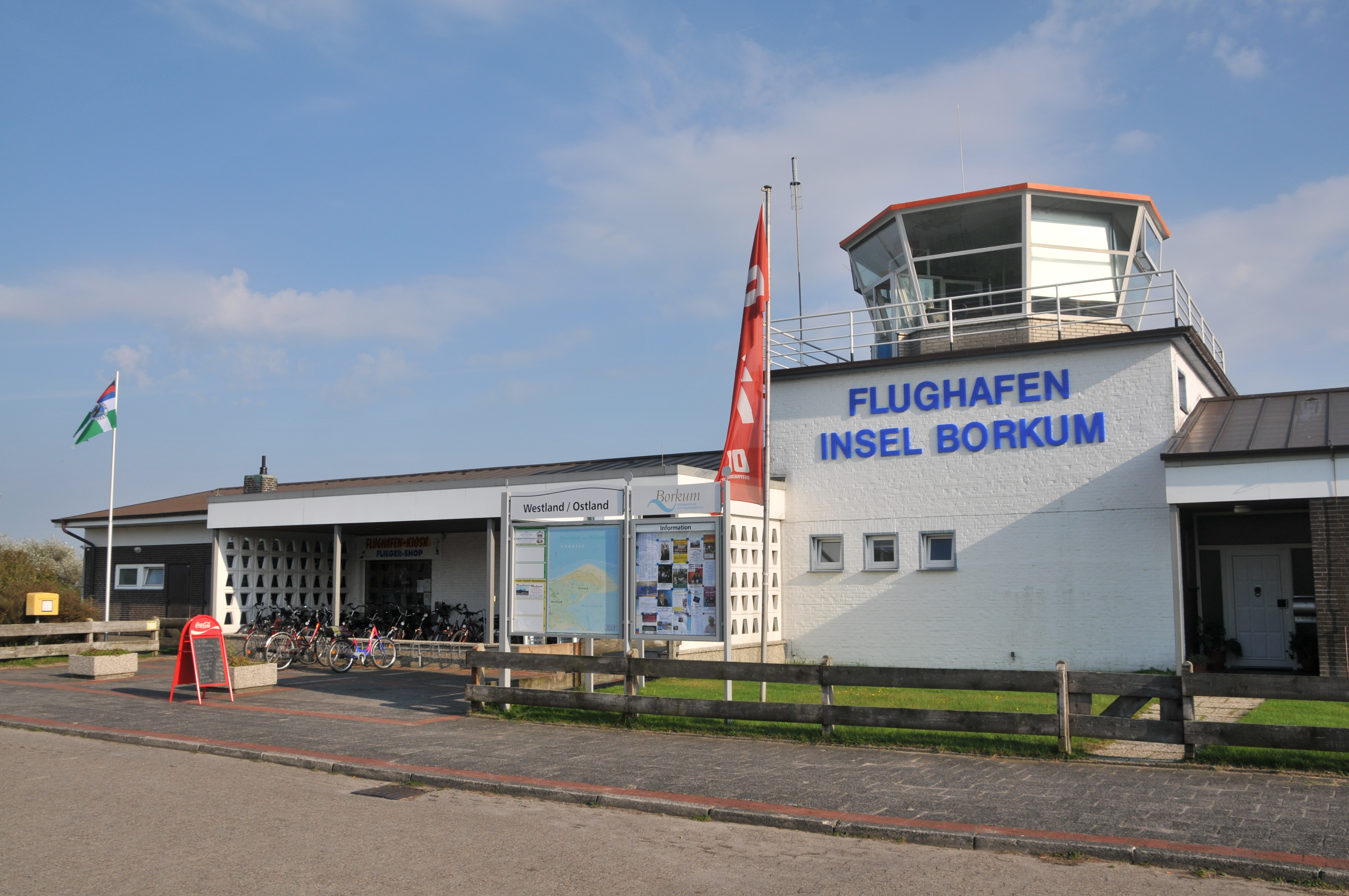
- IATA: BMK; ICAO: EDWR

Summary
- Airport type: Public
- Operator: Wirtschaftsbetriebe der Stadt Borkum GmbH
- Serves: Borkum, Germany
- Elevation AMSL: 3 ft (0.91 m)
- Coordinates: 53°35′44″N 006°42′33″E
- Website: borkum.de

Map
- Location of the airport in Lower Saxony

Runways
Direction	Length		Surface
Direction	m	ft	Surface
13/31	1,000	3,281	Asphalt
12/30	870 ^{†}	2,854 ^{†}	Grass
05/23	810	2,657	Grass
- ^{†} 700 m (2,300 ft): landings on 12/takeoff on 30. Sources: AIRPORTS.DE, DAFIF

Borkum Airfield (German: Flugplatz Borkum) (IATA: BMK, ICAO: EDWR) is an airfield serving Borkum, an island and a municipality in the Leer district in the German state of Lower Saxony.

== Facilities ==
The airport lies at an elevation of 3 feet (1 m) above mean sea level. It has one asphalt-paved runway designated 13/31 which measures 1,000 by 20 metres (3,281 ft × 66 ft). It also has two grass runways: 12/30 is 870 by 40 metres (2,854 ft × 131 ft) and 05/23 is 810 by 40 metres (2,657 ft × 131 ft).

== Airlines and destinations ==
The following airlines offer regular scheduled and charter flights at Borkum Airfield:

Airlines	Destinations
OFD Ostfriesischer Flugdienst	Emden

== See also ==
- Transport in Germany
- List of airports in Germany
