= Sankt Peter-Ording Airport =

Sankt Peter-Ording Airfield Flugplatz St. Peter-Ording
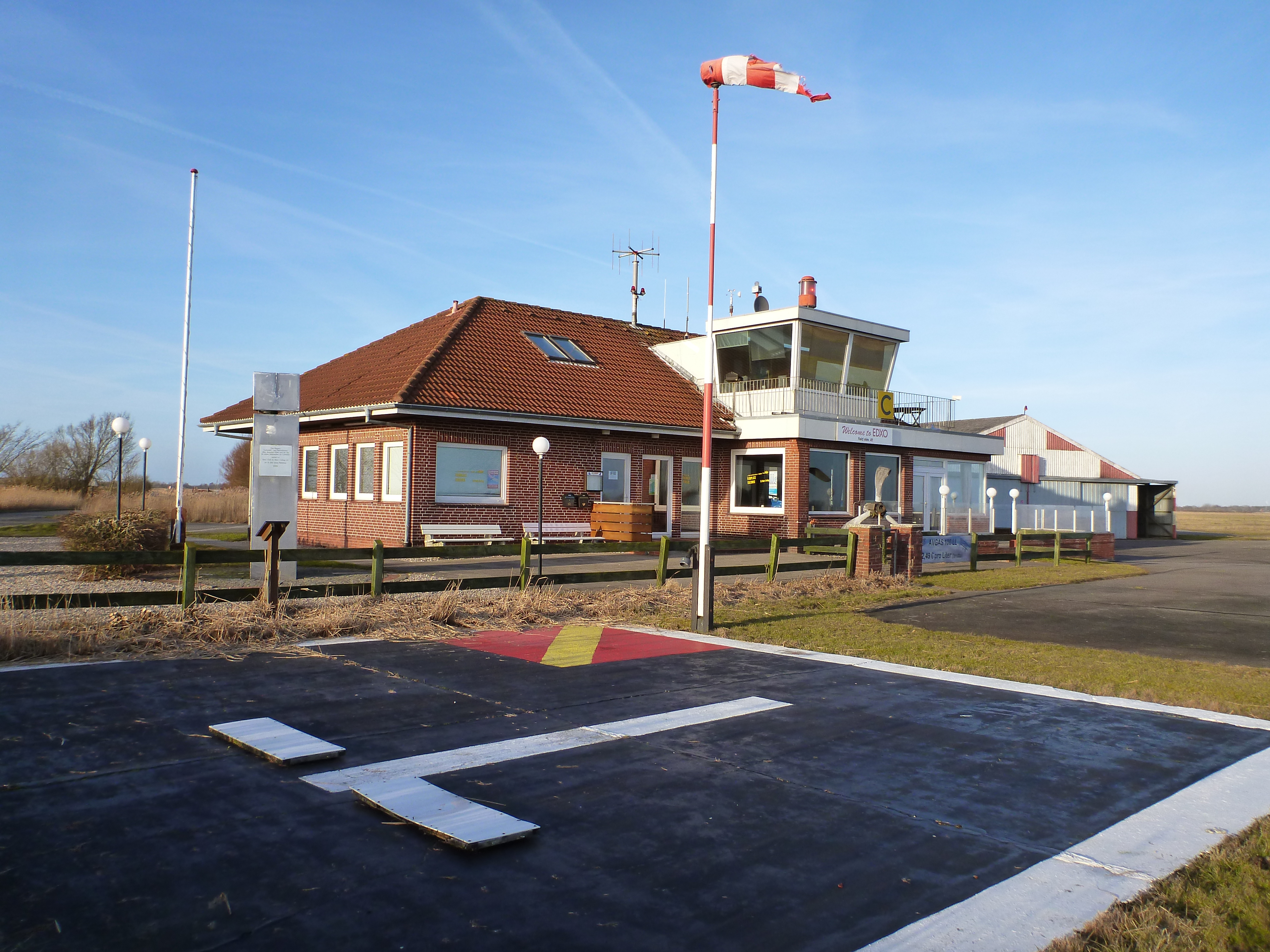
- IATA: PSH; ICAO: EDXO

Summary
- Airport type: Public
- Operator: Flugplatz-Betriebsgesellschaft St. Peter-Ording
- Location: Sankt Peter-Ording, Germany
- Elevation AMSL: 2 m / 7 ft
- Coordinates: 54°18′30″N 008°40′58″E
- Website: flugplatz-st-peter-ording.de

Map
- Location of the airport in Schleswig-Holstein

Runways
Direction	Length		Surface
Direction	m	ft	Surface
07L/25R	670	2,198	Asphalt

Sankt Peter-Ording Airfield (German: Flugplatz St. Peter-Ording) (IATA: PSH, ICAO: EDXO) is an airport in Sankt Peter-Ording, Schleswig-Holstein, Germany.

== Facilities ==
The airfield resides at an elevation of 7 feet (2 m) above mean sea level. It has one runway with an asphalt surface measuring 670 by 30 metres (2,198 ft × 98 ft).

== See also ==
- Transport in Germany
- List of airports in Germany
