= WVN =

WVN may refer to:

- West Virginia Northern Railroad
- Women's Voices Now, short-film festival
- JadeWeserAirport in Wilhelmshaven, Germany (IATA code WVN)
