= Langenlonsheim Airfield =

Langenlonsheim Airfield Flugplatz Langenlonsheim
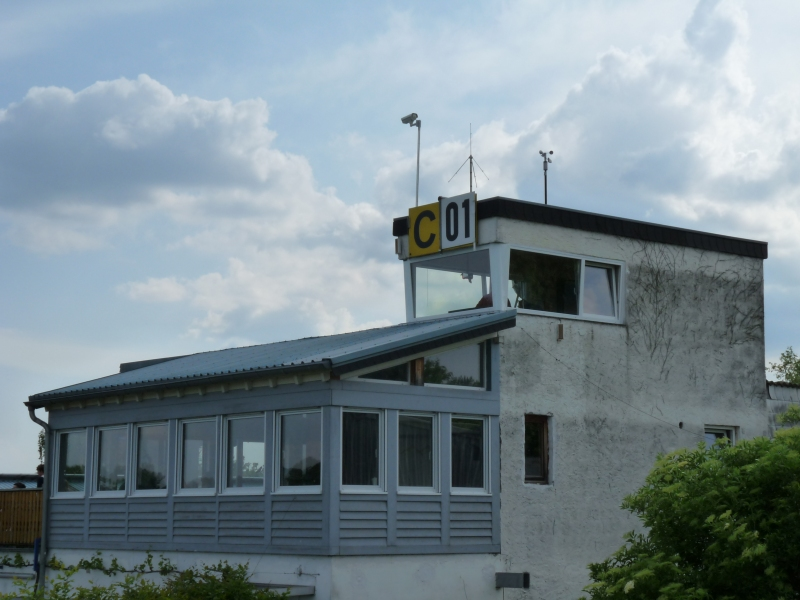
- IATA: none; ICAO: EDEL

Summary
- Airport type: Public
- Location: Langenlonsheim, Germany
- Elevation AMSL: 289 ft (88 m)
- Coordinates: 49°54′29″N 007°54′27″E
- Interactive map of Langenlonsheim Airfield

Runways
Direction	Length		Surface
Direction	m	ft	Surface
01/19	450	1,476	Grass

Langenlonsheim Airfield (or Flugplatz Langenlonsheim in German) is a small airfield in Langenlonsheim, Germany. It has a single grass runway in the direction 01 / 19 with a length of 450 meters (1,476 feet). Prior permission is required for visiting aircraft.

== See also ==
- Transport in Germany
- List of airports in Germany
