= Emden Airport =

Emden Airport Flugplatz Emden
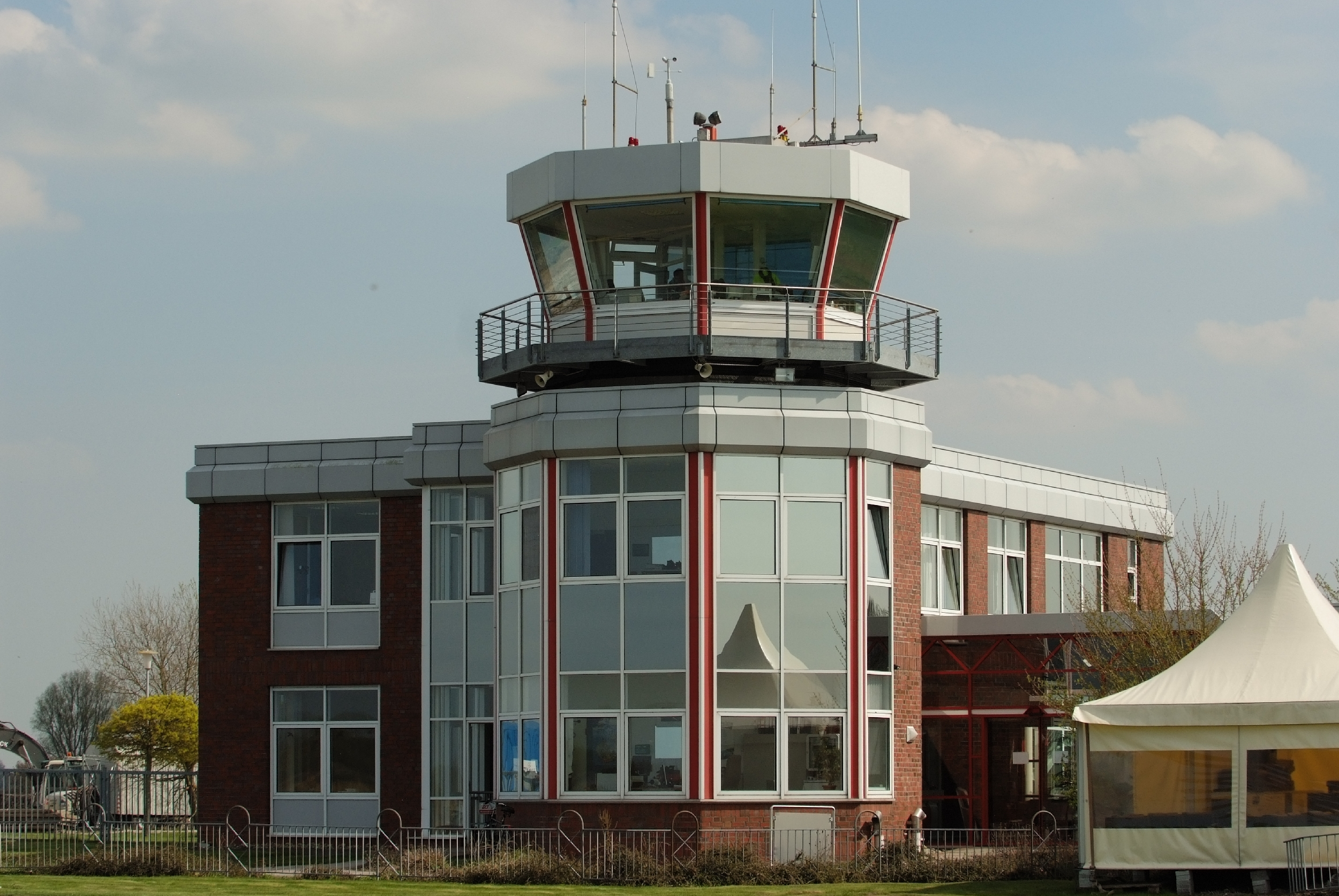
- IATA: EME; ICAO: EDWE

Summary
- Airport type: Public
- Operator: Flugplatz Emden GmbH
- Serves: Emden, Germany
- Elevation AMSL: 2 ft (0.61 m)
- Coordinates: 53°23′28″N 007°13′39″E
- Website: flugplatz-emden.de

Map
- Location of airport in Lower Saxony, Germany

Runways
Direction	Length		Surface
Direction	m	ft	Surface
07/25	1,300	4,265	Asphalt

Statistics (2005)
- Passengers: 21,984
- Cargo (tonnes): 656
- Aircraft movements: 8,391
- Sources: AIRPORTS.DE, DAFIF; AIP at German air traffic control.

Emden Airport (German: Flugplatz Emden) (IATA: EME, ICAO: EDWE) is an airfield serving Emden, a city in the East Frisia region of the German state of Lower Saxony.

== Facilities ==
The airport is at an elevation of 2 feet (1 m) above mean sea level. It has one runway designated 07/25 with an asphalt surface measuring 1,300 by 30 metres (4,265 ft × 98 ft).

== Airlines and destinations ==
The following airlines offer regular scheduled and charter flights at Emden Airport:

Airlines	Destinations
OFD Ostfriesischer Flugdienst	Borkum, Juist (suspended)

== See also ==
- Transport in Germany
- List of airports in Germany
