= Hoppstädten-Weiersbach Airfield =

Hoppstädten-Weiersbach Airfield Flugplatz Hoppstädten-Weiersbach
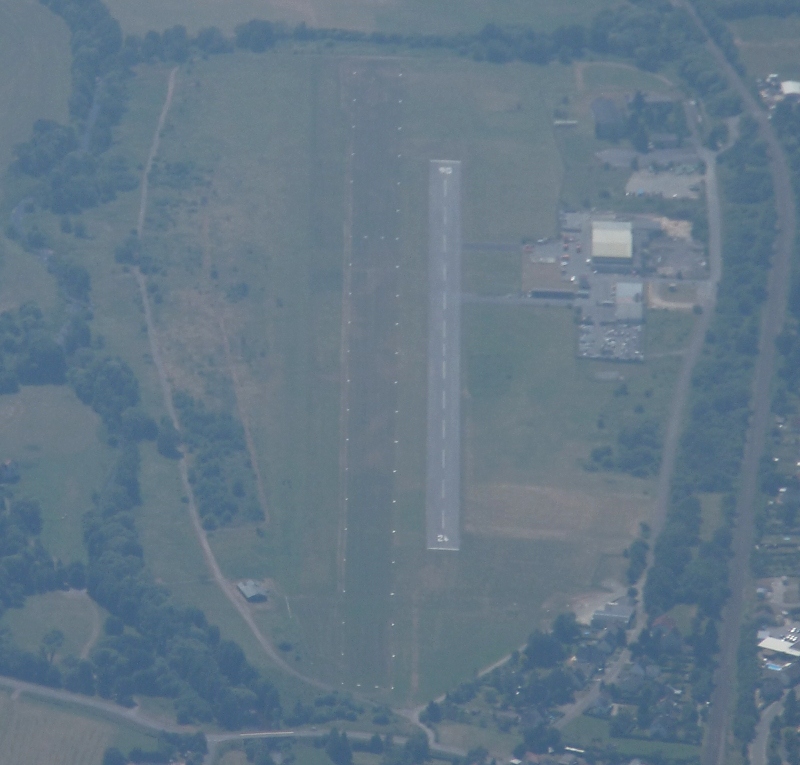
- IATA: none; ICAO: EDRH

Summary
- Airport type: Public
- Operator: Flugsportverein Hoppstädten-Weiersbach e.V.
- Elevation AMSL: 1,093 ft / 333 m
- Coordinates: 49°36′38″N 007°11′07″E
- Website: fsv-howei.de
- Interactive map of Hoppstädten-Weiersbach Airfield

Runways
Direction	Length		Surface
Direction	ft	m	Surface
06/24	2,198	670	Asphalt
06/24	3,281	1,000	Grass

Hoppstädten-Weiersbach Airfield is a general aviation airport in Hoppstädten-Weiersbach, in western Rheinland-Pfalz, Germany, near the Saarland border. It has two parallel runways in the 06/24 direction; one asphalt and one grass. Despite this, no left (L) or right (R) markings are used. During the Cold War, it was known as Boehmer Army Airfield and was used by the US Army which had aircraft based there from 1956 until 1973 and used it as a maintenance facility thereafter. It was nicknamed Happy Valley. When the Cold War came to an end the airport was handed over to the German government. It no longer has a military function today and the airfield is now operated by a flying club.

== See also ==
- Transport in Germany
- List of airports in Germany
