= Fachschule für Luftfahrzeugführer =

School for professional pilots in Germany

Fachschule für Luftfahrzeugführer (FFL)
- Founded: 1963; 63 years ago
- Headquarters: Mülheim an der Ruhr
- Website: www.ffl-flighttraining.de/

Fachschule für Luftfahrzeugführer (FFL) is a private flight school for professional pilots in Germany. The predecessor establishment, from which FFL would emerge, was founded in 1963. FFL is based in Essen/Mülheim Airport.

The establishment has been involved mainly in the training of professional pilots in preparation for their theoretical and practical state exams, absolved at the local authority - namely: Luftfahrt-Bundesamt.

== Training Procedure ==
Theoretical Training includes Flight Mechanics, Meteorology, Flight Communication, Mass and Balance, Electrical Engineering and Aviation Medicine among others.

For practical training, FFL employs widespread aeroplane-models and modern Flight Simulators. Among those aeroplanes are a Piper Archer III with an Avidyne Entegra Digital-Display Cockpit, four Cessna 152, two Cessna 172, one Socata TB 20 and two Diamond DA 42 TDI.

== Training Degrees ==
Students are prepared for the state exams conducted by Luftfahrt-Bundesamt including, but not limited to, the following licenses:

- Private Pilot Licence (PPL)
- Commercial Pilot Licence (CPL)
- Instrument Flight Rules (IFR)
- Airline Transport Pilot Licence (ATPL) as a continuous or a modular model, the latter being of use for pilots who already own one or several other licenses.
- Flight-Instructor-Licence

== Cooperation ==
Starting in the fall of 2013, FFL partook in University of Pune's training of engineers including flight training as part of the degree. The two-year-long theoretical part of training took place at the University of Pune, and the practical training following that took place at the Essen/Mülheim Airport.
