= Aachen Merzbrück Airfield =

Airport in Germany

Aachen Merzbrück Airfield Flugplatz Aachen-Merzbrück
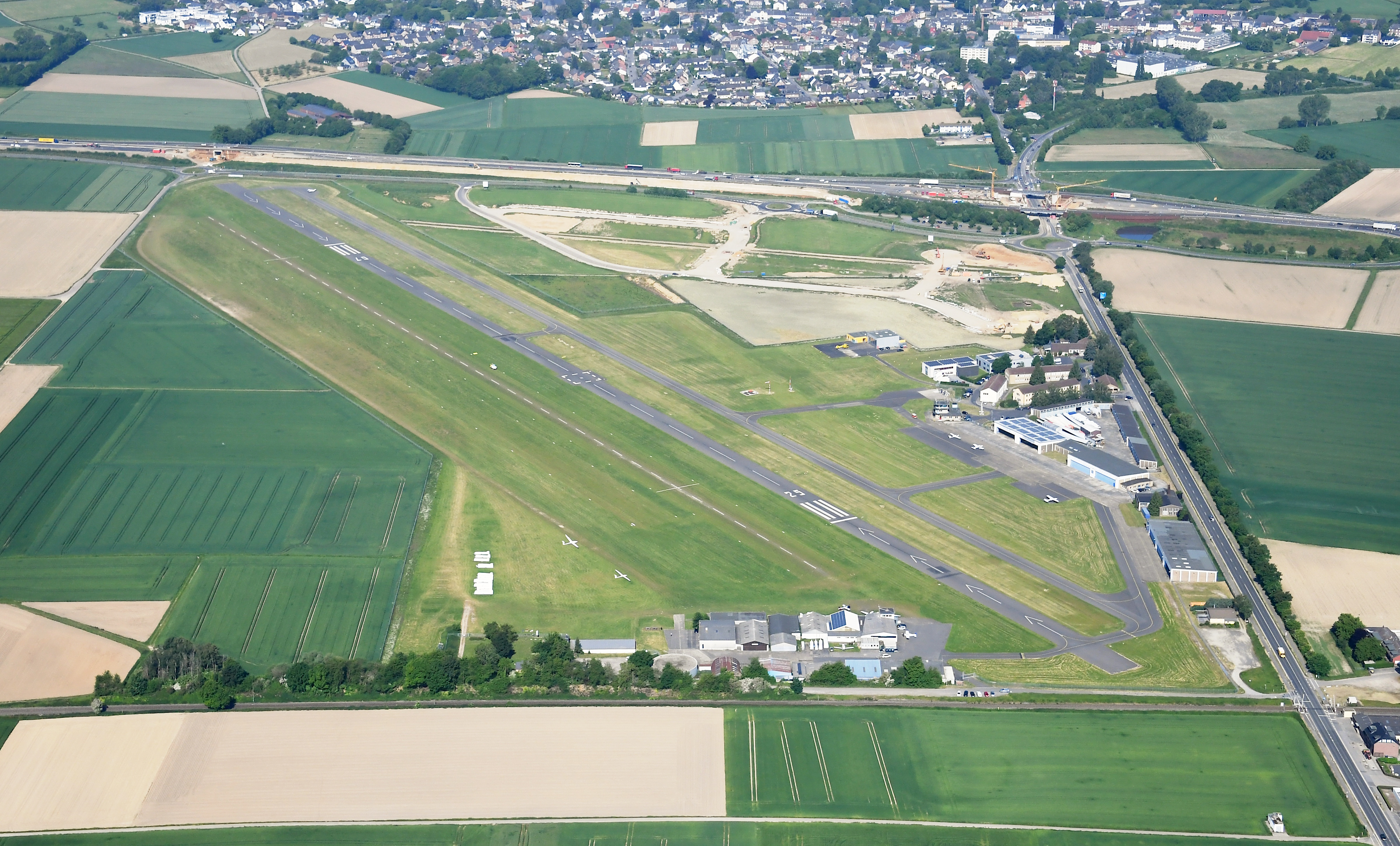
- IATA: AAH; ICAO: EDKA

Summary
- Airport type: Public
- Operator: Flugplatz Aachen-Merzbrück GmbH
- Serves: Aachen, Germany
- Location: Würselen
- Elevation AMSL: 623 ft / 190 m
- Coordinates: 50°49′24″N 006°11′11″E
- Website: flugplatz-aachen.de
- Interactive map of Aachen Merzbrück Airfield

Runways
Direction	Length		Surface
Direction	ft	m	Surface
07/25	3,805	1,160	Asphalt

Aachen Merzbrück Airfield (German: Flugplatz Aachen-Merzbrück) (IATA: AAH, ICAO: EDKA) is an airfield located near Aachen, Germany.

== History ==
The airfield was built about 1914 as a grass airfield, and throughout the 1930s was used by small light aircraft. After the First World War in 1919, it was taken over by Belgium occupying power and used as a military airfield and expanded accordingly. In 1929, the Belgian soldiers withdrew and the airfield became a civilian airfield. In 1930, the airship, Graf Zeppelin landed and took off in Merzbrück as part of a sightseeing flight in the Rhineland. In 1931, a line connection to Cologne Butzweilerhof Airport was set up, which was operated with the Junkers G 24 until 1935. In 1935, the regular scheduled flight to Cologne was discontinued for economic reasons. In 1932, the world's largest airplane at that time, the Junkers G 38, landed in Merzbrück.

In World War II, Merzbrück was used by the Luftwaffe, with IV.(Stuka)/LG 1 and I./St.G. 77 of Lehrgeschwader 1, equipped with Junkers Ju 87s during the first week of the Battle of Belgium in May 1940. After the Battle of France in June ended, the airfield was little used by the military or general aviation.

In January 1945, as a result of the Western Allied invasion of Germany, United States Army forces moved through the Aachen area and captured Merzbrück Airport about 29 January. In February, combat engineers of the 818th Engineering Aviation Battalion arrived and laid down a 5000' Pierced Steel Planking metal runway down on the grass airfield aligned 05/23 for use by combat aircraft, and the airport was designated as Advanced Landing Ground "Y-46 Aachen". The Americans used the airport for P-47 Thunderbolt combat operations until the middle of April 1945, and the airport was closed on 11 May 1945.

After the war, the airfield was used by the British Forces in Germany and later by the Belgian Forces in Germany. Subsequently, the airfield was rebuilt with an all-weather asphalt runway, taxiways, and both concrete and grass aircraft parking areas. A parallel grass runway is also available.

== Usage ==
There is no scheduled traffic at the airfield. It primarily is used by general aviation, and also has a large sailplane facility. The ADAC air rescue service provides the air rescue helicopter Christoph Europa 1 for urgent medical rescues and air ambulance duties here. A flight school and maintenance facility (Westflug Aachen) is located here since 1967.

== See also ==
- Transport in Germany
- List of airports in Germany
