= HGL =

HGL may refer to:

- Heligoland Airfield, on the German island of Düne
- Hengelo railway station, in the Netherlands
- Henry George League, an Australian political party
