= Juist Airfield =

Airfield in Germany

Juist Airfield Flugplatz Juist
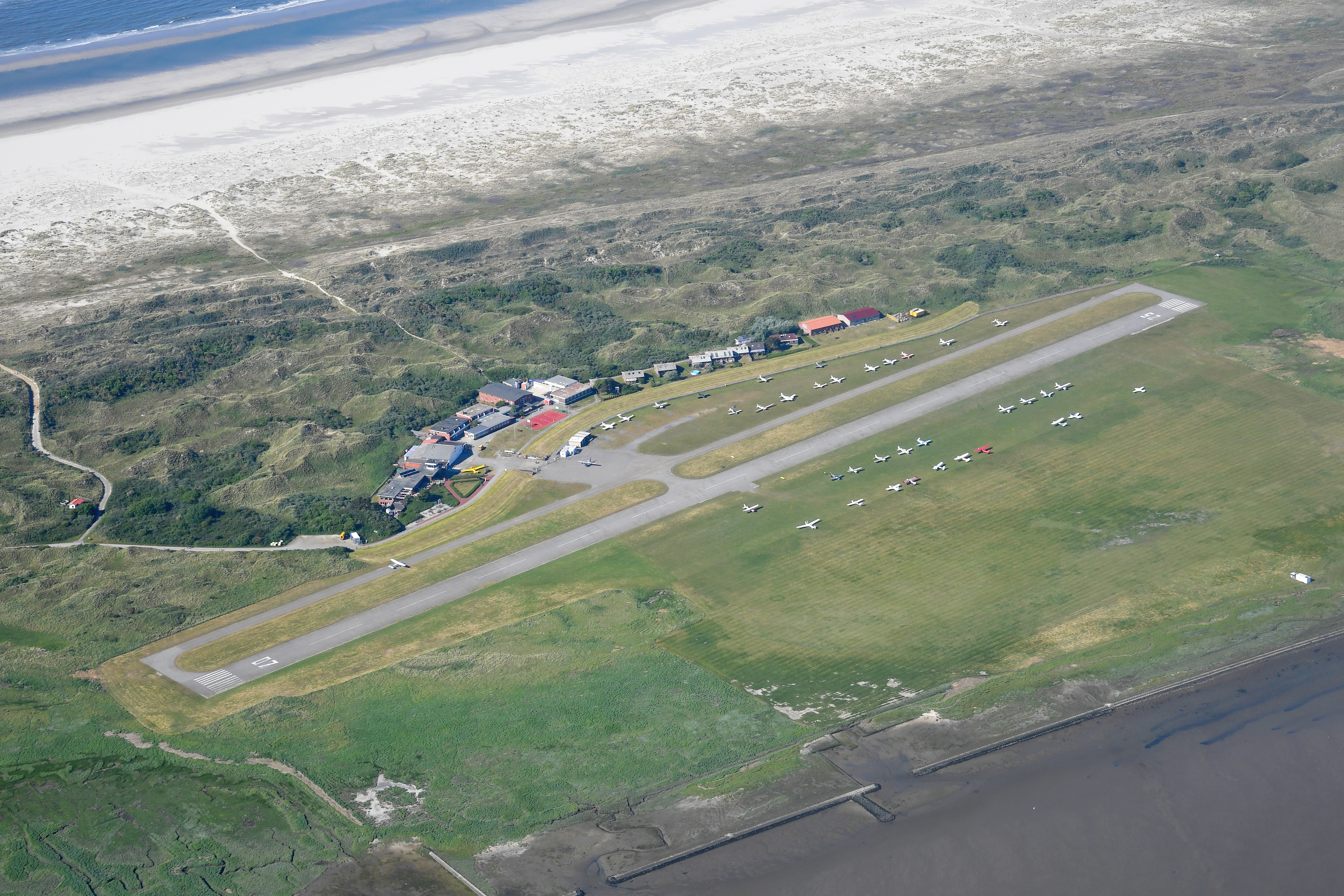
- IATA: JUI; ICAO: EDWJ

Summary
- Airport type: Public
- Operator: Verkehrslandeplatz Juist Betriebs-GmbH
- Location: Juist, Germany
- Opened: 1934
- Elevation AMSL: 8 ft (2.4 m)
- Coordinates: 53°40′52″N 7°03′23″E
- Website: edwj.de

Map
- Location in Lower Saxony

Runways
Direction	Length		Surface
Direction	m	ft	Surface
06/24	500	1,640	Grass
07/25	700	2,297	Clinker bricks
08/26	428	1,404	Grass
12/30	475	1,558	Grass

Statistics (2021)
- Passengers: ▲40,328
- Freight (in kilograms): ▲436,423
- Aircraft movements: ▲19,828
- Source: AIP VFR Germany, Statistischer Bericht Luftverkehr

Juist Airfield (German: Flugplatz Juist, IATA: JUI, ICAO: EDWJ) is an airfield on the island of Juist in Lower Saxony, Germany. The airport serves regular flights to Norden-Norddeich Airfield on the mainland. As of 2013, the airfield had up to 500 takeoffs and landings on weekends, the second most aircraft movements in the state of Lower Saxony, after Hannover Airport. The airfield is a critical piece of infrastructure for the island, due to ferry traffic being dependent on the tides.

== History ==
Construction of the airfield started in 1932, finishing with an opening ceremony in 1934. At the time, most traffic was bringing guests to the island's seaside resort. During World War II, control of the airfield was assumed by the Wehrmacht, and anti-aircraft artillery was used to fortify the airfield, though no fighter planes were stationed there. At the end of the war, the airfield was abandoned.

In July 1952, the airfield was reactivated. In 1973, the airfield became the first on the East Frisian Islands to receive a paved runway.

In 2025, FLN Frisia Luftverkehr announced it would end flights to Norddeich due to decreasing passenger numbers as a result of newly-established express ferry services.

== Airlines and destinations ==
The following airlines offer regular scheduled and charter flights from Juist Airfield:

Airlines	Destinations
OFD Ostfriesischer Flugdienst	Emden (suspended)
Scandinavian Air Charter	Norden-Norddeich
