= Essen/Mülheim Airport =

Aerodrome in Germany

Essen/Mülheim Airport Flughafen Essen/Mülheim
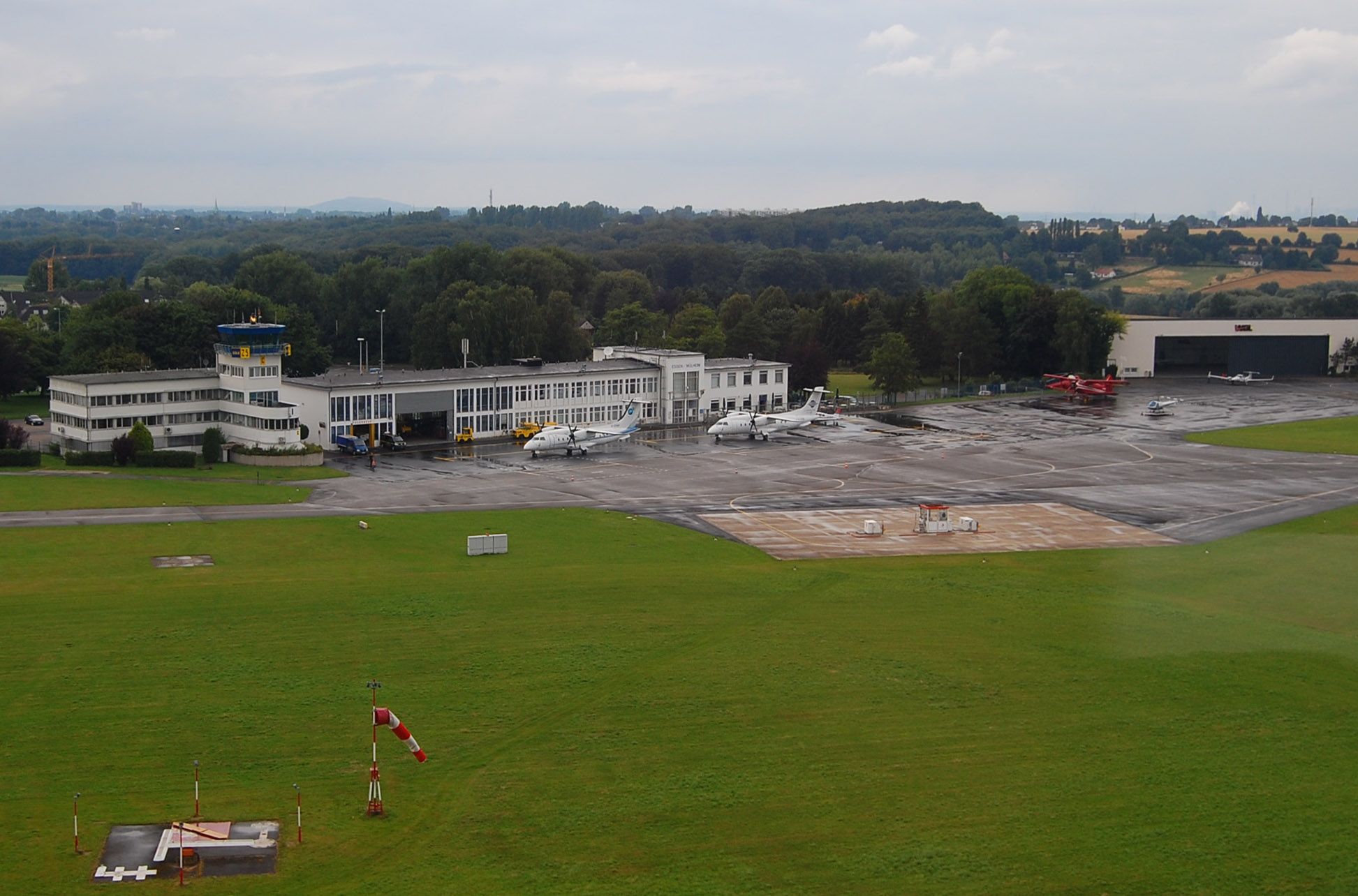
- IATA: ESS; ICAO: EDLE

Summary
- Airport type: Public
- Serves: Mülheim/Essen and the eastern Rhine-Ruhr area, Germany
- Elevation AMSL: 129 m / 423 ft
- Coordinates: 51°24′12″N 006°56′24″E
- Website: flughafen-essen-muelheim.de

Maps
- Location of airport in North Rhine-Westphalia
- Interactive map of Essen/Mülheim Airport

Runways
| Direction | Length | | Surface |
| Direction | m | ft | Surface |
|---|---|---|---|
| 06/24 | 1,553 | 5,095 | Asphalt |
- Source: German AIP at Eurocontrol

Essen/Mülheim Airport (IATA: ESS, ICAO: EDLE), is a minor unscheduled airport located 6 km (3.7 mi) south-west of Essen and 3 km (1.9 mi) south-east of Mülheim, North Rhine-Westphalia. It serves the western Rhine-Ruhr metropolitan region, the largest urban agglomeration in Germany.

== Airlines and destinations ==
There are no scheduled flights to or from the airport, it is mainly used for flight training, general aviation and business charters. The nearest passenger airports are Düsseldorf Airport and Dortmund Airport. Essen/Mülheim is home to blimps used for aerial advertising.

== See also ==
- Transport in Germany
- List of airports in Germany
