= JadeWeser Airport =

JadeWeser Airport JadeWeser Airport
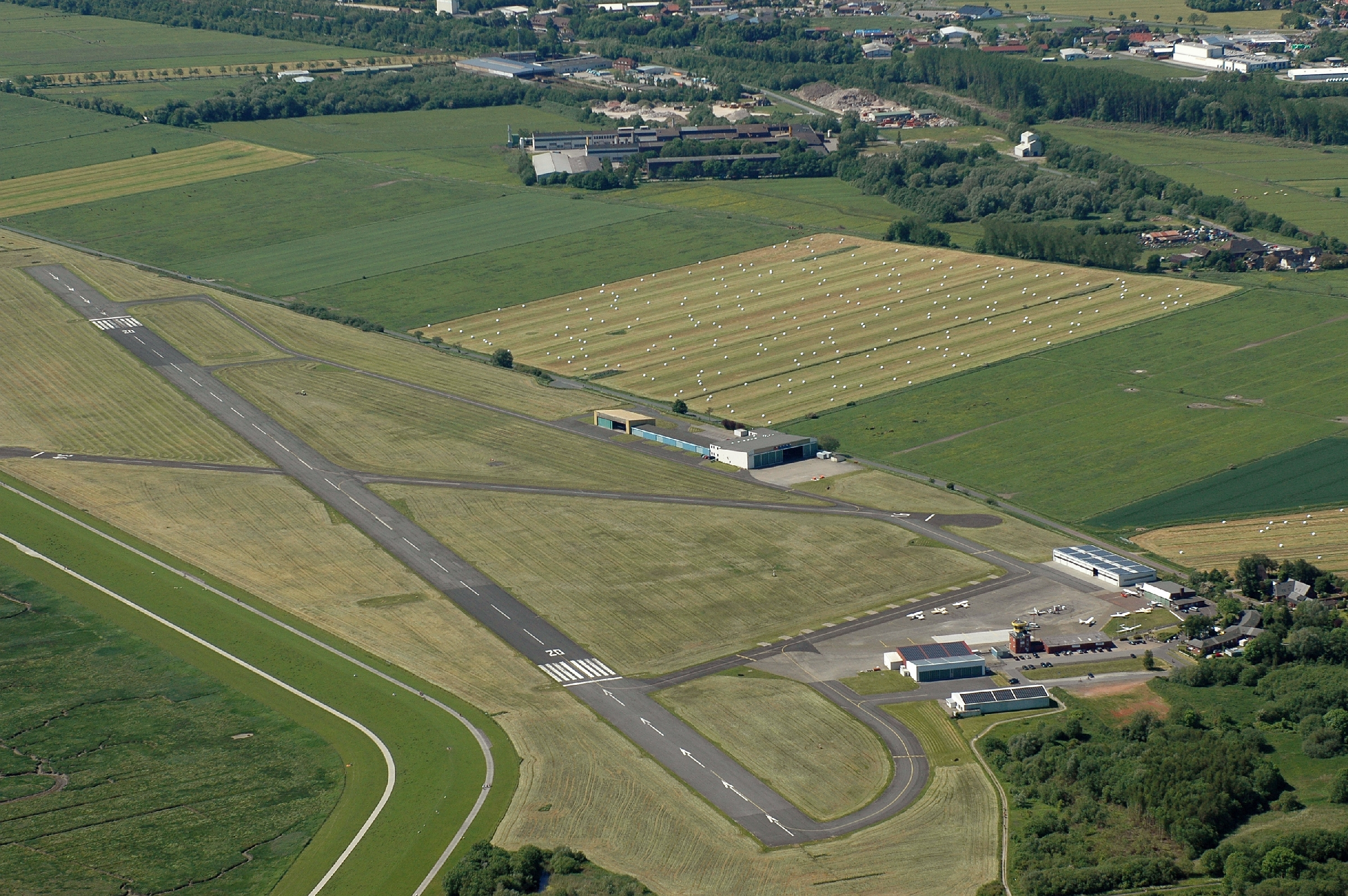
- IATA: WVN; ICAO: EDWI

Summary
- Airport type: Public
- Operator: JadeWeserAIRPORT GmbH
- Location: Wilhelmshaven, Germany
- Elevation AMSL: 19 ft / 6 m
- Coordinates: 53°30′11″N 008°03′10″E
- Website: www.edwi.info

Map
- Location of the airport in Lower Saxony

Runways
Direction	Length		Surface
Direction	m	ft	Surface
02/20	1,459	4,787	Asphalt
16/34	615	2,018	Asphalt
- AIP at German air traffic control.

JadeWeser Airport (German: JadeWeser Airport) (IATA: WVN, ICAO: EDWI) is a minor unscheduled airport near Wilhelmshaven, Lower Saxony, Germany. It is located near JadeWeserPort, a major German deep-sea harbour construction site.

== Airlines and destinations ==
Since August 2018, there are no regular scheduled passenger flights.

== See also ==
- Transport in Germany
- List of airports in Germany
