= Heligoland Airfield =

Airfield serving Heligoland island, Schleswig-Holstein, Germany

Heligoland Airport Flughafen Helgoland-Düne
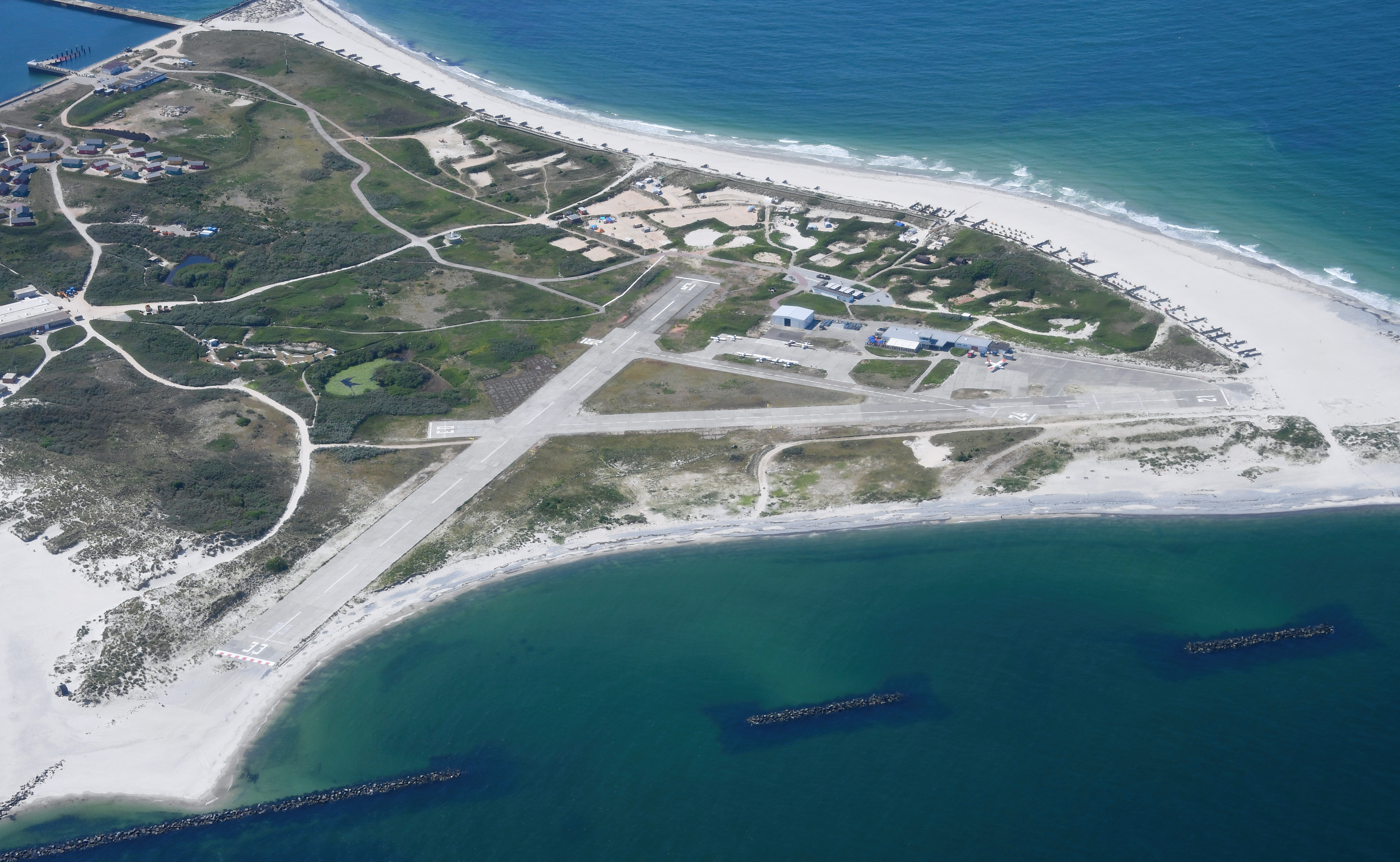
- IATA: HGL; ICAO: EDXH

Summary
- Airport type: Public
- Operator: Helgoland Air Service GmbH
- Serves: Heligoland, Germany
- Location: Düne
- Elevation AMSL: 2 m / 7 ft
- Coordinates: 54°11′09″N 007°54′52″E
- Website: flugplatz-helgoland.de

Map
- Location of the airport in Schleswig-Holstein

Runways
Direction	Length		Surface
Direction	m	ft	Surface
15/33	480	1,575	concrete
03/21	371	1,217	concrete
06/24	258	846	concrete

Helipads
Number	Length		Surface
Number	m	ft	Surface
H	??	??	concrete
- Source: official website

Heligoland Airport (IATA: HGL, ICAO: EDXH) (also known as Helgoland Airfield) is an airfield on the German island of Düne, the smaller of the two isles of the Heligoland archipelago in the North Sea, about 70 kilometres (43 mi) from the mainland.

== History ==
The first military airfield on Düne existed during World War II when Heligoland had been fortified. In 1962, the airport was rebuilt into the form it still has today.

From 2005 to 2006, the main runway (direction 15/33) was extended from 400 m to 480 m for compliance with EU regulations on commercial air traffic.

== Facilities ==
The airport is licensed for aeroplanes up to 5,700 kilograms (12,600 lb) maximum takeoff weight and helicopters up to 10,000 kilograms (22,000 lb). Due to the limited length of the runways and adverse wind conditions, the approach to and departure from the airport is demanding, requiring experience and special preparation from pilots. For commercial flights, prior training is mandatory.

== Airlines and destinations ==
The following airlines offer regular scheduled and charter flights at Heligoland Airport:

Airlines	Destinations
OFD Ostfriesischer Flugdienst	Heide-Büsum, Nordholz-Spieka

== Ground transportation ==
A ferryboat service connects Düne to the Heligoland main island; there is a single taxi that services the short distance between the airport and ferryboat terminals. In general, motor vehicles and bicycles are prohibited on the archipelago.

== See also ==
- Transport in Germany
- List of airports in Germany
- List of shortest runways
