= OFD Ostfriesischer Flugdienst =

Regional airline in Germany

- Founded: 1958 (as part of OLT); 2011 (as OFD)
- Operating bases: Emden Airport
- Fleet size: 7
- Destinations: 5
- Headquarters: Emden, Germany
- Website: fliegofd.de

OFD Ostfriesischer Flugdienst GmbH (German for East Frisian Flight Service), usually shortened to OFD, is a German regional airline headquartered in Emden and based at Emden Airport. It mainly operates charter and scheduled flights between the German North Sea coast and the East Frisian Islands, as well as to the island of Helgoland.

== History ==
The history of OFD reaches back to its predecessor, which was founded in November 1958 as Ostfriesische Lufttaxi - Dekker und Janssen OHG - or OLT for short - to offer ad-hoc charters and sightseeing flights in East Frisia. By 1961, the demand had increased heavily and by 1968, OLT was the largest German regional airline. During the 1970s, as new investors were found, OLT expanded its services with scheduled flights between German cities such as Münster/Osnabrück-Frankfurt.

From the late 1970s to the 1990s, the growing company has been reorganised several times to reflect their different fields of activity and new ownerships. In September 2011, as the scheduled flights section of OLT was sold to Polish investors (and since went bankrupt), all island services were transferred into the independent company OFD which it is since.

In February 2025, OFD announced plans to replace their aging Britten-Norman Islander fleet with newly bought Tecnam P2006T.

== Destinations ==
As of January 2025, OFD serves the following scheduled seasonal and year-round domestic destinations in the German North Sea area:

- Borkum - Borkum Airfield
- Cuxhaven - Nordholz-Spieka Airfield
- Emden - Emden Airport
- Heide - Heide-Büsum Airport
- Helgoland - Heligoland Airfield

== Fleet ==
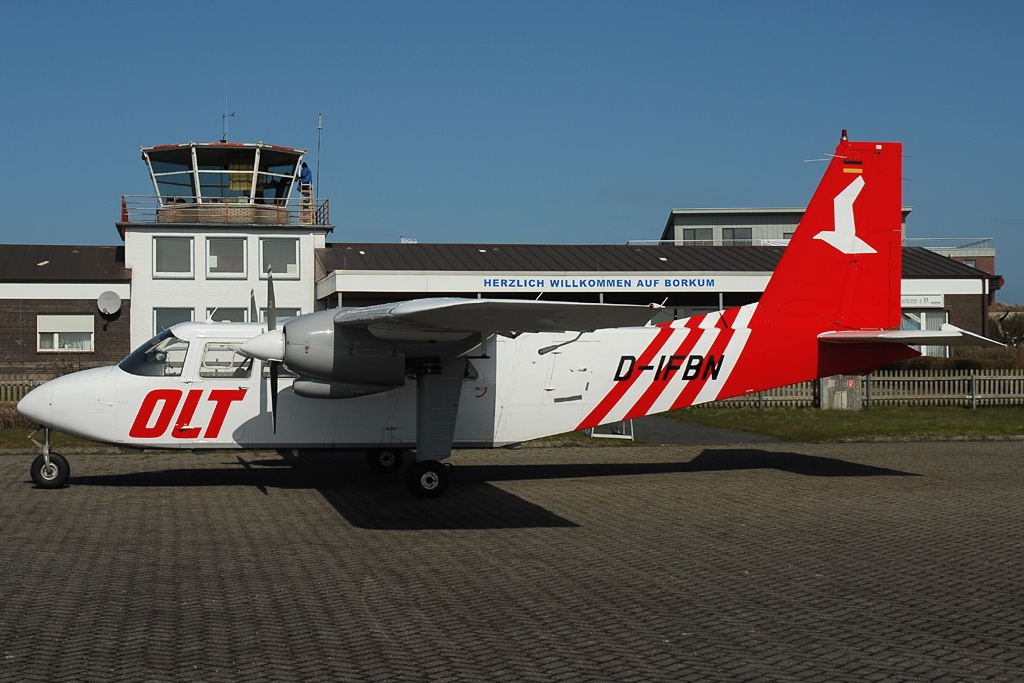
OFD Britten-Norman Islander at Borkum Airfield still wearing OLT titles

As of February 2025, the OFD fleet consists of the following aircraft:

- 3 Britten-Norman Islander (to be retired)
- 1 GippsAero GA8 Airvan
- 3 Tecnam P2006T
