= Düne =

Island in Germany

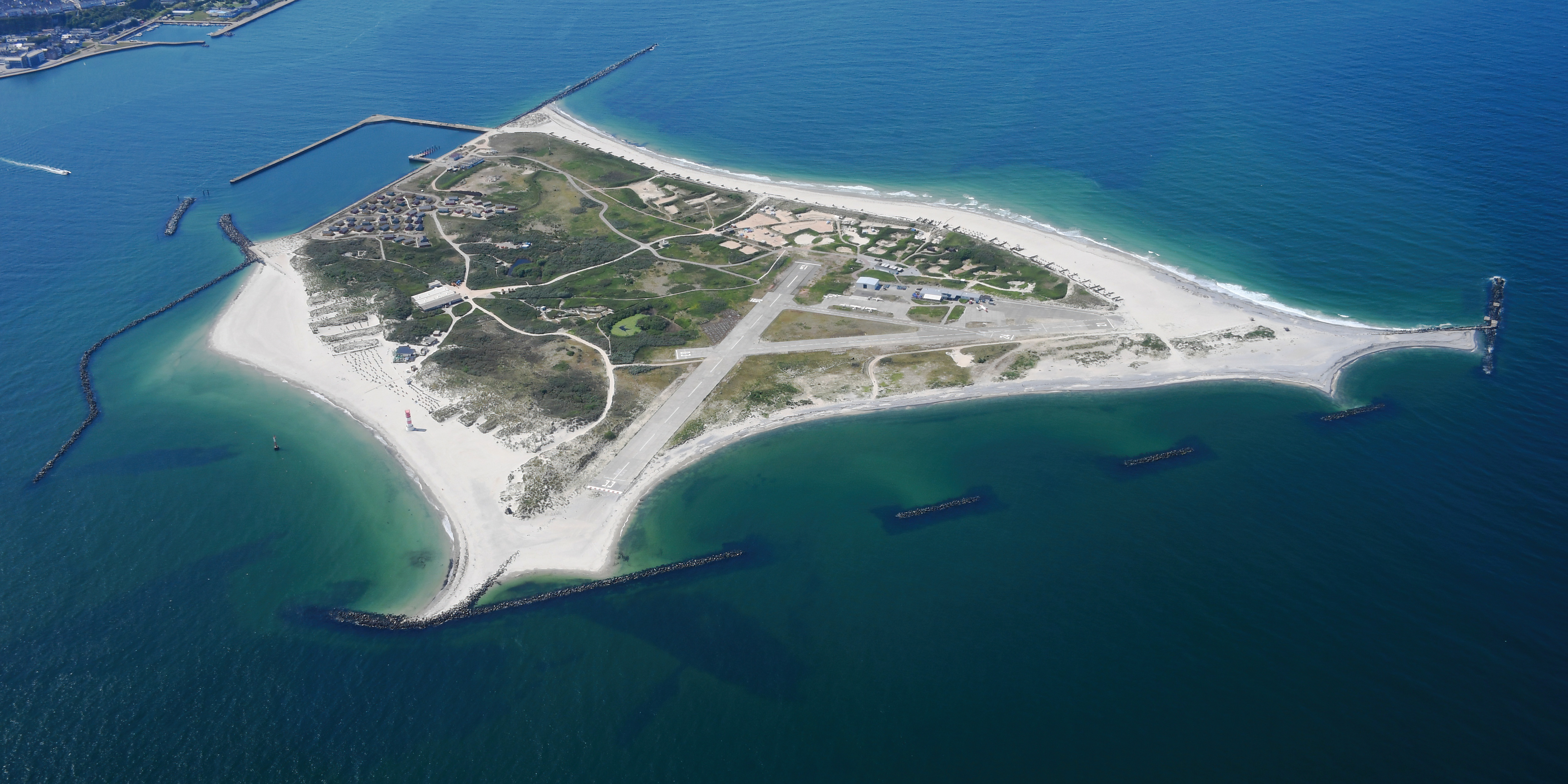
- Aerial view

- Location within Germany

Geography
- Location: German Bight
- Coordinates: 54°11′5″N 7°54′44″E
- Archipelago: Heligoland
- Area: 0.7 km^{2} (0.27 sq mi)

Administration
- Germany
- State: Schleswig-Holstein
- District: Pinneberg district
- Municipality: Heligoland

Demographics
- Population: unpopulated

Additional information
- Official website: helgoland.de

Düne (German pronunciation: [ˈdyːnə]; Danish: Dynen; North Frisian: de Halem) is one of two islands in the German Bight that form the Archipelago of Heligoland, the other being Heligoland proper.

== Geography ==
The small island of Düne is part of the German State of Schleswig-Holstein. Situated 1.6 kilometres (1 mi) to the east of the main island Heligoland, Düne is part of the Heligoland protected natural area. The island measures 1.26 kilometres (0.78 mi) in length and 0.85 kilometres (0.53 mi) in width. The island is separated from Heligoland proper by the Rede strait.

Island of Düne (Heligoland)

== History ==
Until the 18th century, Düne was connected to Heligoland. On New Year's Eve 1721 a big storm surge separated the dunes from Heligoland. Therefore, the island that arose was called Düne (English: Dune). In 1935 the size of the island was 10 hectares (25 acres). In 1940 the Nazi government increased the size of the island to 40 hectares (99 acres). This increase was for use as a military airfield. The Heligoland Airfield is still used today and has three runways, of which the longest is 480 metres (1,570 feet).
