= Norden-Norddeich Airfield =

Airfield in Germany

Norden-Norddeich Airfield Flugplatz Norden-Norddeich
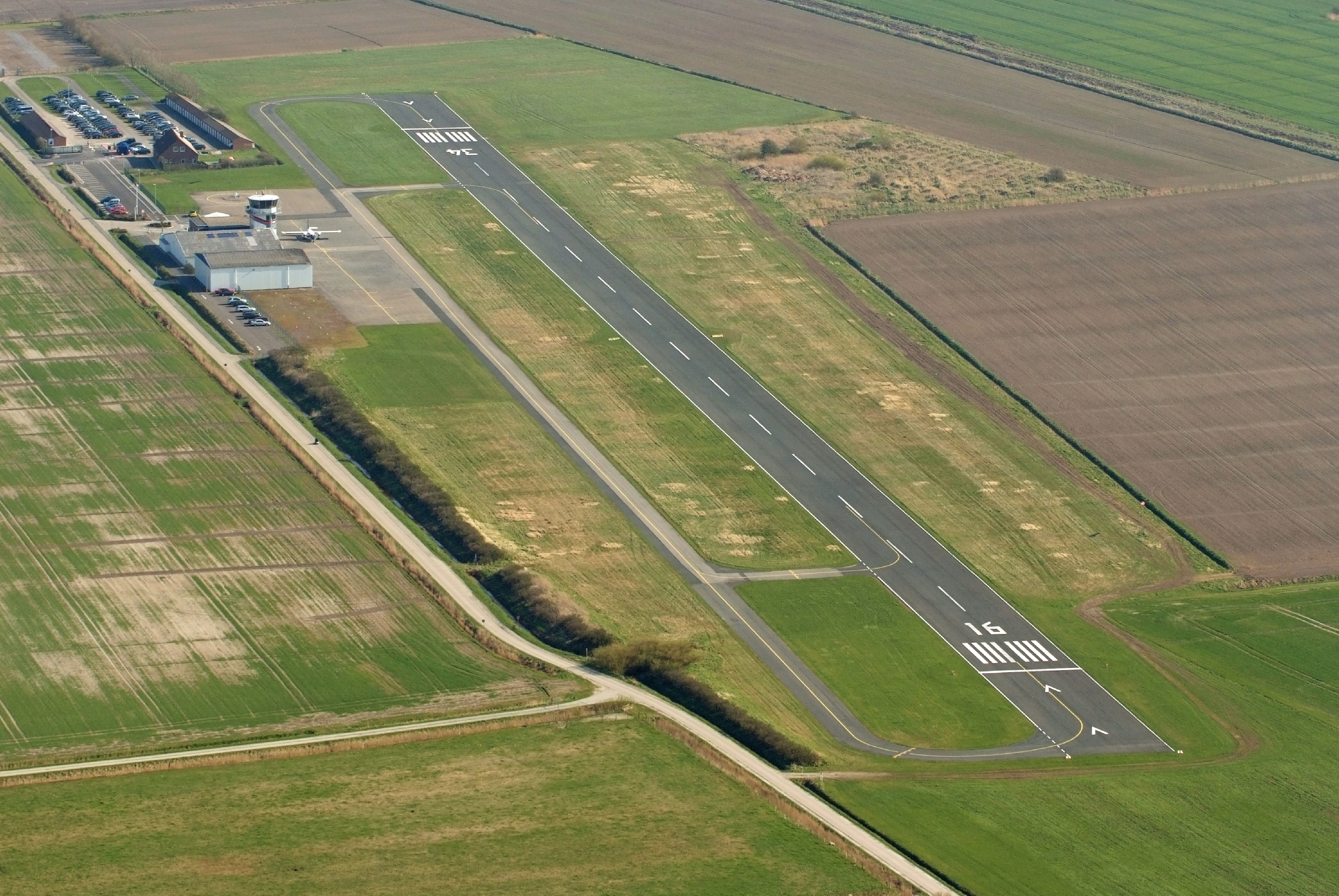
- IATA: NOD; ICAO: EDWS

Summary
- Airport type: Private
- Location: Norddeich, Norden, Germany
- Elevation AMSL: 3 ft / 1 m
- Coordinates: 53°37′59″N 7°11′25″E

Map
- Location in Lower Saxony

Runways
| Direction | Length | | Surface |
| Direction | m | ft | Surface |
|---|---|---|---|
| 16/34 | 720 | 2,362 | Asphalt |
- Source: GCM

Norden-Norddeich Airfield (German: Flugplatz Norden-Norddeich, IATA: NOD, ICAO: EDWS) is an airfield near the northwestern Norden borough of Norddeich in Lower Saxony, Germany. The airport serves regular flights to airports on the islands of Norderney and until March 2025 Juist. It is also home to a flying club, which operates two aircraft from a hangar on the airfield's east side.

== History ==
In 2025, FLN Frisia Luftverkehr announced it would end flights to Juist due to decreasing passenger numbers as a result of newly established express ferries.

== Airlines and destinations ==
The following airlines offer regular scheduled and charter flights from Juist Airfield:

| Airlines | Destinations |
|---|---|
| Scandinavian Air Charter | Juist |
