= 2001 Bremerhaven Airline Britten-Norman Islander crash =

2001 aviation accident in Germany

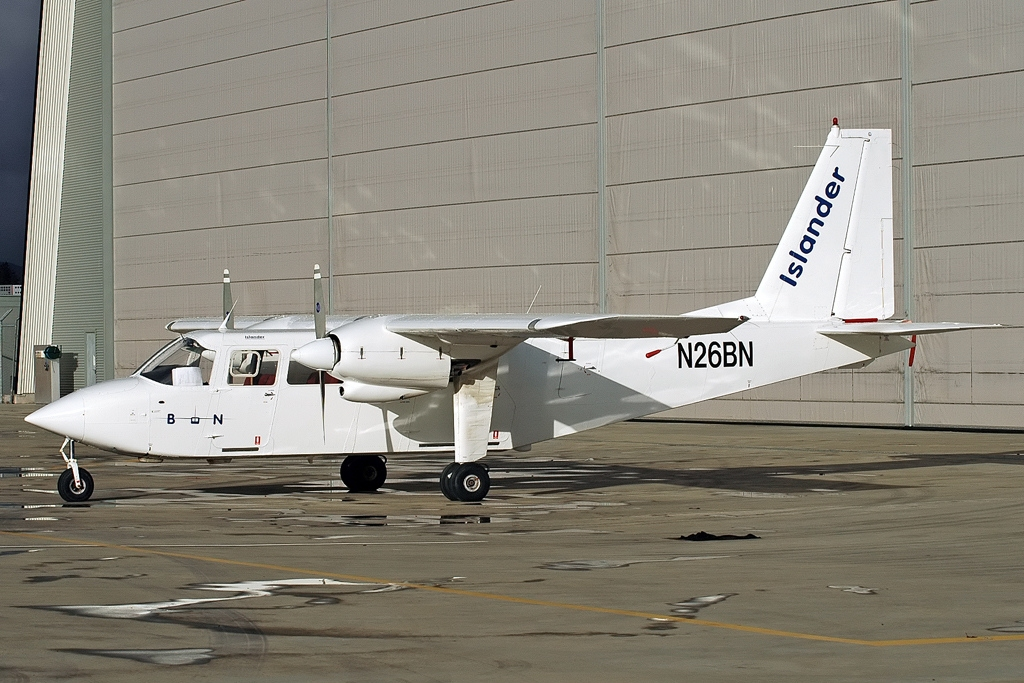
- A Britten-Norman Islander, similar to the aircraft involved

Accident
- Date: 26 December 2001
- Summary: Loss of lifting on take off due to icing
- Site: Off Bremerhaven Airport, Bremen State, Germany; 53°31′2.8″N 8°33′39.8″E

Aircraft
- Aircraft type: Pilatus Britten-Norman BN-2B-26 Islander
- Operator: BAL Bremerhaven Airline
- Registration: D-IAAI
- Flight origin: Bremerhaven Airport, Bremen State, Germany
- Destination: Wangerooge Airfield, Lower Saxony, Germany
- Occupants: 9
- Passengers: 8
- Crew: 1
- Fatalities: 8
- Injuries: 1
- Survivors: 1

On 26 December, 2001, a BAL Bremerhaven Airline Pilatus Britten-Norman BN-2B-26 Islander, operating a domestic regional flight in Germany from Bremerhaven Airport, Bremen State, to Wangerooge Airfield, Lower Saxony, crashed, shortly after take off, in the Weser estuary off the coast of the city of Bremerhaven. Eight of the nine people on board were killed. The investigaation into the accident found out that the airplane stalled, after losing lift on take off, due to ice accumulation.

== Background ==
=== Aircraft ===
The aircraft involved in the accident was a Pilatus Britten-Norman BN-2B-26 Islander registered as D-IAAI and manufactured in 1985. The aircraft was owned and operated by the regional and air taxi airline BAL Bremerhaven Airline.

=== Occupants ===
On board the aircraft there were eight passengers and a single pilot. The 57 years old pilot was also a vice-official at the airline, with the job to oversee flight operations. The eight passengers were tourists from the region of North Rhine-Westphalia and personnel of an hotel on Wangerooge island. A 43 years old woman, who was one of the passengers, was the only survivor of the accident.

== Accident ==
The aircraft was scheduled to depart Bremerhaven Airport, Bremen State, for the Wangerooge Airfield, Lower Saxony, at around 9:30 am local time, but, due to a snowstorm affecting the area, the flight was delayed by around 45 minutes. At 10:13 am the airplane took off from runway 34 and started its climb. The aircraft reached a maximum altitude of around 60 meters, then started banking left and losing altitude. The plane then crashed and rapidly sank into the eastuary of the Weser river, off the city of Bremerhaven.

The passengers and crew of the MV Bremerhaven ferry, that was sailing in the area, witnessed the accident, so the crew of the ship decided to deviate from its route to reach the crash site. The MV Bremerhaven rescued two passengers, and its crew were the first people to alert the authorities. Then the German Federal Coast Guard, the local firefighters and the Wasserschutzpolizei, the german river police, started, with the use of seven ships and two helicopters, search and rescue operations, they managed to rescue a third person. Sonars were used to try to locate the wreckage underwater, and sub expeditions were sent. In the end of the nine people on board three, two passengers and the pilot, were rescued, of them one died shortly after and the other died in hospital in Bremen after some hours, and the other six remained missing, but were presumed dead, due to the low temperatures of the river's waters. Only a 43 years old woman survived. The wreckage of the aircraft was later located at a depth of 11 meters. Recovery operations lasted until December 31, when the last parts of the wreckage, belonging to the tail sections were recovered. Most of the wreckage was found in an area pretty far away from the crash site, and it was probably brought there by the river currents.

== Investigation ==
After the recovery the wreckage of the aircraft was taken to Bremerhaven Airport for inspection. Scrutiny was immediately done on the aircraft's maintenance history. On December 24 the aircraft flew to Sylt island after a mechanical failure, and there some parts were changed and repaired, including the anti-ice system.

The German Federal Bureau of Aircraft Accident Investigation published its final report on the accident in March 2003. The investigaation found out that the aircraft stalled shortly after take off due to a loss of lift caused by icing. Prior to take off de-icing procedures were not properly performed, in this way letting ice to expand during the flight. The fact that Bremerhaven Airline didn't have official de-icing procedures contributed to this lack of de-icing.

== Aftermath ==
Following the accident BAL Bremerhaven Airline filed for bankruptcy and ceased operations shortly after. This led to a decrease in passenger traffic at Bremerhaven Airport, with 5000 less travellers than 2001 reported in 2002. The decrease was caused by the fact that the routes between Bremerhaven and the Frisian Islands, the ones that BAL operated, were among the most trafficked at the airport. In May of 2003 a new airline, naamed Luft-Transport Friesland Harle, took over the former BAL routes.

=== Legal procedure ===
A legal procedure was started against the owner of BAL Bremerhaven Airline and the airline itself following the crash. The man was accused of involountary manslaughter for not complying with aviation safety norms in not giving the pilots of the airline clear and official anti-ice procedures. The procedure was initially archived, but then reopened after renewed complains by the families of the victims.
