= Razzmatazz =

Razzmatazz or Razzamatazz may refer to:

== Film and television ==
- Razzmatazz (American TV series), a 1977–1982 news and entertainment program for teens and young adults
- Razzmatazz (British TV series), a 1981–1987 children's music show
- Razzmatazz (Indian TV series), a 2001 dance competition show
- Razzmatazz Entertainment, a 1996–1998 video-production subsidiary of UST Inc.
- "Razzmatazz" (The Night Agent), a 2026 television episode

== Music ==
- Razzmatazz (album), by I Dont Know How But They Found Me, or the title song, 2020
- Razmataz, an album, book, and DVD by Paolo Conte, or the title song, 2000
- "Razzmatazz" (song), by Pulp, 1993
- "Razzamatazz", a song by John Travolta, 1977
- "Razzamatazz", a song by Quincy Jones from The Dude, 1981
- "Razzmatazz Intro.", a song by Toy Dolls, a theme tune for the British programme Razzmatazz, included on their album A Far Out Disc, 1985

== Other uses ==
- Razzmatazz (club), a nightclub and concert hall in Barcelona, Spain
- Razzmatazz (color), a Crayola crayon color, a shade of crimson-rose
- MV Razzmatazz, originally MV Bremerhaven, a German-built cruise ship
- Razzmatazz, a 2022 novel by Christopher Moore
- Razzmatazz, a liqueur made by DeKuyper
- Razmatazz, nickname of darts player Madars Razma

== See also ==
- Erasmatazz, the website of game designer Chris Crawford
