= Paolo Conte =

Italian music artist and lawyer (born 1937)

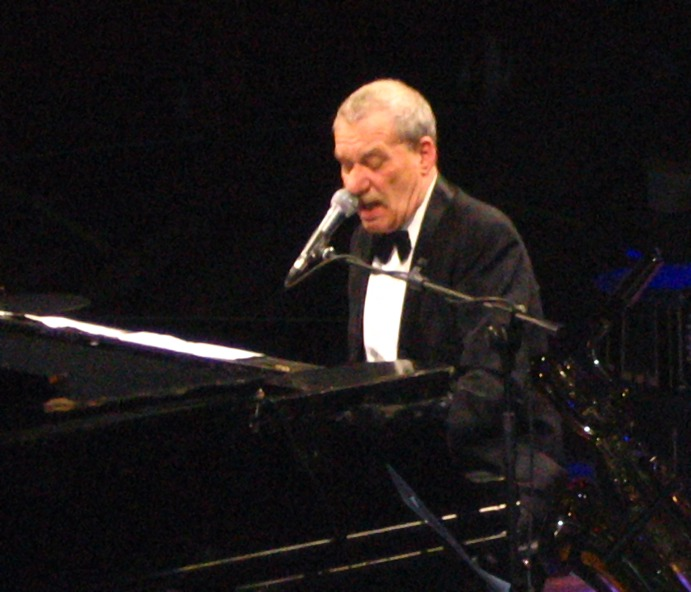
- Conte in Berlin in 2005

Background information
- Born: 6 January 1937 (age 89); Asti, Piedmont, Italy
- Genres: Jazz; chanson
- Instruments: Vocals; piano; kazoo

Paolo Conte (Italian pronunciation: [ˈpaːolo ˈkonte]; born 6 January 1937) is an Italian singer, pianist, songwriter and lawyer, known for his distinctly grainy, resonant voice. His compositions fuse Italian and Mediterranean sounds with jazz, boogie and elements of the French chanson and Latin-American rhythms.

== Career ==
Conte was born in Asti, Piedmont. His parents were avid jazz fans, and Conte and his brother Giorgio spent their formative years listening to a lot of early jazz and blues recordings. After obtaining a law degree at the University of Parma, Conte started working as an assistant solicitor with his father, simultaneously pursuing his musical studies. He learned to play the trombone, the vibraphone and the piano, and after being part of several local bands formed a jazz ensamble with his brother on drums, the Paul Conte Quartet, with whom he made his record debut with the EP The Italian Way To Swing. In 1964, Paolo and Giorgio Conte were put under contract by Clan Celentano, and Paolo Conte made his official debut as composer with Vanna Brosio's "Ed ora te ne vai". In the following years, often paired with lyricist Vito Pallavicini, Conte penned hit songs for Adriano Celentano ("Siamo la coppia più bella del mondo", 1967, and "Azzurro", 1968), Caterina Caselli ("Insieme a te non ci sto più", 1968), Fausto Leali ("Deborah", 1968) and Enzo Jannacci ("Messico e nuvole", 1970).

In 1974, at his producer Lilli Greco's insistence, Conte recorded his first album, Paolo Conte, containing his classic "Onda su onda". The following year, he released another eponymous album, which included the classics "Genova per noi", "La topolino amaranto", and "La ricostruzione del Mocambo". In 1976, Conte held his first solo concerts at Club Tenco in Sanremo and at Teatro Laboratorio in Verona. In 1979, he released his third album, Un gelato al limon, produced by Claudio Fabi and featuring two of his better known songs, "Bartali" and "Sudamerica". Together with its 1981 followup Paris Milonga, which included his signature song "Via con me", the album marked the breakout of Conte. In 1983, he moved from RCA Italiana to CGD and released a third eponymous album, which got him two Targa Tenco prizes for best album and best song ("Sotto le stelle del jazz"), and marked a more explicit embrace of jazz music. Following the release of the album, he held long European and North American tours, gaining particular success in France, where he performed at Olympia for six consecutive days of sold-out concerts. In 1985, he released his first live album, Concerti, recorded between Théâtre de la Ville in Paris, Teatro Morlacchi in Perugia and Teatro alle Vigne in Lodi. In 1987, he released the double album Aguaplano, which again won the Targa Tenco for best album.

In 1990, Conte released Parole d'amore scritte a macchina, in which for the first time he served as arranger. His following studio album, 900, released in 1992, was again awarded the Targa Tenco for best album. His 1996 collection The Best of Paolo Conte (released in the United States in 1998) was an international success. In 1997, Conte won the Nastro d'Argento for Best Score and the David di Donatello in the same category for Enzo D'Alò's film How the Toys Saved Christmas. In 1999, he won the Targa Tenco for best song for "Roba di Amilcare", one of the four new songs included in the live album Tournée 2.

In 2000, after working on it for about 30 years, Conte launched the musical comedy Razmataz, that originally featured 105 songs, and eventually in its stage renditions consisted of 28 songs; it premiered in London at Barbican Centre, and had its French premiere in Cannes in May 2001, with Annie Girardot serving as narrator. In 2004, he won the Targa Tenco for best song for Elegia, the title track of his new studio album. In 2008, for the first time in his career, Conte topped the Italian hit parade with the album Psiche, which was also awarded a Gold Disc.

Some of Conte's most popular songs have been used as film soundtracks, including "Come Di" in I Am David (2003) and Mickey Blue Eyes (1999), "Blue tangos" in Jean-Luc Godard's Nouvelle Vague (1990), "Via con me" in over 40 films including French Kiss (1995), Mostly Martha (2001) and Welcome to Collinwood (2002). In addition, Conte's song "L'orchestrina" is featured in the television series The New Pope (2020).

== Awards ==
On 24 March 1999, Conte was awarded the Knight Grand Cross of the Order of Merit of the Italian Republic, by President Giorgio Napolitano for his "outstanding cultural achievements". On 15 May 2001, France ordered Paolo Conte Chevalier dans l'Ordre des Arts et des Lettres. In 2015, Conte was awarded the Premio Galileo for contemporary music in Padua.

Conte has also received several honorary doctorates, including one from the University of Macerata (1990).

== Discography ==
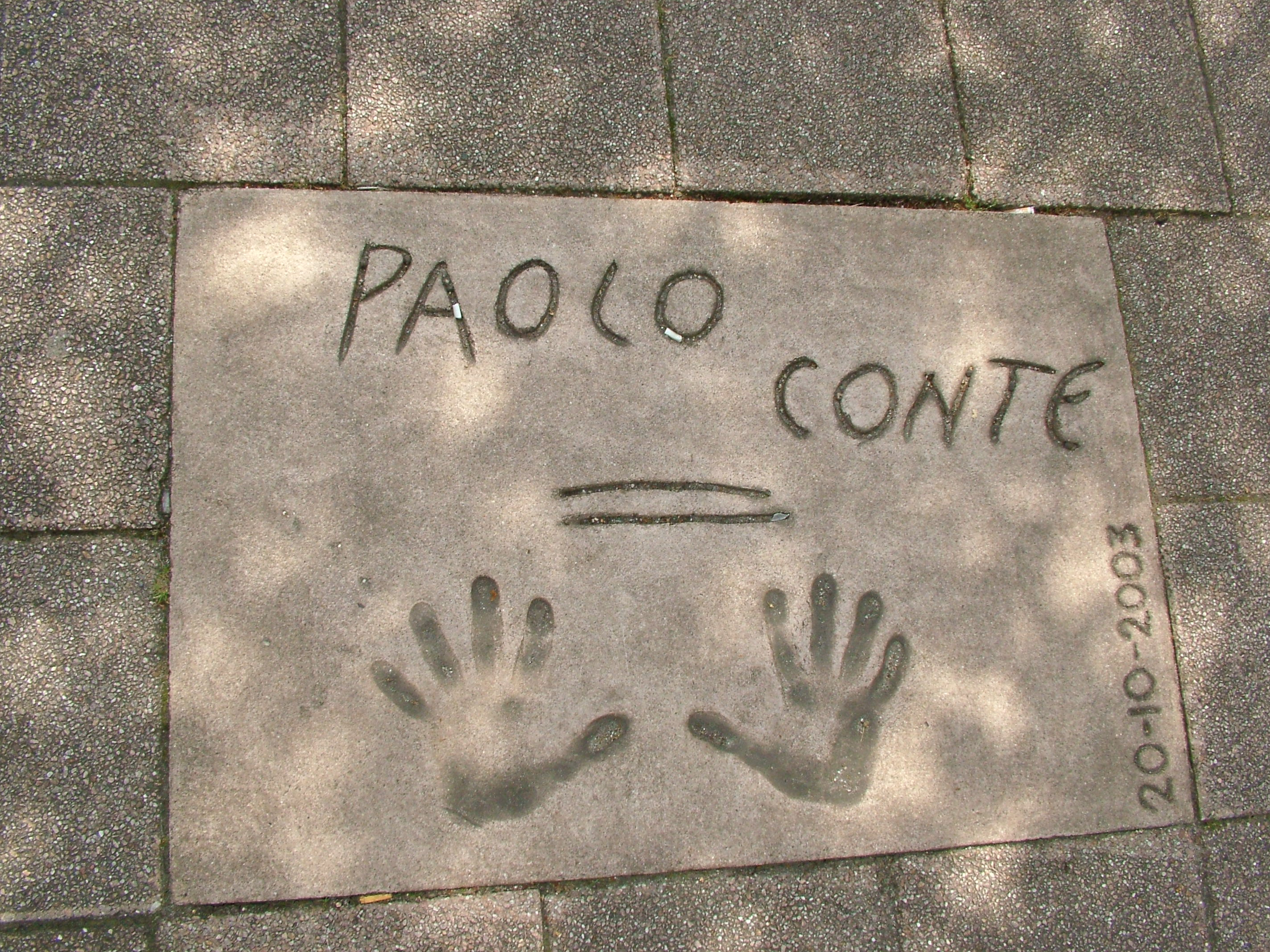
Handprints at Rotterdam's Walk of Fame

=== Studio albums ===
- Paolo Conte (1974)
- Paolo Conte (1975)
- Un gelato al limon (1979)
- Paris milonga (1981)
- Appunti di viaggio (1982)
- Paolo Conte (1984)
- Aguaplano (1987, double album - the Japanese and German releases were issued as two separate albums, the second titled Jimmy Ballando in 1989)
- Parole d'amore scritte a macchina (1990)
- 900 (1992)
- Una faccia in prestito (1995)
- Razmataz (2000)
- Elegia (2004)
- Psiche (2008)
- Nelson (2010)
- Snob (2014)
- Amazing Game (2016)

=== Live albums ===
- Concerti (1985)
- Paolo Conte Live (1988)
- Paolo Conte - Haris Alexiou (1990)
- Tournée (1993)
- Tournée 2 (1998)
- Paolo Conte Live Arena di Verona (2005)
- Live in Caracalla – 50 Years of Azzurro (2018)
- Paolo Conte Live at Veneria Reale (2021)
- Paolo Conte Alla Scala - Il Maestro È Nell'Anima (2023)

=== Greatest hits albums ===
- Come Di (1986, French release)
- Collezione (1988)
- Boogie (1990)
- Wanda, stai seria con la faccia ma però (1992)
- The Best of Paolo Conte (1996)
- Reveries (2003)
- Wonderful (2006)
- Gong-oh (2011)
- The Platinum Collection (2014)
