= Sea-Airport Cuxhaven/Nordholz =

Joint public and military airport serving Cuxhaven and Northern Germany

Sea-Airport Cuxhaven/Nordholz Flughafen Cuxhaven/Nordholz

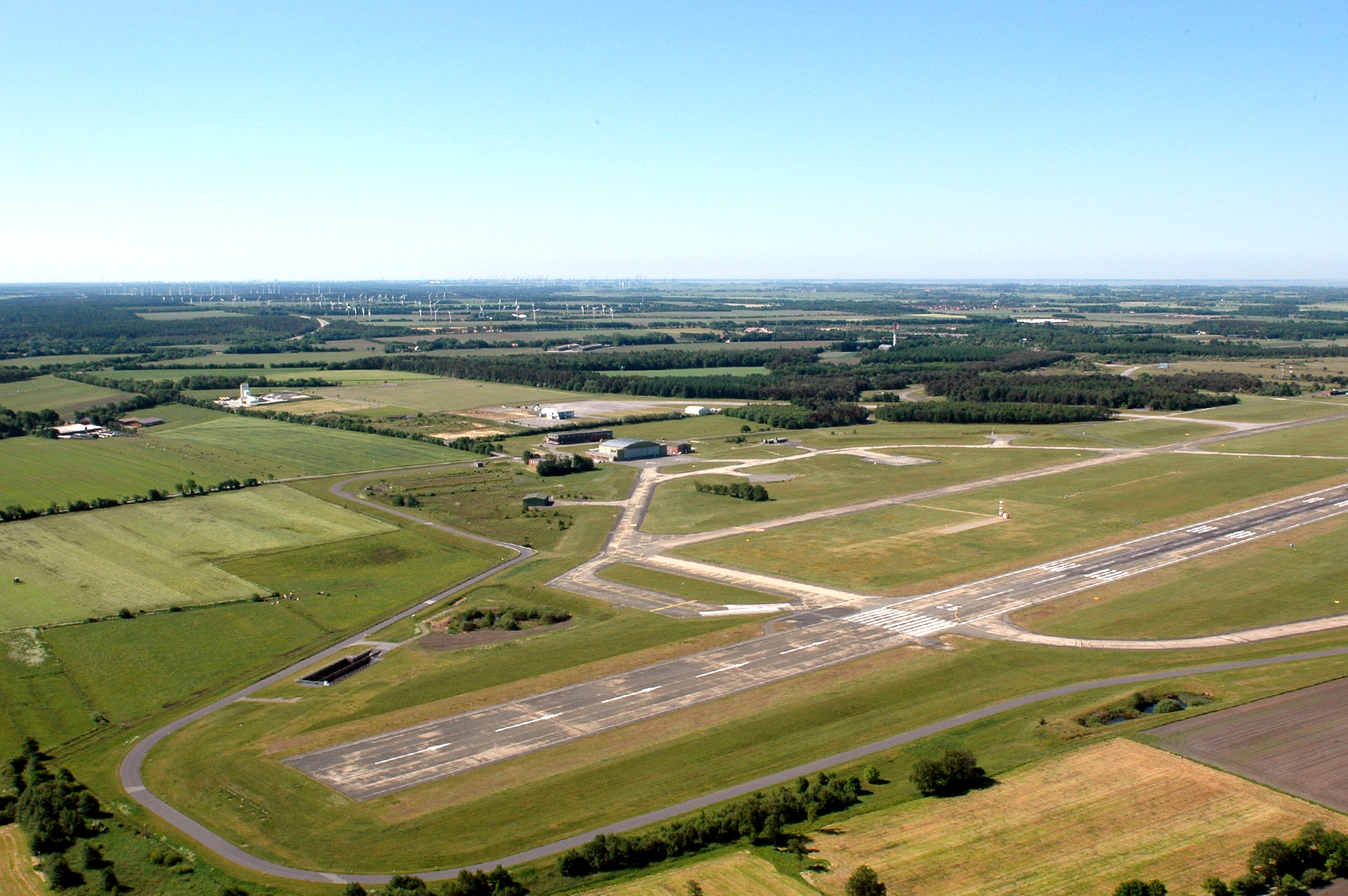
- IATA: FCN; ICAO: ETMN

Summary
- Airport type: Public / Military
- Operator: Flughafen-Betriebsgesellschaft Cuxhaven/Nordholz mbH
- Serves: Cuxhaven, Nordholz and Bremerhaven
- Location: Nordholz, Germany
- Elevation AMSL: 74 ft (23 m)
- Coordinates: 53°46′06″N 008°39′51″E
- Website: sea-airport.de

Map
- Location of Sea-Airport Cuxhaven/Nordholz

Runways
Direction	Length		Surface
Direction	m	ft	Surface
08/26	2,439	8,002	Concrete
- Source Sea-Airport

Sea-Airport Cuxhaven/Nordholz (IATA: FCN, ICAO: ETMN) is a public airport serving Cuxhaven and Northern Germany, sharing its runway with Nordholz Naval Airbase. It is mainly used for general aviation and cargo traffic as the international seaports of Cuxhaven and Bremerhaven are only a few minutes away.

== History ==
Nordholz is one of the oldest airports in Germany, dating to 17 December 1912. Construction of the airport installations started a year later and was finished in 1914. Until 2016, it was exclusively in military use.

In order to replace Bremerhaven-Luneort Airport effective February 2016, a new airpark was established with an area of 40 hectares (99 acres) for industrial or commercial investments, offering direct airfield-access. The Sea-Airpark Cuxhaven/Nordholz is open for investment projects dealing with logistics, industrial production, service facilities or aircraft maintenance.

In November 2016, German leisure airline Germania announced seasonal flights to Palma de Mallorca beginning in September 2017. The first international commercial flight from Cuxhaven, ST6094 by Germania, took place on 29 September 2017. However, after only one operated service, the route has been forbidden indefinitely by the authorities due to unfulfilled safety regulations by the airport.

== Facilities ==
The airport operates a runway with 2,439m x 45m and two 275m overruns. At this time, there seems to be a small general aviation terminal on the southeast side, also to be used for scheduled and charter flights. On the other (northwest) side of the airport, there is Flugplatz Nordholz-Spieka (ICAO: EDXN) used for private aviation featuring a 875x30m grass runway.

== Airlines and destinations ==
As of May 2021, there are currently no scheduled or charter flights at the airport.

== Ground transportation ==
The airport can be reached via nearby A27 motorway (Nordholz exit) which leads from Bremen to Cuxhaven. Currently there is no public transportation available, the only way to reach the airport is by car or taxi. The next train station is Nordholz (4 km) on the train link Bremerhaven-Cuxhaven.

== See also ==
- Nordholz Naval Airbase
- Transport in Germany
- List of airports in Germany
