= Azzurro =

Song by Adriano Celentano

Single by Adriano Celentano

from the album Una carezza in un pugno – Azzurro
- Language: Italian
- A-side: "Una carezza in un pugno"
- Published: May 1968
- Released: May 1968
- Recorded: 1968
- Genre: Pop
- Composers: Paolo Conte; Michele Virano
- Lyricists: Paolo Conte; Vito Pallavicini

"Azzurro" (Italian: [adˈdzurro]; transl. "[Light] Blue") is an Italian pop song composed by Paolo Conte, Vito Pallavicini and Michele Virano. Its most famous version was recorded by Adriano Celentano in 1968.

== Background ==
Conte and Pallavicini wrote "Azzurro" especially for Celentano. The song describes a lonely summer in the city. Structurally it typically reflects Conte's writing style, combining simple and catchy melodies with unusual elements, like the military march music bit in the middle. Conte would record the song himself in 1985, ten years into his own solo career as a performer. Together with "Via con me" and "Sotto le stelle del Jazz", it is now one of his most popular songs.

=== Lyrics ===
The first line of the chorus goes: "Azzurro, il pomeriggio è troppo azzurro e lungo per me..." ("Blue, the afternoon is too long and blue for me..."). Note that, in Italian, azzurro does not bear the negative connotation of "depressing" that blue has in English.

== Charts ==
Chart (1968–69)	Peak position
Austria (Ö3 Austria Top 40)	1
Italy (Musica e dischi)	1
Netherlands (Dutch Top 40)	28
West Germany (Official German Charts)	6

== Certifications ==
Region	Certification	Certified units/sales
Italy (FIMI) since 2009	Platinum	100,000^{‡}
^{‡} Sales+streaming figures based on certification alone.

== Cover versions ==
The song was covered by numerous Italian singers, like Mina, Gianni Morandi and Fiorello. Even the Italian football national team has sung the song on one occasion. German covers were done by Peter Rubin, Die Toten Hosen, Peter Alexander and Rummelsnuff. French cover by Régine. Spanish cover by Gabinete Caligari. Czech cover by Waldemar Matuška, (lyrics by Zdeněk Borovec). Hungarian cover by László Aradszky (lyrics by Kálmán Vándor). In the 2020 Abu Dhabi Grand Prix, German F1 driver Sebastian Vettel sang a farewell song to his Ferrari team after the final race for them, which was based on the song.

=== Arik Einstein cover ===
In Israel, it is a famous song known for its Hebrew version by Arik Einstein "Amru Lo" (Hebrew: "They told him..."). The lyrics, by prominent Israeli songwriter Eli Mohar, do not feature a translation of the original lyrics; Instead, the Hebrew version humorously tells the life story of a youngster who chooses a precarious career as an artist and becomes a fan of an underdog sports team, despite having always been told to "choose the correct path in life" - a reference to Arik Einstein's own life story.

=== Wolfgang Lohr cover ===
In 2023, German house artist Wolfgang Lohr released a modern electro swing cover of the classic Italian song "Azzurro," originally popularized by Adriano Celentano. This reinterpretation, created in collaboration with Club27 and vocalist Renato Legato, brings a fresh, danceable twist to the iconic tune. Lohr’s rendition infuses "Azzurro" with upbeat electronic swing elements, merging vintage Italian charm with contemporary electronic beats. The cover has garnered attention for its innovative approach, blending the nostalgic essence of the original with Lohr's characteristic house style, and has been well received in the electro swing and European dance music communities.

=== Die Toten Hosen cover ===
"Azzurro"

Single by Die Toten Hosen

from the album 125 Jahre die Toten Hosen: Auf dem Kreuzzug ins Glück
- Released: June 5, 1990
- Genre: Punk rock
- Length: 2:32
- Label: Virgin Records
- Songwriters: Paolo Conte; Vito Pallavicini; Michele Virano

Die Toten Hosen singles chronology
"Alles wird gut" (1990)	"Azzurro" (1990)	"All die ganzen Jahre" (1990)

"Azzurro" (on many releases mistitled "Azzuro") was covered by Die Toten Hosen for the album Auf dem Kreuzzug ins Glück as a tribute to 1990 FIFA World Cup.

The single was released with differently coloured covers: green, orange, pink and yellow.

==== Music video ====
The video was directed by Hanns Christian Müller.

The band drives around Italy in an Opel, having to push-start it every time. In the end it gets stolen right before them.

==== Track listing ====
1. "Azzurro" (Conte, Virano/Conte, Pallavicini) − 2:32
2. "Herzlichen Glückwunsch" (Sincere congratulation) (v. Holst/Frege) – 2:03
3. "Dr. Sommer" (Dr. Summer) (Breitkopf/Frege) – 1:57
4. "Feinde" (Enemies) (Frege/Frege) – 2:20

==== Charts ====
Year	Country	Position
1990	Germany	23
1990	Switzerland	17
