= French Kiss (1995 film) =

- Theatrical release poster
- Directed by: Lawrence Kasdan
- Written by: Adam Brooks
- Produced by: Tim Bevan; Eric Fellner; Kathryn F. Galan; Meg Ryan
- Starring: Meg Ryan; Kevin Kline; Timothy Hutton; Jean Reno; François Cluzet; Susan Anbeh
- Cinematography: Owen Roizman
- Edited by: Joe Hutshing
- Music by: James Newton Howard
- Production companies: Working Title Films; Prufrock Pictures
- Distributed by: 20th Century Fox (United States and Canada); PolyGram Filmed Entertainment (international)
- Release date: May 5, 1995 (United States)
- Running time: 111 minutes
- Countries: United States; United Kingdom
- Languages: English; French
- Budget: $40 million
- Box office: $102 million

French Kiss is a 1995 romantic comedy film directed by Lawrence Kasdan and starring Meg Ryan and Kevin Kline. Written by Adam Brooks, it follows a woman who travels to France to confront her unfaithful fiancé but becomes entangled with a charming criminal seated beside her on a flight, who uses her to smuggle a stolen diamond necklace. The cast also includes Timothy Hutton, Jean Reno, François Cluzet, Susan Anbeh, and Marie-Christine Adam.

French Kiss was filmed on location in Paris, the Provence-Alpes-Côte d'Azur région of southeastern France, and Cannes. The film was released by 20th Century Fox in the United States and by PolyGram Filmed Entertainment in other territories on May 5, 1995, and received mixed critical reviews, with praise directed toward the performances of Ryan and Kline and the film's romantic-comedy charm, while critics were divided over its emotional depth and narrative effectiveness.

The film was a commercial success, grossing approximately $102 million worldwide, driven largely by its international performance, against a $40 million production budget. For their performance, Ryan and Kline both received nominations for the 1996 American Comedy Awards. The film later inspired remakes, including the 1998 Hindi film Pyaar To Hona Hi Tha and the 2004 Malayalam film Vettam, and was the final film shot by cinematographer Owen Roizman before his death in 2023.

== Plot ==
American history teacher Kate lives in Canada with her fiancé Charlie, a doctor. When Charlie urges her to accompany him to Paris for an upcoming conference, she declines, partly due to her fear of flying, lactose intolerance and her pending application to become a Canadian citizen.

Days later, Charlie calls Kate, saying he has fallen in love with a French woman, Juliette, and will not be returning. Determined to win him back, Kate boards a flight to Paris and is seated next to smarmy Frenchman Luc Teyssier, whom she instantly dislikes. Luc, who comes from a family of vintners, is smuggling a stolen diamond necklace and an American grape vine. He plans to sell the necklace and use the vine to create his own vineyard. Knowing Kate is unlikely to be searched at customs, he hides them in her bag.

At the airport in Paris, Luc is spotted by Inspector Jean-Paul Cardon, who offers him a ride home and searches his bag for signs of criminality. Cardon is aware of Luc's profession but encourages him to stop and is unwilling to arrest him because Luc once saved his life.

Kate waits for Charlie in the lobby of his hotel, but faints when she sees him kissing the beautiful, glamorous Juliette. A French thief, Bob, steals her luggage while she's out. Luc arrives to retrieve the vine and necklace, and helps Kate identify the thief, whom Luc knows. At Bob's apartment, he admits to having sold her passport and given away her clothes, but the vine is still there.

Kate attempts to get help from both the American and Canadian embassies, but she is denied help as she sought Canadian citizenship without disclosing a prior felony conviction for possession of marijuana. She books a train to Cannes to pursue Charlie, who is traveling with Juliette to meet her parents. Luc, having discovered the necklace is not with the vine and must be in Kate's bag, arrives and pretends to be interested in helping her win Charlie back.

That night, Kate kisses Luc in her sleep. He is disturbed to realize his attraction to her. In the morning, Kate describes a "delicious dream," while sampling copious amounts of French cheese, but they soon make her ill. The pair get off the train at La Ravelle in Paulhaguet, which Luc reluctantly admits is his hometown. He takes Kate to his family's vineyard. She learns about his family and that he gambled away his rights to the family vineyard in a poker game, but is knowledgeable about wine and has a clear passion for it. As they board the train for Cannes, Kate playfully reveals she found the necklace.

Luc advises Kate to mimic the romantic attitudes of French women, who act indifferent toward men and play hard to get. Kate approaches Charlie and Juliette on the beach. She admits to having come to France to win Charlie back, but now claims Luc is her lover and she's realized that the life she was building with Charlie was boring and no longer interests her. That afternoon, Cardon approaches Kate, telling her the necklace is stolen and asking her to hand it over to him so that Luc will not be arrested. She convinces Luc to let her sell the necklace to Cartier.

Kate has dinner with Charlie to discuss the details of dividing their shared property in Canada. He is intrigued by her newfound indifference to him, while Luc distracts Juliette. Kate and Charlie go back to her room, but Kate rejects his advances, realizing she no longer loves him. Luc goes to bed with Juliette, but stops when he calls her "Kate."

The next morning, Kate tells Luc she has won Charlie back. She returns the necklace to Cardon and then gives Luc a check, supposedly from Cartier, which is actually a check for her life savings. She then leaves with Luc's gratitude and heads for the airport. Cardon approaches Luc, who witnesses Charlie and Juliette reconciling, and reveals what Kate has done for him. Luc finds Kate on the airplane and confesses his love for her. They are last seen kissing passionately on the vineyard they now own together.

== Cast ==
- Meg Ryan as Kate
- Kevin Kline as Luc Teyssier
- Timothy Hutton as Charlie Lytton
- Jean Reno as Inspector Jean-Paul Cardon
- François Cluzet as Bob
- Susan Anbeh as Juliette
- Marie-Christine Adam as Juliette's mother
- Jean-Paul Jaupart as Juliette's father
- Renee Humphrey as Lilly
- Michael Riley as M. Campbell
- Laurent Spielvogel as Concierge
- Victor Garrivier as Octave
- Élisabeth Commelin as Claire
- Julie Leibowitch as Olivia
- Miquel Brown as Sgt. Patton
- Claudio Todeschini as Antoine Teyssier
- Jerry Harte as Herb
- Thomasine Heiner as mom
- Barbara Schulz as a pouting girl
- Clément Sibony as a pouting boy
- Adam Brooks as Perfect Passenger
- Patrice Juiff as French Customs Official
- Jean Corso as Hotel George V Desk's clerk
- François-Xavier Tilmant as hotel waiter
- Williams Diols as beach waiter
- Mike Johns as Lucien
- Ghislaine Juillot as Jean-Paul Cardon's wife
- Alain Frérot as Old Man

== Production ==
=== Pre-production ===
The lead role of Luc was originally written for Gérard Depardieu, but Kevin Kline accepted the role when Depardieu was not available for the film.

=== Filming ===
Principal photography took place from September 17 to December 22, 1994. French Kiss was filmed primarily in Paris, the Alpes-Maritimes department in the Provence-Alpes-Côte d'Azur region of southeastern France, and Cannes.

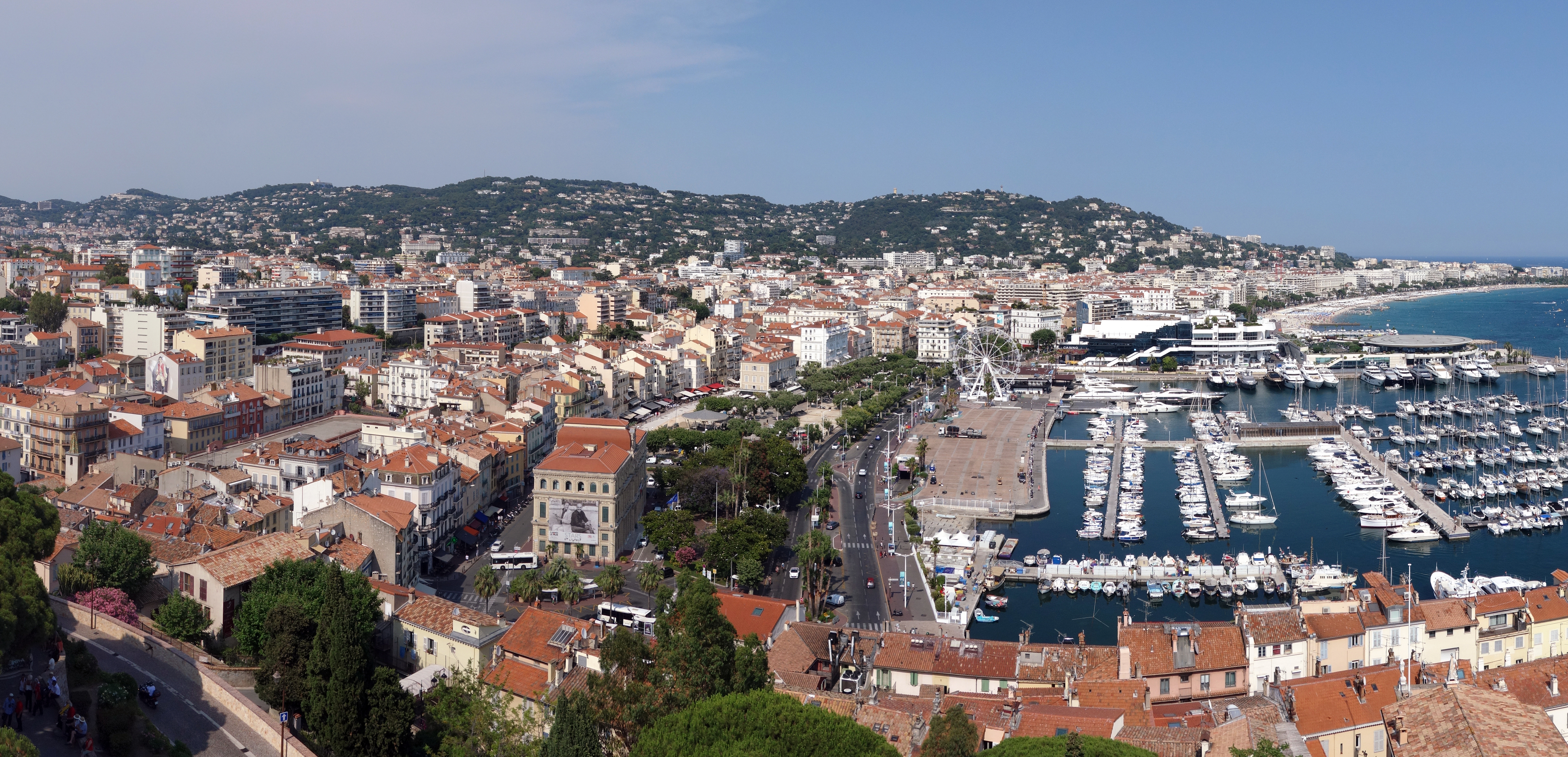
Paris (top) and Cannes (bottom) were among the primary shooting locations for French Kiss.

In Paris, scenes were shot at the Hotel George V, where Kate has her encounters with the supercilious concierge. The hotel lobby was used for the scene where the petty thief Bob steals Kate's bag after she faints. Several scenes show the Eiffel Tower in the background—the one site Kate longs to see most but keeps on missing. A phonebooth on Champs-Élysées near the Arc de Triomphe was used for the scene where Kate calls Charlie's mother. Scenes were also filmed at the American Embassy at 2 Avenue Gabriel, and the Canadian Embassy at 35 Avenue Montaigne. The scene where Luc throws money on the sidewalk was filmed at the corner of rue Paul-Albert and rue Feutrier in Montmartre.

Driving scenes in Paris were filmed in front of the Louvre near the Louvre Pyramid, along the Rive Droite, and on Rue des Rosiers, where Luc drives down a narrow, winding cobblestoned street. Additional Paris scenes were filmed at the Sacré-Cœur in Montmartre, the Grande Pharmacie de la Place Blanche at 5 Place Blanche, the Palais de Chaillot, and Place des Abbesses, where Kate and Luc discuss his "little problem". The final scene filmed in Paris was at the Gare Saint-Lazare train station, where Luc is chased by Inspector Jean-Paul Cardon while trying to board a train south to Cannes. (Note: In fact the train to Cannes leaves from Gare de Lyon station, and not from Gare Saint-Lazare station.)

In the Provence-Alpes-Côte d'Azur region, the small village of Valbonne, about fifteen minutes north of Cannes, was used for several scenes, including the scene where Luc fights with his brother in the main village square in front of the Hotel les Armoiries, an old seventeenth-century building. Other scenes were filmed at the train station and nearby vineyards around La Ravelle, 84240 La Tour-d'Aigues, The train station near Meyrargues, Bouches-du-Rhône, was also used in one scene.

In Cannes, several exterior shots of the Carlton Hotel were used to represent where the four main characters stay. There are interior scenes of the lobby and the brasserie used for morning breakfasts. Other scenes filmed here include the beach in front of the hotel along with the adjacent waterfront—in particular the Cartier boutique on the next corner. The grape harvest scenes were filmed at Château Val Joanis in Pertuis, Vaucluse. Studio scenes were shot at Paris Studios Cinéma.

=== Title ===
The film was originally titled Paris Match, a play on the name of the famous French newsmagazine. However, the title had to be changed after Billy Crystal challenged it with the MPAA as being too close to that of his own Paris-set romantic comedy Forget Paris, released just two weeks later.

=== Soundtrack ===
The French Kiss Original Soundtrack album was released by Mercury Records on CD on May 9, 1995. It peaked at 170 on the Billboard 200.

No.	Title	Performer	Length
1.	"Someone like You" (Van Morrison)	Van Morrison	4:06
2.	"La Vie en rose" (Mack David, Louis Louiguy, Marcel Louiguy, Édith Piaf)	Louis Armstrong	3:22
3.	"Les Yeux ouverts" (Fabian Andre, Wilbur Schwandt, Gus Kahn)	The Beautiful South	3:33
4.	"Via con me" (Paolo Conte)	Paolo Conte	2:36
5.	"I Love Paris" (Cole Porter)	Toots Thielemans	1:38
6.	"Feels like a Woman" (Tena Clark, Zucchero)	Zucchero	5:12
7.	"I Love Paris" (Cole Porter)	Ella Fitzgerald	4:57
8.	"Verlaine" (Charles Trenet, Paul Verlaine)	Charles Trenet	3:10
9.	"C'est trop beau" (Francis López, Raymond Vincy)	Tino Rossi	2:31
10.	"La Mer" (Albert Lasry, Charles Trenet)	Kevin Kline	3:44
11.	"I Want You (Love Theme from French Kiss)" (James Newton Howard)	Instrumental	2:04
12.	"Les Yeux de ton père" (Mathieu Crespin, Stefane Mellino, Jean-Marie Paulus, Noel Rota)	Les Négresses Vertes	3:57
Total length:			40:50

== Release ==
=== Box office ===
The film earned $38,896,854 in the United States and an additional $63,086,000 in international markets for a total worldwide gross of $101,982,854.

=== Critical response ===
French Kiss was released in United States on May 5, 1995, and received mixed reviews. In his review in the San Francisco Chronicle, Mick LaSalle wrote that director Lawrence Kasdan "takes what could have been a fluffy comedy with lots of plot complications and picturesque scenery and instead puts his focus on the important things: on the characters played by Ryan and Kline and how they happen to be feeling." LaSalle also applauded Kasdan's sense of subtle comedy:

With his attention in the right place, Kasdan comes up with ways of using the setting to make emotional points. For example, though the film doesn't go out of its way to make you notice, Ryan keeps missing out on getting to see the Eiffel Tower. It's behind her as she's riding in a car, or she's turning toward it a second after they've turned out the lights. She doesn't know what she's missing—until eventually she does.

LaSalle found Kline's performance "extraordinary" and that he not only perfected the accent but the "speech rhythms and the manner as well." LaSalle also praised Ryan's comic timing, which "continues to delight."

In her review in The Washington Post, Rita Kempley, giving it a mixed review, wrote that the film "isn't as passionate as the title suggests—in fact, it's facile—but Ryan and Kevin Kline, as her attractive opposite, are irresistible together." Kempley applauded the acting performances:

Kline's hilariously hammy l'accent puts Inspector Clouseau's to shame; his performance is the zaniest since A Fish Called Wanda. Ryan's Kate is even pickier than the heroine in When Harry Met Sally... and melts just as endearingly. She and Kline spar convincingly; Doris Day and Rock Hudson had sexier scenes, but none this romantic.

In his review in the Chicago Sun-Times, a disappointed Roger Ebert wrote, "The characters in this movie may look like adults, but they think like teenagers." Although he acknowledged that the film was not without its charms—Paris and Cannes being "two of the most photogenic cities on earth"—Ebert concluded, "Kline's Frenchman is somehow not worldly enough, and Ryan's heroine never convinces us she ever loved her fiancé in the first place."

In her review in The New York Times, Janet Maslin called the film a "romantic comedy with barely a laugh or a spark, and with a pace that makes it feel longer than Mr. Kasdan's previous work, Wyatt Earp."

Review aggregation website Rotten Tomatoes gave the film a score of 46% based on reviews from 28 critics. The consensus summarizes: "French Kiss is effervescent like good champagne but its spirit fizzles in a film that isn't as intoxicating as its stars." On Metacritic, another aggregator, the film holds a weighted average score of 50 out of 100 based on 14 critics, indicating "mixed or average" reviews. Audiences polled by CinemaScore gave the film an average grade of "B+" on an A+ to F scale.

=== Accolades ===
Year	Award	Category	Nominee	Result
1996	American Comedy Awards	Funniest Actor in a Motion Picture	Kevin Kline	Nominated
1996	American Comedy Awards	Funniest Actress in a Motion Picture	Meg Ryan	Nominated

== Home media ==
French Kiss was released in United States on VHS on February 6, 1996 by 20th Century Fox Home Entertainment. It was released in DVD format by 20th Century Fox Home Entertainment on January 18, 2000, and in Blu-ray format by 20th Century Fox Home Entertainment on January 8, 2013.
