= Maxime Foerste =

German actress

Maxime Foerste (born in May 1991) is a German actress. She has been in several movies including Mostly Martha (2001).

== Filmography ==
Foerste has been in films including:

- Der Mörder meiner Mutter (TV, 1999) Anne
- Bella Martha (2001)
- How Do You Change Your Parents? (TV, 2003) Marie
- One Summer (TV, 2005) Julia
- Ein Fall für zwei (TV episode "Der Tod und das Mädchen", 2006)
- Glück auf vier Rädern (TV, 2006) Alessa Köster
- Max Minsky and Me (2006)
- Die Liebe kommt selten allein (TV, 2006) Alessa Köster
- Spieltrieb (2012)
