= Aeronauticum =

Aviation museum in Cuxhaven, Germany

Coordinates: 53°46′30″N 8°38′20″E

Aeronauticum is the official German maritime aircraft museum – located in Nordholz (close to Cuxhaven, Lower Saxony). The museum has a large collection of aircraft that has been used by the German Marine/Navy, among other places also in the adjacent Nordholz Naval Airbase. The name of the museum derives from Greek ὰήρ āēr which means "air" and ναυτική nautikē which means "navigation, Airmanship", i.e. "navigation of the air".

== Gallery ==
Aircraft exhibits at Aeronauticum
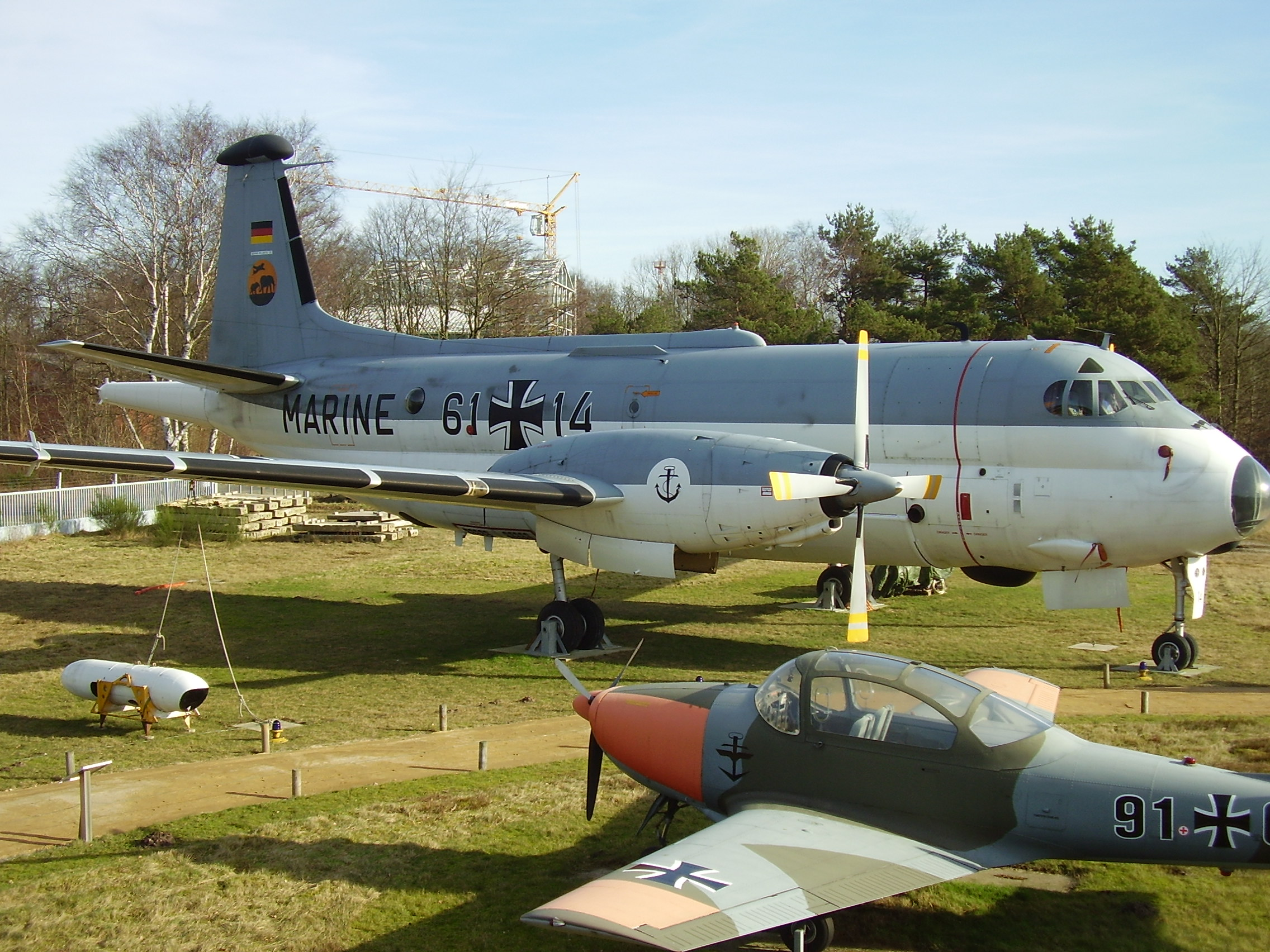
A former Marineflieger Breguet Atlantic

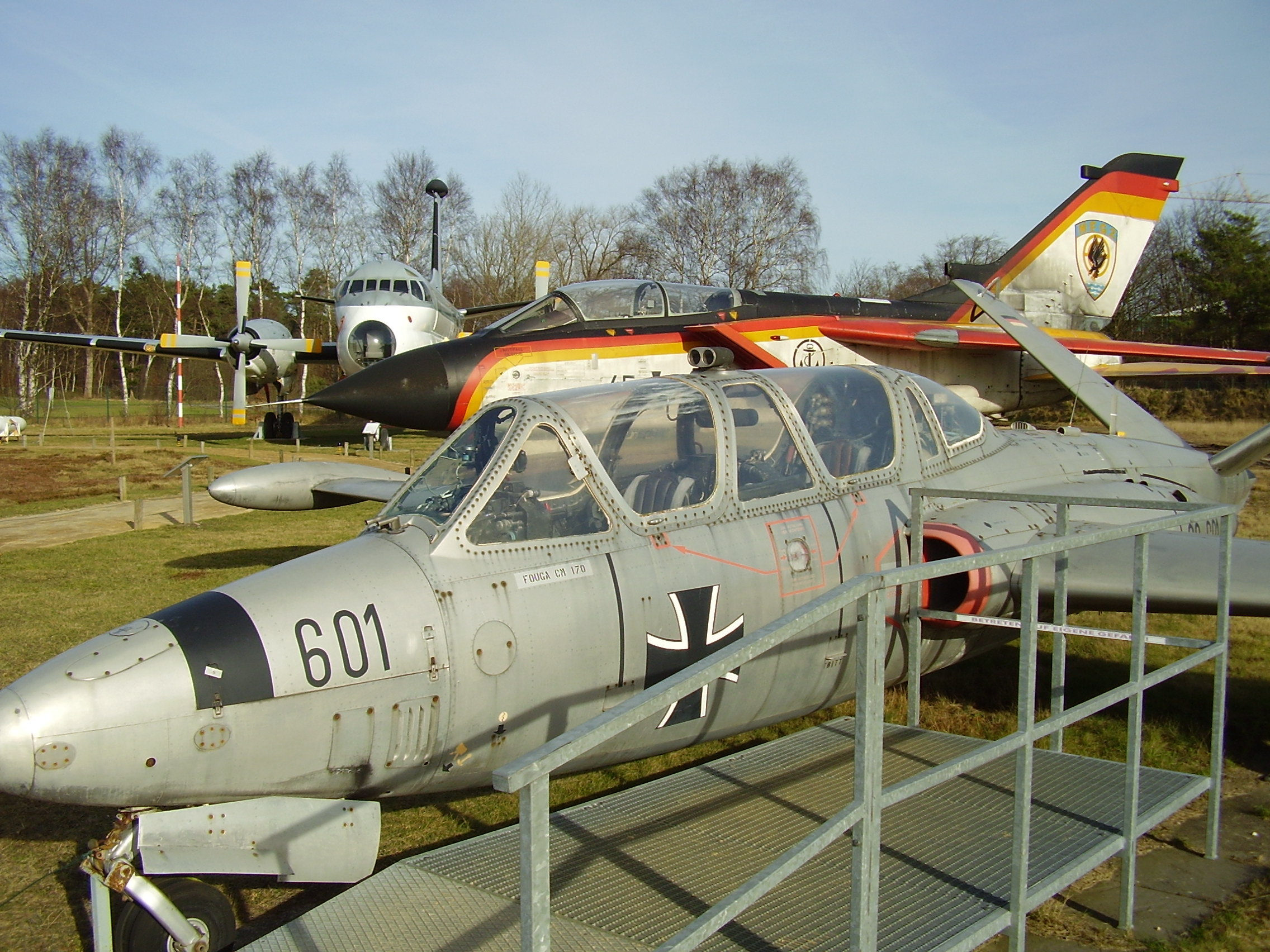
A former Marineflieger Fouga Magister

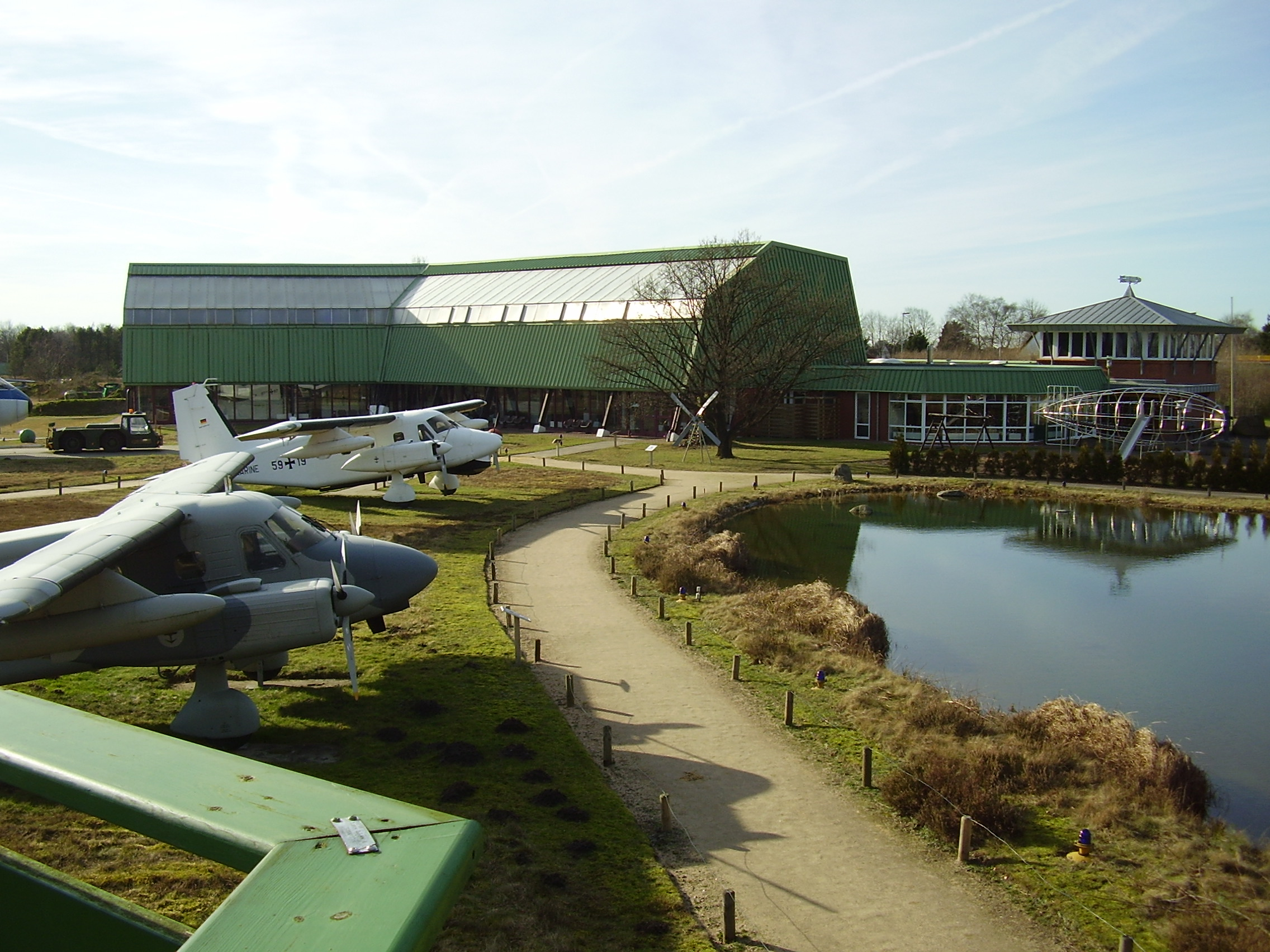
A view of the grounds and the Aeronauticum building

== See also ==
- List of aerospace museums

German Military Museums

- German Tank Museum
- Luftwaffenmuseum der Bundeswehr, German airforce museum in Berlin
- Militärhistorisches Museum der Bundeswehr, major German military museum in Dresden

Naval Aviation museums

- Fleet Air Arm Museum, United Kingdom
- Fleet Air Arm Museum (Australia), Australian museum of naval aviation, Nowra, New South Wales
- National Naval Aviation Museum, United States museum of naval aviation, Naval Air Station Pensacola, Florida
- Naval Aviation Museum (India), Indian naval aviation museum, Goa, India
- Shearwater Aviation Museum, Canadian naval aviation museum, Sheerwater, Nova Scotia.
