= Bremerhaven Airport =

Former German regional airfield in Luneort

Bremerhaven Airport Regionalflughafen Bremerhaven
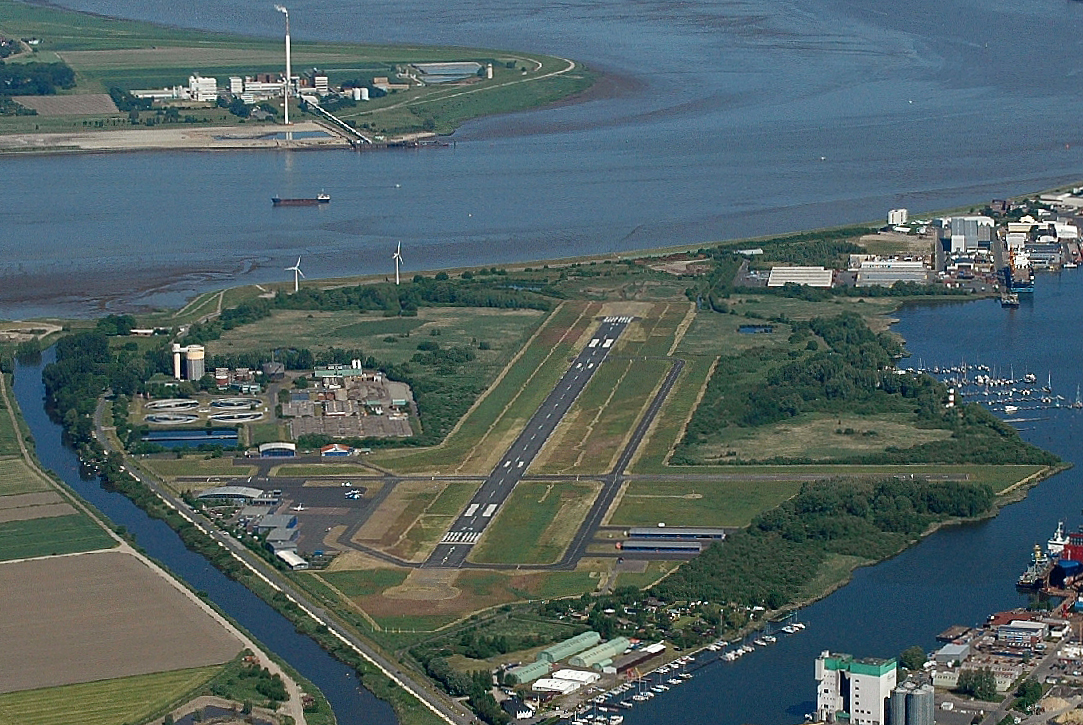
- IATA: BRV; ICAO: EDWB

Summary
- Airport type: Public
- Operator: Flugplatzbetriebs-gesellschaft Bremerhaven mbH
- Serves: Bremerhaven, Germany
- Elevation AMSL: 11 ft (3.4 m)
- Coordinates: 53°30′25″N 08°34′22″E

Map
- Location of the airport in Bremen

Runways
Direction	Length		Surface
Direction	ft	m	Surface
07/25	2,160	658	Asphalt
16/34	3,937	1,200	Asphalt

Bremerhaven Airport (German: Regionalflughafen Bremerhaven or Bremerhaven-Luneort) (IATA: BRV, ICAO: EDWB) was a regional airfield in Luneort, a district of Bremerhaven, Germany, 7.6 km (4.7 mi) from the city center. It was mainly used for general aviation and leisure flying activities. The airfield closed on 29 February 2016 in preparation for demolition, as a new freight seaport was to be built on its site. It was replaced by the new Sea-Airport Cuxhaven/Nordholz (IATA: FCN, ICAO: ETMN) at the jointly used Nordholz Naval Airbase (IATA: NDZ).

== Airlines and destinations ==
Since the evening of 21 February 2016, there have been no regular passenger flights.

== See also ==
- Transport in Germany
- List of airports in Germany
