= Nordholz =

- Ortsteil of Wurster Nordseeküste
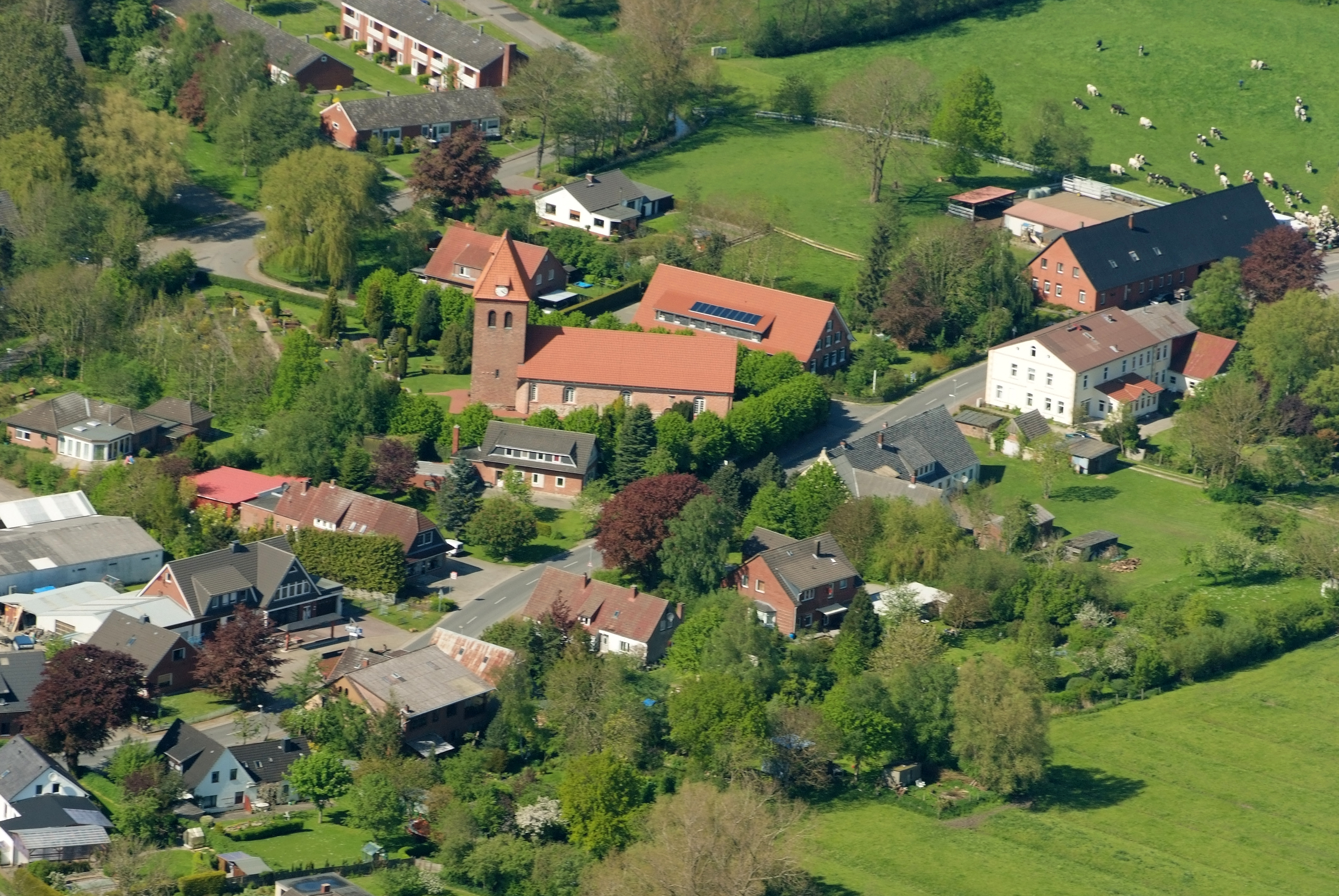
- Aerial photo with St. George Church

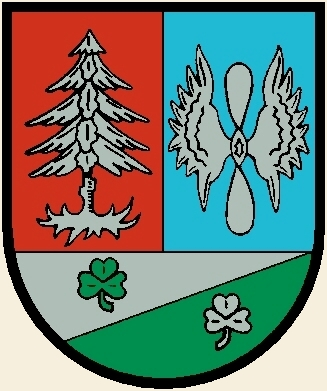
- Coat of arms
- Interactive map of Nordholz
- Location within Germany Location within Lower Saxony
- Coordinates: 53°47′01″N 8°36′20″E
- Country: Germany
- State: Lower Saxony
- District: Cuxhaven
- Municipality: Wurster Nordseeküste

Area
  - Total: 65.11 km^{2} (25.14 sq mi)
- Elevation: 9 m (30 ft)

Population (2013-12-31)
  - Total: 7,248
  - Density: 111.3/km^{2} (288.3/sq mi)
- Time zone: UTC+01:00 (CET)
  - Summer (DST): UTC+02:00 (CEST)
- Postal codes: 27639
- Dialling codes: 04741
- Vehicle registration: CUX

Nordholz (German pronunciation: [ˈnɔʁthɔlts]; Low German: Noordholt) is a village and a former municipality in the district of Cuxhaven, in Lower Saxony, Germany. Since 1 January 2015 it is part of the municipality Wurster Nordseeküste. It is situated approximately 25 km north of Bremerhaven, and 12 km southwest of Cuxhaven.

== History ==
Nordholz belonged to the Prince-Archbishopric of Bremen, established in 1180. In 1648 the Prince-Archbishopric was transformed into the Duchy of Bremen, which was first ruled in personal union by the Swedish Crown - interrupted by a Danish occupation (1712–1715) - and from 1715 on by the Hanoverian Crown. In 1807 the ephemeric Kingdom of Westphalia annexed the Duchy, before France annexed it in 1810. In 1813 the Duchy was restored to the Electorate of Hanover, which - after its upgrade to the Kingdom of Hanover in 1814 - incorporated the Duchy in a real union and the Ducal territory, including Nordholz, became part of the new Stade Region, established in 1823.

== Sights ==
Today, Nordholz houses the Aeronauticum, Germany's official museum of maritime aircraft and the adjacent Nordholz Naval Airbase.
