= Mostly Martha (film) =

2001 film by Sandra Nettelbeck

- Theatrical release poster
- Directed by: Sandra Nettelbeck
- Screenplay by: Sandra Nettelbeck
- Produced by: Karl Baumgartner; Christoph Friedel
- Starring: Martina Gedeck; Sergio Castellitto; Maxime Foerste
- Cinematography: Michael Bertl
- Edited by: Mona Bräuer
- Music by: Manfred Eicher
- Production company: Bavaria Film
- Distributed by: Pandora Film; Ottfilm (through United International Pictures)
- Release dates: 6 August 2001 (Switzerland); 18 April 2002 (Germany)
- Running time: 109 minutes
- Country: Germany
- Languages: German, Italian
- Box office: $5,691,547 (Europe); $4,158,045 (USA)

Mostly Martha (original German title: Bella Martha) is a 2001 German romantic comedy drama film written and directed by Sandra Nettelbeck and starring Martina Gedeck, Maxime Foerste, and Sergio Castellitto. Filmed in Hamburg, Germany, and Italy, the film is about a workaholic chef who is forced to adjust to major changes in her personal and professional life that are beyond her control. The film won the Créteil International Women's Film Festival Grand Prix Award, and was nominated for the Goya Award for Best European Film in 2002. It was also nominated for the German Film Awards Outstanding Feature Film.

== Plot ==
Martha Klein (Martina Gedeck) is a chef at Lido, a gourmet restaurant in Hamburg, Germany. A perfectionist who lives only for her work, Martha has difficulty relating to the world other than through food. Her single-minded obsession with her culinary craft occasionally leads to unpleasant confrontations with customers. Consequently, the restaurant owner, Frida (Sibylle Canonica), requires her to see a therapist (August Zirner) to improve her interpersonal skills. Martha's therapy sessions, however, turn into monologues on food, and her approach to stress management usually involves briefly retreating to the restaurant's walk-in refrigerator.

Martha's life takes a dramatic turn when her sister is killed in a car accident, leaving behind an eight-year-old daughter, Lina (Maxime Foerste). Martha must now look after her niece, who is understandably depressed, withdrawn, and refuses to eat. The girl's Italian father, Giuseppe Lorenzo, has been out of the picture for years, living somewhere in Italy. While coping with her sister's death and raising the young girl, Martha's world is further complicated when Frida hires fun-loving and unorthodox Mario (Sergio Castellitto) as a sous-chef to replace Lea (Katja Studt), who is expecting a child any day. Martha looks on in horror as Mario transforms her kitchen of precision and logistics with his relaxed banter and up-beat music.

Unable to find an acceptable babysitter, Martha brings Lina to the restaurant with her. Lina begins to emerge from her depression in the presence of Mario's playfulness, and even begins to eat when Mario leaves her unattended with a plate of spaghetti he's prepared. Touched by Mario's kindness and concern for the child, Martha becomes more accepting of Mario. She even asks for his help in locating Lina's father in Italy and translating a letter she's written to him.

Just as Martha's strained relationship with Lina seems to be improving, she forgets to collect the girl from school while helping Lea, her very-pregnant sous chef, get to the hospital to deliver her baby. Lina is angry at being forgotten at school, and the incident causes a serious setback in their relationship. To make amends, Martha offers to grant Lina any wish: Lina wants Mario to cook for them. Mario agrees, and prepares a picnic-style dinner in Martha's living room. Despite the mess left behind in the kitchen, the evening of food, stories, and games brings the three closer together.

The renewed warmth between Martha and Lina is immediately tested when Martha is told by the school principal that Lina has not been attending school regularly, and that when she does come to school, she falls asleep. The principal also tells Martha that when he asked the girl why she was always so tired, she told him that she was forced to work in a kitchen to earn her room and board. Angered by Lina's behavior, and also having been warned by the restaurant owner, Martha tells Lina that she can no longer come to the restaurant. Lina storms off, nearly getting hit by a car, and later attempts to run away to Italy. Mario continues to support Martha emotionally as their relationship becomes romantic.

Lina's father, in answer to Martha's letter, arrives to take his daughter to Italy to live with his wife and family. Distraught and conflicted by the separation, Martha rejects Mario's loving support, and after another confrontation with a customer, quits her job. Soon after, Martha asks Mario to accompany her to Italy to retrieve Lina. After reuniting with the girl, Martha and Mario marry, and the three begin their lives together as a loving family.

== Cast ==
- Martina Gedeck as Martha Klein
- Maxime Foerste as Lina Klein (Martha's niece)
- Sergio Castellitto as Mario; voice actor Frank Glaubrecht overdubbed Castellitto's voice.
- August Zirner as Martha's Therapist
- Sibylle Canonica as Frida
- Katja Studt as Lea
- Antonio Wannek as Carlos
- İdil Üner as Bernadette
- Oliver Broumis as Jan
- Ulrich Thomsen as Samuel "Sam" Thalberg
- Gerhard Garbers as Herr Steinberg
- Angela Schmidt as Frau Steinberg
- Diego Ribon as Giuseppe Lorenzo
- W.D. Sprenger as Noisy Customer

== Production ==
=== Filming locations ===
Mostly Martha was filmed from March to May 2000 in Hamburg, Germany, and Italy.

=== Soundtrack ===
The soundtrack is comprised mostly of music by artists from the ECM Records stable, including Keith Jarrett, Steve Reich, David Darling, and Arvo Pärt, with most compositions dating from the 1990s. Manfred Eicher, founder of ECM Records, is credited as music consultant.

- "Country" (Keith Jarrett) by Keith Jarrett, Jan Garbarek, Palle Danielsson, and Jon Christensen
- "Let's Do It in A-Flat" (Steve Reich) by M. Segal, S. Reich, J. Gunkel, and M. Fonfara
- "How Deep Is the Blues" (Steve Reich) by M. Segal, S. Reich, J. Gunkel, and M. Fonfara
- "Too Much of Your Love" (Steve Reich) by M. Segal, S. Reich, J. Gunkel, and M. Fonfara
- "Special Delivery" (Peter Blegvad) by Peter Blegvad
- "Darkwood VII: New Morning" (David Darling) by David Darling
- "Für Alina" (Arvo Pärt) by Alexander Malter
- "Tokyo, Encore" (Keith Jarrett) by Keith Jarrett
- "Angelina – Zooma Zooma" (Roberts, Fisher – Citarrelly, Prima) by Louis Prima
- "Volare" (Franco Migliacci, Domenico Modugno) by Dean Martin
- "Bregenz, Part I" (Keith Jarrett) by Keith Jarrett
- "Via Con Me" (Paolo Conte) by Paolo Conte
- "Attenti Al Lupo" (Ron) by Lucio Dalla
- "Relax-Ay-Voo" (Johns, Salvador) by Dean Martin
- "Never Let Me Go" (Ray Evans, Jay Livingston) by Keith Jarrett, Gary Peacock, and Jack DeJohnette
- "U Dance" (Keith Jarrett) by Keith Jarrett, Gary Peacock, and Jack DeJohnette

== Reception ==
=== Box office ===
Mostly Martha earned $5,691,547 in box office revenue in Europe, and $4,158,045 in the United States. Admissions in Europe include 213,037 (Germany), 38,812 (Netherlands), 1,510 (Norway), and 202,150 (Spain).

=== Critical response ===
Rotten Tomatoes, an aggregator of reviews from published critics, showed that 92% of them reviewed it favorably based on 84 reviews, with an average rating of 7.30/10. The site's critics consensus reads, "Mostly Martha may have a predictable plot, but it still feels charming and fresh, and the food will make you hungry."

In his review in The New York Times, film critic Elvis Mitchell wrote, "The movie itself has a trim, ticking precision, though Manfred Eicher (one of the founders of the ECM jazz label) adds a score that gives the picture a light-handed rhythm. Ms. Nettelbeck seems to have achieved a balance of control and autonomy so that Mostly Martha doesn't feel as if it was directed by its central figure. The final confection is extremely enjoyable, though a few degrees shy of perfection."

In their review in Spirituality & Practice, Frederic and Mary Ann Brussat wrote, "Writer and director Sandra Nettelbeck beautifully orchestrates the transformation of the chilly, neurotic, and self-absorbed Martha as her heart begins to open under the tutelage of Lina and Mario."

In his review in Reel Views, James Berardinelli wrote, "The acting is top-notch. Martina Gedeck is glorious as Martha. ... As Lina, Maxime Foerste gives a natural, unforced performance. ... And Sergio Castellitto is delightful as Mario. ... As much as any other motion picture that employs the preparation and consumption of food as a key element, Mostly Martha provides the perfect blend of cinematic nourishment and gratification."

Manohla Dargis disliked the screenplay, writing "It's a drag how Nettelbeck sees working women—or at least this working woman—for whom she shows little understanding; there's a puritan, even punitive, cast to the way she sees her character, whose pathology she digs at with the tenacity of a truffle hound."

=== Awards and nominations ===
- 2002 Créteil International Women's Film Festival Grand Prix Award (Sandra Nettelbeck)
- 2002 European Film Awards Best Actor (Sergio Castellitto)
- 2002 European Film Awards Nomination Best Actress (Martina Gedeck)
- 2002 German Film Awards Outstanding Individual Achievement Actress (Martina Gedeck)
- 2002 German Film Awards Outstanding Feature Film Nomination (Sandra Nettelbeck)
- 2002 Nantucket Film Festival Best Feature Screenplay (Sandra Nettelbeck)
- 2002 Lecce European Film Festival Special Jury Award (Sandra Nettelbeck)
- 2002 Lecce European Film Festival Students Jury Award (Sandra Nettelbeck)
- 2003 German Film Critics Association Awards Best Actress (Martina Gedeck)
- 2003 Goya Awards Best European Film (Sandra Nettelbeck) - nomination

== Home video ==
A region 2 DVD recording of the film was released in Europe in 2002, and several further editions have been released since. A region 1 DVD recording of the film with English subtitles was also released in North America in 2002.

== Remakes ==
A feature film based on Mostly Martha, retitled No Reservations, was released in the United States in 2007 starring Catherine Zeta-Jones in the role corresponding to Martha. Aaron Eckhart takes on the role corresponding to Mario in Mostly Martha with an American (rather than German/Italian) cultural tension. The film also inspired the Spanish film Chef's Special.
