= Nordholz Naval Airbase =

Nordholz Naval Airbase Flugplatz Nordholz
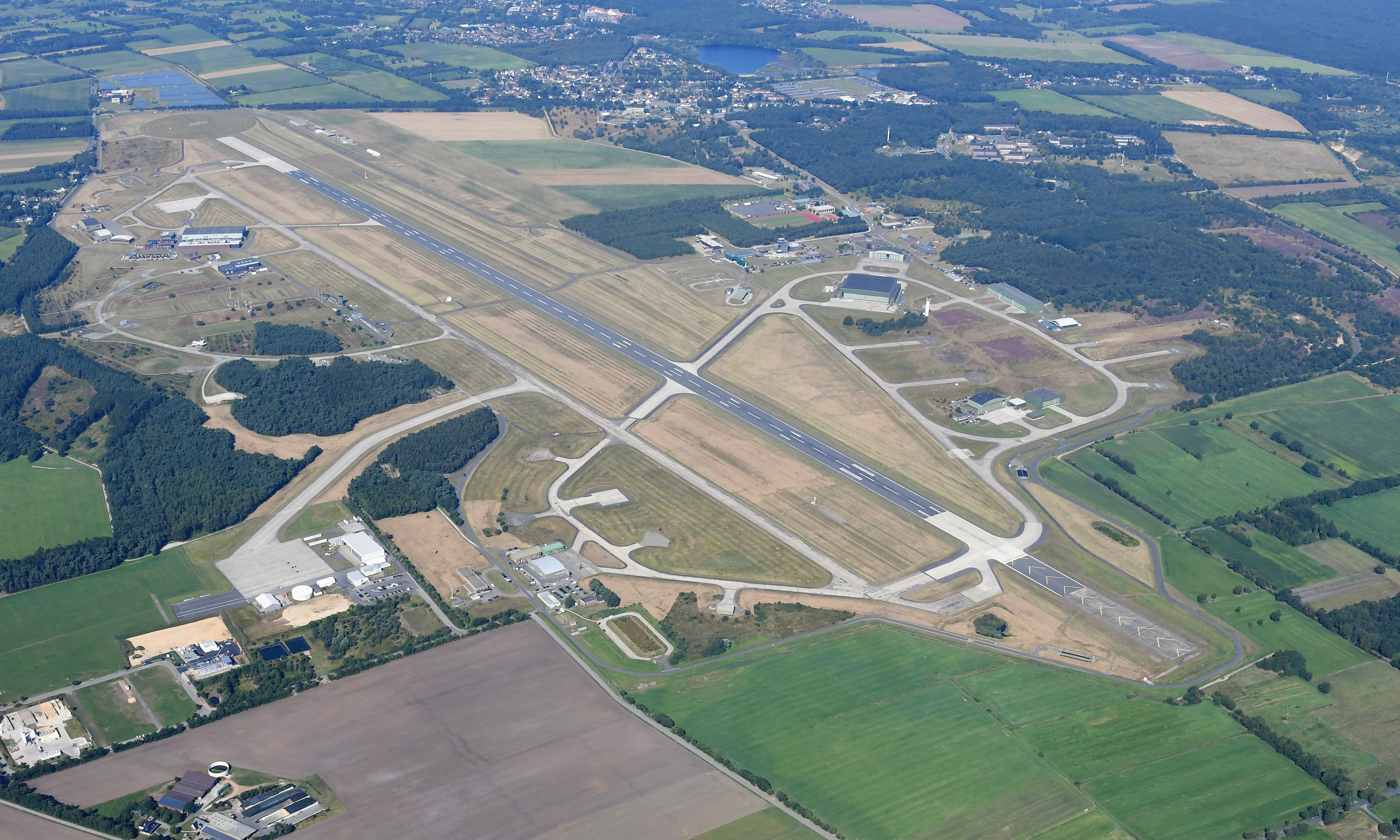
- Nordholz Naval Airbase
- IATA: (civ:FCN); ICAO: ETMN

Summary
- Airport type: Military
- Owner: German Navy
- Operator: Marineflieger (German Naval Air)
- Location: Nordholz, Germany
- Elevation AMSL: 74 ft (23 m)
- Coordinates: 53°46′04″N 008°39′36″E

Map
- Location of Nordholz Naval Airbase

Runways
Direction	Length		Surface
Direction	m	ft	Surface
08/26	2,439	8,002	Concrete

Nordholz Naval Airbase (German: Fliegerhorst Nordholz) (IATA: FCN, ICAO: ETMN) is a German Naval Air base located near the town of Nordholz in Lower Saxony, 25 km north of Bremerhaven, and 12 km southwest of Cuxhaven. It is the home of Naval Air Command (Marinefliegerkommando), with Naval Air Wing 3 (Marinefliegergeschwader 3) and Naval Air Wing 5 (Marinefliegergeschwader 5), equipped with the P-3C Orion, Dornier 228NG, Mk88A Sea Lynx and Mk41 Sea King (last flight August 31, 2024), replaced by NH 90 Sea Lion.

== History ==
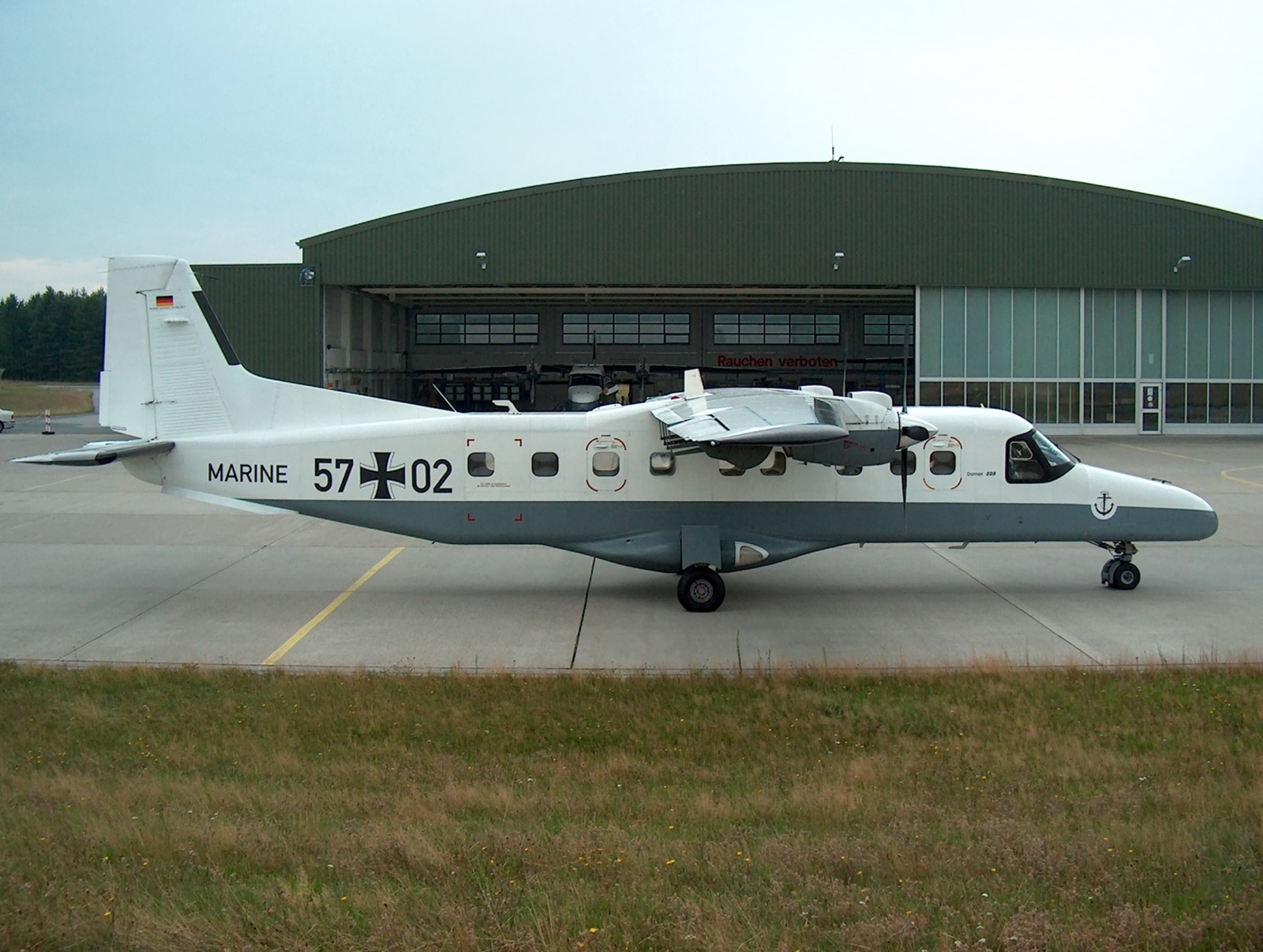
Dornier Do 228LT of Marinefliegergeschwader 3 at Nordholz Air Base.

Nordholz Naval Airbase is one of the oldest airports in Germany, dating to 17 December 1912. Construction of the airport installations started a year later and was finished in 1914.

During World War I Nordholz served as the principal airship base for the Imperial German Navy. The first Zeppelin L 3 landing on 2 September 1914 marked the beginning of flight operations. A month later, the Marine-Luftschiff-Abteilung moved from Hamburg Fuhlsbüttel Airport to Nordholz, with the first anti-aircraft batteries arriving four days later on 18 October. On 25 December the base was one of the targets of the Cuxhaven Raid. German airships started bombing raids on Britain in 1915, initially using German Army Zeppelins; in June 1915, however, German Navy Zeppelins based at Nordholz began attacks on London. Raids against various places in Britain continued until 1918.

On 23 June 1919, Six Zeppelins (LZ 46, LZ 79, LZ 91, LZ103, LZ 110, and LZ 111) were destroyed at Nordholz Airbase by their own crews in order to prevent them from falling into Allied hands. According to the terms of the Treaty of Versailles, all airport installations were dismantled after the war in 1919.

Production number	Class	Name / tactical numbering	Usage	Flight career
LZ 46	P	L 14	9 August 1915	Most successful German Navy airship; 42 reconnaissance missions; 17 attacks on Britain dropping a total of 22,045 kg (48,601 lb) of bombs; taken out of service during 1917 and 1918. Destroyed by its crew on 23 June 1919.
LZ 79	R	L 41	15 January 1917	15 reconnaissance missions around the North Sea; four attacks on England dropping a totalof 6,567 kilograms (14,478 lb)of bombs; used as a school ship from 11 December 1917. Destroyed by its crew on 23 June 1919.
LZ 91	S	L 42	21 February 1917	First of the Height-Climber S class, which had a lightened structure to improve maximum altitude. 20 reconnaissance missions; 4 attacks on England dropping a total of 6,030 kilograms (13,290 lb) of bombs; used as a school ship from 6 June 1918. Destroyed by its crew on 23 June 1919.
LZ 103	V	L 56	24 September 1917	17 reconnaissance missions; participated in the last raid on England on 6 August 1918. Destroyed by its crew on 23 June 1919.
LZ 110	V	L 63	4 March 1918	Dropped a total of 8,915 kg (19,654 lb) of bombs in three attacks on England, including participation in the last raid on England on 6 August 1918. Destroyed by its crew on 23 June 1919.
LZ 111	V	L 65	17 April 1918	Participated in the last raid on England on 6 August 1918. Destroyed by its crew on 23 June 1919.

=== Luftwaffe use ===
Flying returned to Nordholz in 1938, when the Luftwaffe decided to rebuild the airfield. At the outbreak of World War II the Jagdgeschwader 77 Herz As (ace of hearts) fighter wing stationed Messerschmitt Bf 109E fighters at the airfield. These were supplemented by several groups of JG 1, tasked with defending the North Sea shores against British Royal Air Force (RAF) attacks.

During the occupation of Denmark and Norway, Kampfgruppe 100 Wiking flew attacks from Nordholz with their Heinkel He 111 medium bombers, before its enlargement into KG 100.

Between 1941 and 1943 Nordholz was not used, but the Luftwaffe returned in March 1943, as 3.Staffel/JG 54 Grünherz moved to Nordholz. 3./JG 26 Schlageter followed in June and 2./JG 11 in August. All units, flying Bf 109F and -G day fighters stayed only a few weeks in northern Germany, before moving to the Eastern Front or along the English Channel. The base's role changed in October 1943 when it was turned into a night fighter base with 7./NJG 3 moved from Stade to Nordholz. At the end of the war, between January and April 1945, Nordholz had the honor of hosting the Messerschmitt Me 163B Komet rocket-powered fighter aircraft coming from parts of 2./JG 400.

=== Postwar use ===
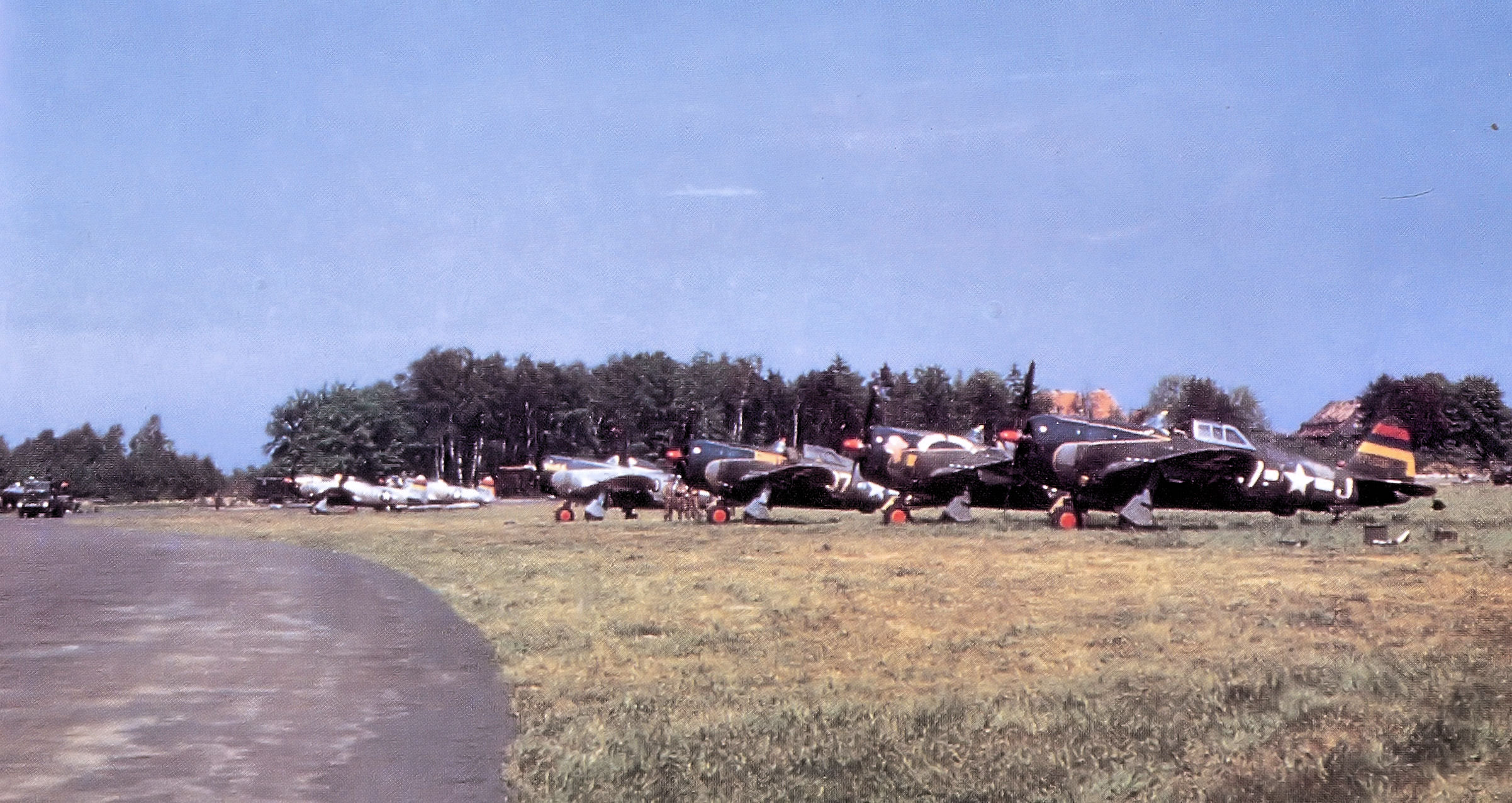
406th Fighter Group P-47 Thunderbolts, AAF Station Nordholz, Germany, June 1945.

The airfield was occupied by U.S. forces on 16 May 1945 as part of the American Zone of Occupation in the Bremen area, an enclave surrounded by the British zone. The United States Army Air Forces moved into the airfield on 5 June and it served as home for P-47 Thunderbolts of 86th Fighter Group 512th and 513th Fighter Squadrons, flying air defense missions from the base over the Bremen area. Initially given the designation of Advanced Landing Ground "R-56", it was renamed Army Air Force Station Nordholtz, or simply Nordholz Air Base. After reducing the boundary of the American enclave to the borders of the State of Bremen in 1947 the airfield, located in Lower Saxony, was handed over to the RAF, who began dismantling the airport installations and destroying the three concrete runways.

=== NATO use ===
Situated to the north of Bremen city, Marinefliegerhorst (Naval Air Station) Nordholz is the home of the German Navy's Marinefliegergeschwader 3 "Graf Zeppelin". Named in honour of Germany's pioneer of lighter than air airships, Ferdinand von Zeppelin, the MFG 3 operates both the service's long range maritime patrol and shipborne helicopter fleets. Additionally, MFG 3 also flies the Dornier Do.228 environmental patrol aircraft which belong to the Department of Transport. The slogan "fliegen wo die Flotte fährt" (to fly where the fleet sails) is taken seriously by this unit.

In 1959 construction of the current airbase began. This time a single runway airfield was constructed according to NATO standards, which was to serve as a Naval Air Station. Building ended in 1962, with the first parts of MFG 2 arriving in July. On 26 April 1963 the airfield was officially put into service, though the usability of the base was still limited.

A year later the subhunting component of MFG 2 moved from Westerland on Sylt to Nordholz. In 1965 the airfield was officially handed over to the planning staffs of MFG 3.

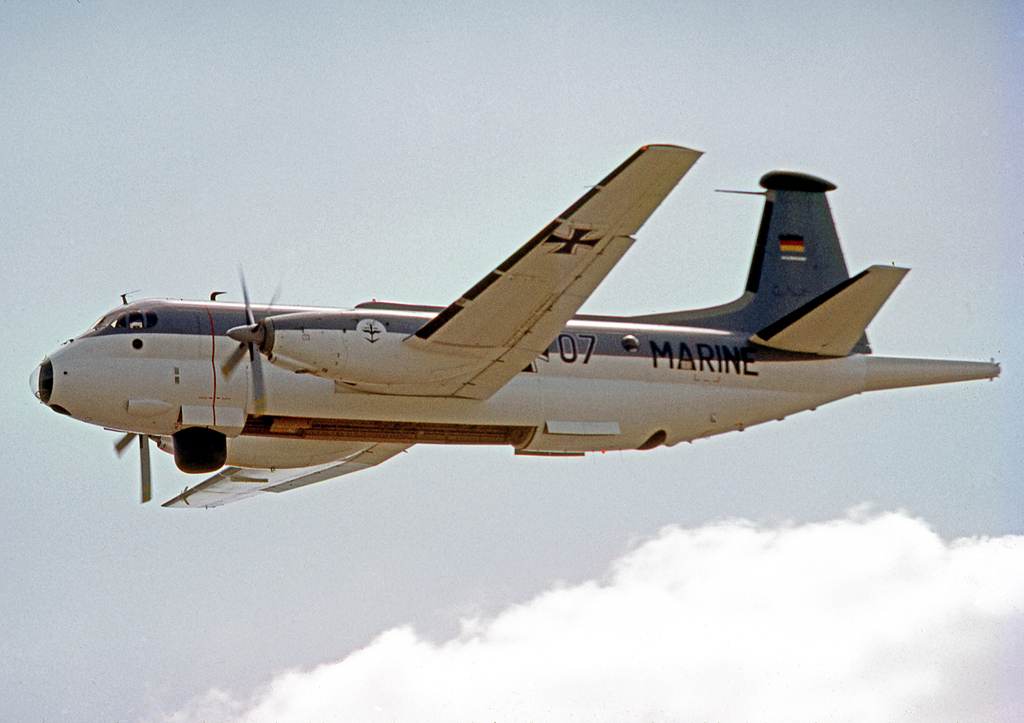
Breguet Atlantic of MFG 3 in 1973.

Since 1966, the Breguet Br.1150 Atlantic has been the German Navy's anti submarine warfare and long range maritime patrol asset. The type replaced the British supplied Fairey Gannets used for a few years during the 1960s. The Atlantic is unique in that it has been designed for this mission specifically from scratch. The other Western types with the same mission, the American P-3 Orion and the British Nimrod, found their origins in respectively the Electra and Comet civil transports. A total of 20, excluding a non-flying prototype, were delivered to MFG 3 during 1966 and 1967.

MFG 3 was left as the only unit at Nordholz, when the final two Noratlas of "Passon" left the airbase in 1981. The civil airgroup provided aerial targets over the North and Baltic Sea since 1964.

Nordholz was used for several Cold War NATO deployments of United States Air Force/Air National Guard units during the annual "Reforger" exercises.

Out of the 20 Atlantics, five were converted during 1969 and 1970 into signals intelligence (SIGINT) aircraft, specialised in electronic reconnaissance of hostile radar systems and communications of what used to be the Eastern Bloc. Under the code name of Peace Peek, the conversions were done by E-systems in the United States. Today, three of these machines survive, among them 61+06 depicted left. One of these has already been scrapped, the other has been broken up for spares. They can easily be distinguished by their differing radome under the fuselage. The SIGINT machines proved especially useful during the NATO Kosovo operations of 1999. It may be that the SIGINT Atlantics will be replaced with a variant of the Northrop-Grumman RQ-4 Global Hawk UAV, if funds can be found.

Out of the 15 standard Atlantics, only eight survived. One was lost in a crash in April 1978, the others have already been scrapped or relegated to ground instructional duties. Nevertheless, the type was kept busy until just a few years ago. From early 2002 a detachment of Atlantics flew lengthy patrol missions from Mombasa, Kenya over the Indian Ocean looking for suspected shipping in the war on terror. In September 2003, the detachment, then known as 15. Einsatzgruppe der Marinefliegerflottille (EinsGrpMFlgFltl) or 15th Operations Group Naval Air Forces moved north to Djibouti. The detachment was terminated in March 2005. Since 2008 the detachment is continued by flying with their new P-3C Orion acquired from the Royal Netherlands Navy.

Nordholz currently operates a mix of Lockheed P-3C Orions, Mk88A Sea Lynx, Mk41 Sea King and the Dornier Do 228NG. Some 2,000 civilian and military personnel are based at Nordholz, with the wing providing surveillance & reconnaissance, anti-submarine search, SAR and pollution control operations. However the Mk41 are sanctioned to be replaced in the next few years by NH90 helicopters which are currently on order for the German Navy.

== Nearby ==
Just a bit further off is the Aeronauticum aviation museum.

=== Nordholz-Spieka recreational airfield ===
Immediately north of the base is the grass runway of the Nordholz-Spieka recreational airfield in Spieka.

==== Airlines and destinations ====
The following airlines offer regular scheduled and charter flights at Nordholz-Spieka recreational airfield:

Airlines	Destinations
OFD Ostfriesischer Flugdienst	Heligoland

== See also ==
- Advanced Landing Ground
- Aeronauticum, the aviation museum adjacent to the airbase
