= Razmataz =

Studio album by Paolo Conte
- Released: 2000
- Recorded: 2000

Razmataz is a 2000 album, partly-animation DVD, and book by Italian jazz musician Paolo Conte. The album book and animation tell the story of Razmataz, a Harlem dancer and her troupe, in the Paris of the 1920s. Conte stated that "It is a story about the meeting between old Europe and young black music."

== Track listing ==
1. "Razzmatazz" – 2:08
2. "Paris, les paris" – 2:30
3. "Guaracha" – 3:12
4. "La reine noire" – 1:41
5. "It's a green dream (1)" – 2:56
6. "Ça depend" – 2:09
7. "Talent scout man" – 3:18
8. "Aigrette et sa valse" – 1:34
9. "The yellow dog" – 3.13
10. "La danse" – 0:27
11. "The black Queen" – 4:37
12. "La java javanaise" – 2:28
13. "That's my opinion" – 2:10
14. "Guitars" – 1:42
15. "La petite tendresse" – 3:56
16. "Pasta "diva"" – 1:02
17. "It's a green dream (2)" – 3:49
18. "Mozambique fantasy (ouverture)" – 8:20
