= Via con me =

"Via con Me"

Song by Paolo Conte

from the album Paris milonga
- Released: 1981
- Genre: Jazz
- Length: 3:15
- Label: RCA Italiana
- Songwriter: Paolo Conte
- Producer: Lilli Greco

Audio
- "Via con me" on YouTube

"Via con Me" (transl. Away with me), also known as "Via con Me (It's Wonderful)", is a 1981 Italian song composed and performed by Paolo Conte.

== Overview ==
The song is considered one of Conte's signature songs. Although the album which included it, Paris milonga, did not sell very well at the time of its release, it later became a long-seller thanks to the song's popularity. The song's lyrics include some of Conte's major themes, such as life in a small town, existentialism, and desire to escape into the unknown.

Cover versions of the song were recorded among others by Neri per Caso and Roberto Benigni, which included his version in his directorial debut film Tu mi turbi. The song was included in many other film soundtracks, notably Les Maris, les Femmes, les Amants (1989), French Kiss (1995), A Couch in New York (1996), Mostly Martha (2001), Welcome to Collinwood (2002), Marie and Bruce (2004), No Reservations (2007), Elvis and Anabelle (2007), SMS für Dich (2016) and Deep Water (2022), in which was performed on the piano by Ana de Armas. The Rai 3 television show Vieni via con me was named after it, and had "Via con me" as opening theme.
