= Château Val Joanis =

Winery in Provence-Alpes-Côte d'Azur, France

Coordinates: 43.7112°N 5.4688°E

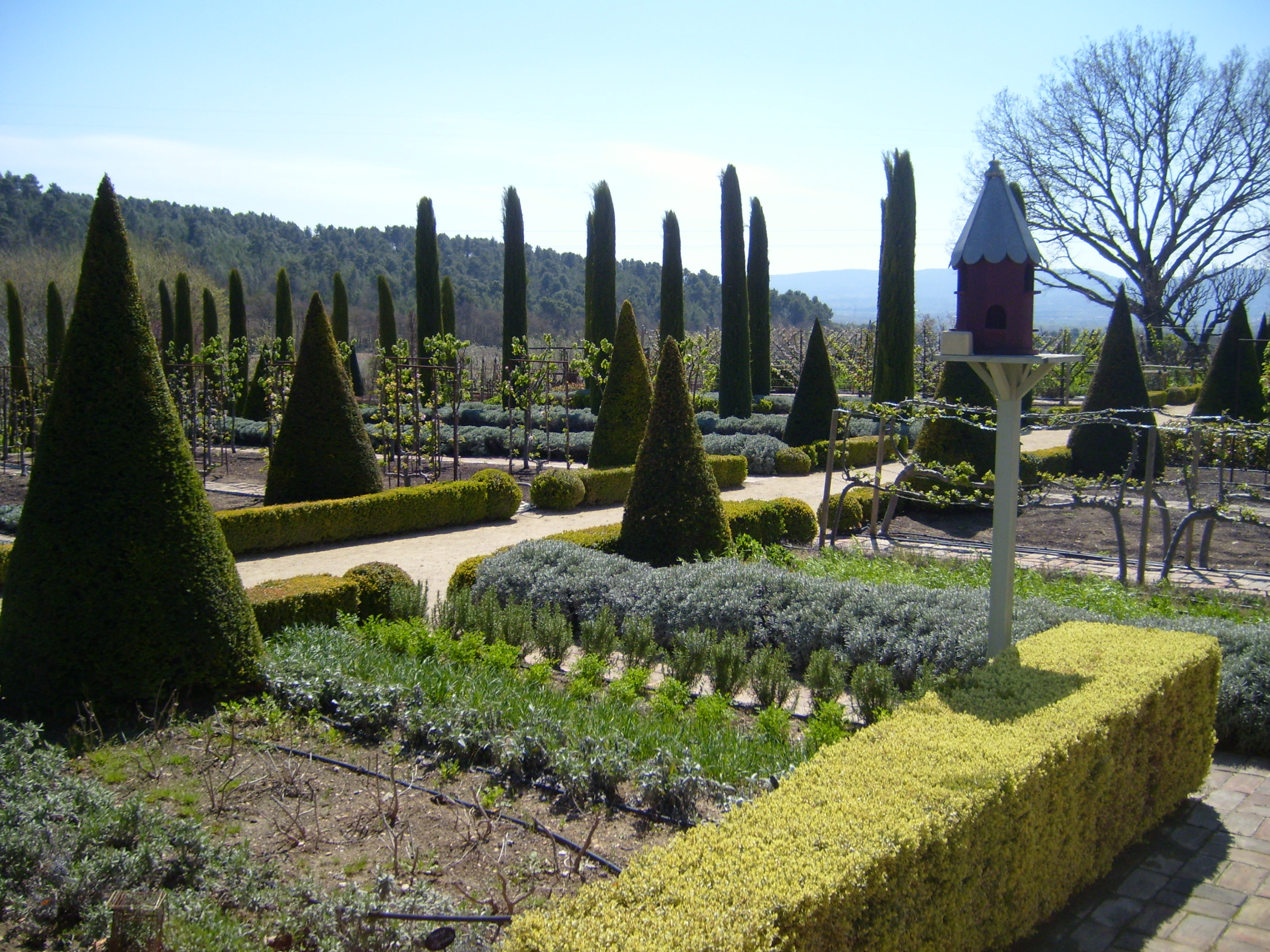
Garden of Château Val Joanis

Château Val Joanis is a winery located in the Vaucluse Department of France, in the region of Provence-Alpes-Côte d'Azur, just west of the town of Pertuis. The wines it produces are classified AOC Côtes du Luberon. The gardens of the winery are listed by the Committee of Parks and Gardens of the French Ministry of Culture as one of the Remarkable Gardens of France.

== History ==
The Chateau is built on the site of an ancient Roman villa, some of whose stones today decorate the garden. The building is decorated with the coat of arms of Jean de Joanis, the secretary of the King Louis III of Naples. The estate was occupied by the Arnaud family, who kept it until the 17th century. The estate was given the status of a fief in 1754.

The house and estate fell into ruins during the 19th century. It was purchased in 1977 by Jean-Louis Chancel. Between 1979 and 1999, he planted 186 hectares of vines. He also commissioned the architect Jean-Jacques Pichoux to build a modern winery building, inspired by the architectural style of the Dominican Order.

== The gardens ==
The gardens were begun in 1978 by the owner, Cécile Chancel, with the help of landscape designer Tobie Loup de Viane. The garden was finished in its present form in 1990 and became a Remarkable Garden of France in 2005. The garden is built on three terraces cut into a hillside overlooking the vineyards.

- The upper terrace is a kitchen garden and flower garden.
- The middle terrace is devoted to flowers and ornamental plants.
- The lower terrace is devoted to fruit trees, and to platane trees over twenty years of age brought from Mount Athos.

The three terraces are linked by a pergola, or tunnel, covered with climbing roses and trumpet vines, which runs from the top to the bottom of the garden.

== Wines ==
The winery produces seven wines under the label AOC Côtes du Luberon, and also uses the indication géographique protégée (IGP) label Vins de Pays de Vaucluse

The AOC wines of Château de Val Joanis are made with Grenache and Syrah grapes for the red wines and rosés and Grenache blanc, Roussanne, and Ugni blanc for the whites.

The wine with the label IGP is the Réserve Les Agasses, a white wine made with 100% Viognier grapes.

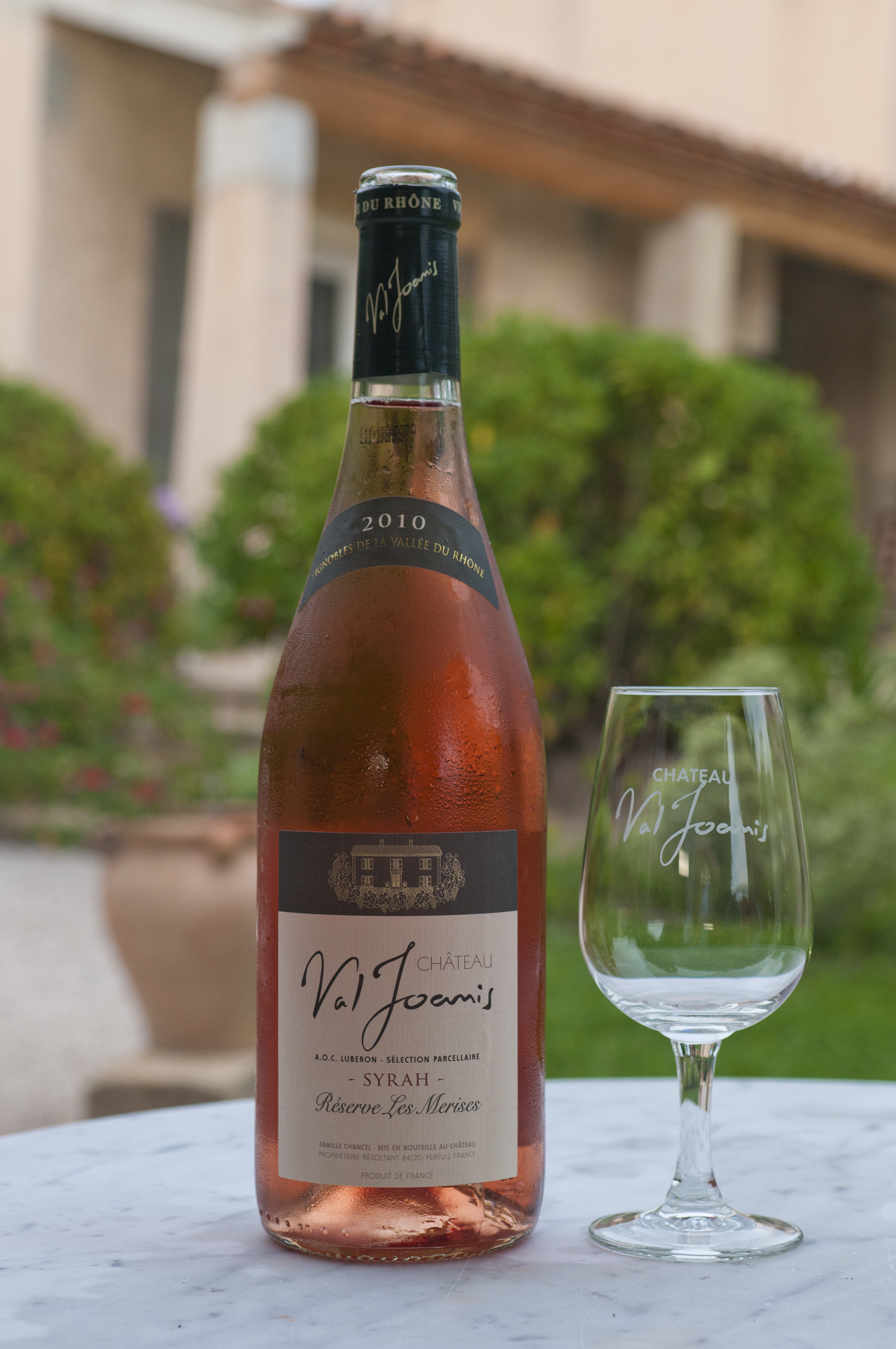
Château de Val Joanis, Réserve les Marises, 2010

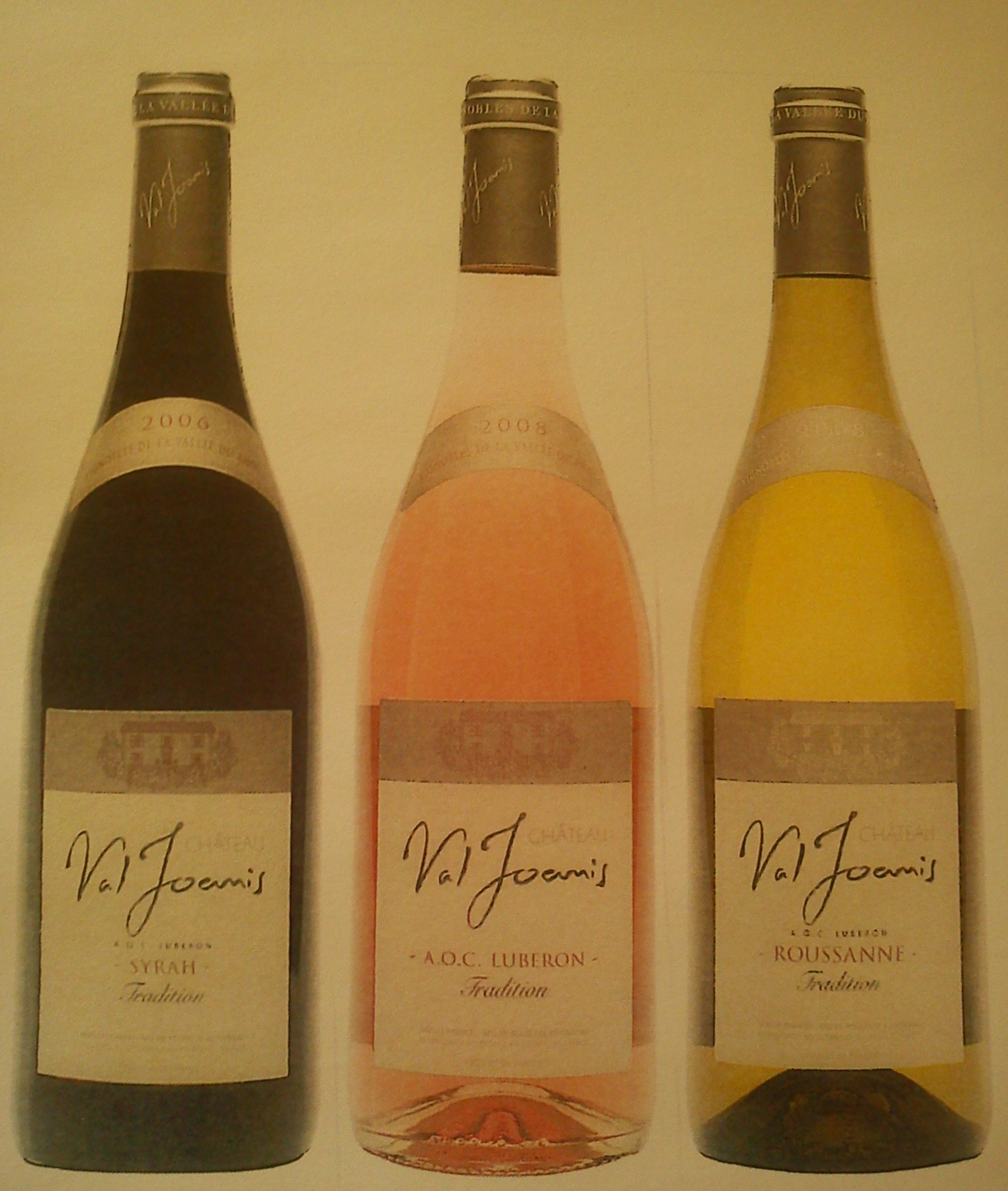
AOC Château de Val Joanis rouge, rosé et blanc

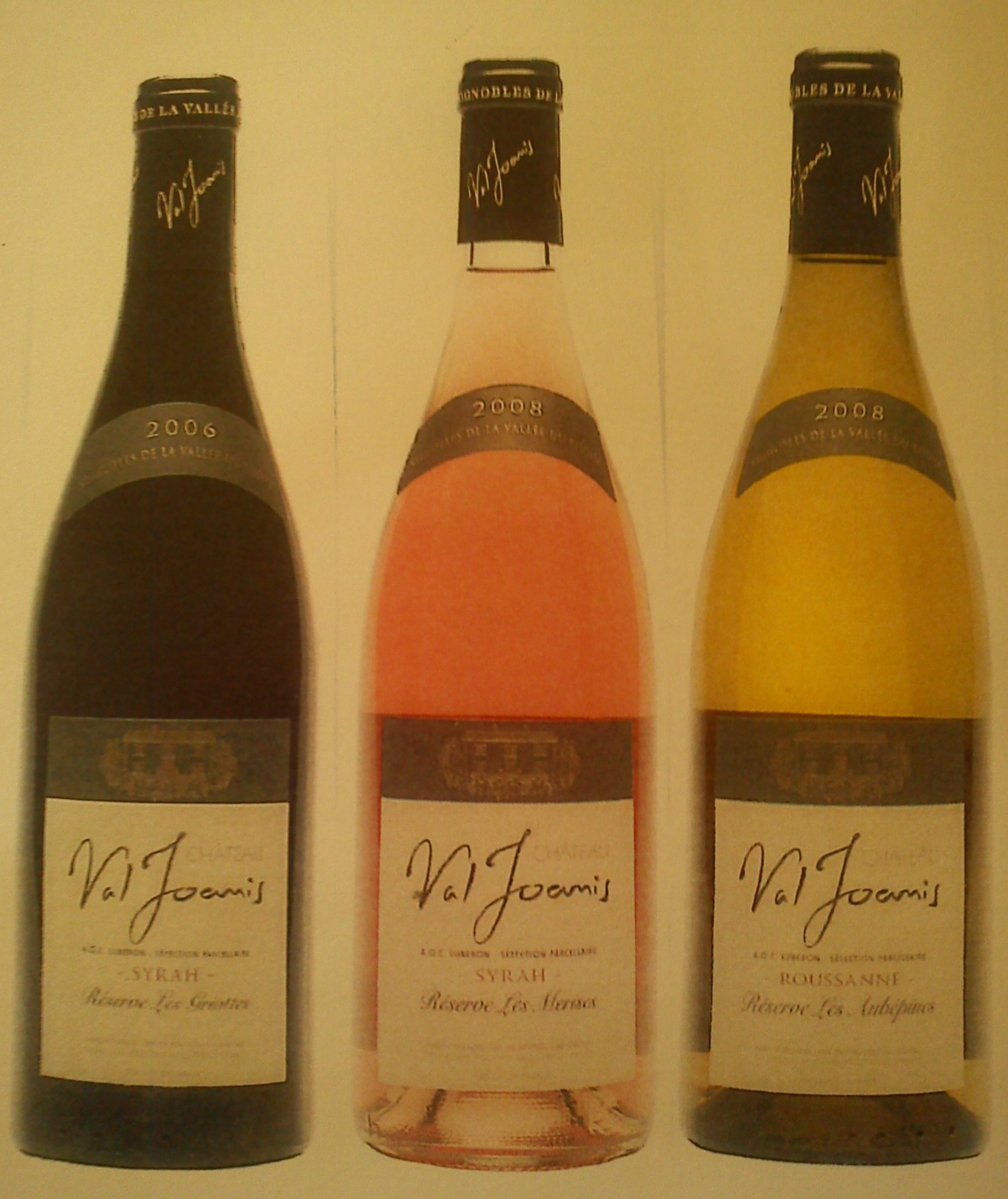
AOC Réserve Les Griottes
AOC Réserve Les Merises, AOC Réserve Les Aubépines

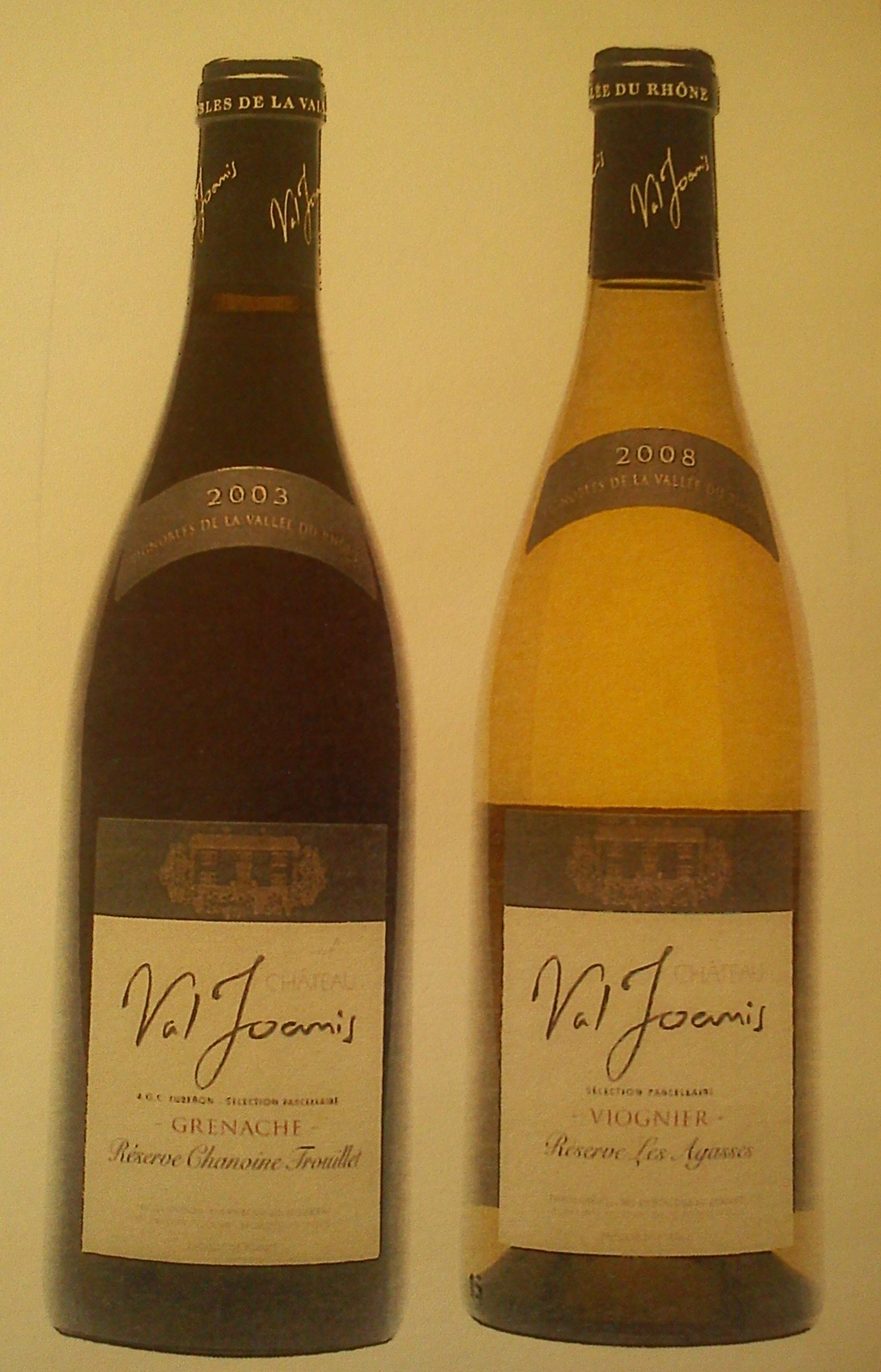
AOC Réserve Chanoine Trouillet, IGP Réserve Les Agasses

== Bibliography ==
- Marie-Françoise Valéry, Jardins de France en fleurs, Taschen, Paris, 2008. (ISBN 978-3-8365-0308-2).
