= MV Bremerhaven =

- The Stella Maris II at sea.

History
- Name: 1960-1965: MV Bremerhaven; 1965-1998: Stella Maris II; 1998-2004: Viking Bordeaux; 2004: Bordeaux; 2005-2006: Madagascar; 2006-2008: Razzmatazz
- Operator: 1960-1965: Argo Reedereis; 1965-1998: Sun Lines; 1998-2004: Viking Cruises; 2005-2006: Indian Ocean Cruises; 2007-2008: Razzmatazz Ocean Cruises
- Builder: Adler Werft, Germany
- Launched: April 2, 1960
- In service: 1961
- Out of service: 2006
- Identification: IMO number: 5051365
- Fate: Scrapped, 2008

General characteristics
- Tonnage: 3,008 gross register tons (GRT)
- Length: 289 feet
- Beam: 43 feet
- Speed: 12.5 knots
- Capacity: 171 (normal); 212 (maximum); 93 (crew)

The MV Bremerhaven was a cruise ship originally built in Germany in 1960 for ferry services. She served under different guises and owners until she was scrapped in 2008.

== History ==
Bremerhaven was launched on April 2, 1960, for Bremen-Helgoland ferry route under the ownership of Argo Reederei. In 1965 Bremerhaven partially sank in shallow waters, subsequently being raised and made seaworthy. However, her original owners placed her on the market, selling her to the Sun Lines in 1965. Sun Lines had the newly renamed Stella Maris II heavily rebuilt, changing her superstructure practically entirely and replacing her tall, slim funnel that was placed amidships with a wider, shorter funnel placed aft. Throughout her long career with Sun Lines Stella Maris II served in the Mediterranean, Caribbean and Amazon. In 1996 Sun Lines merged with the Epirotiki. After more than 30 years of service with Sun Lines Stella Maris II was sold to Viking Cruises in 1998. Under this new ownership she became the Viking Bordeaux. She operated under this name until 2004 when she was laid up. During her lay up in the Netherlands the ship was renamed Bordeaux. Shortly thereafter the ship was purchased by Indian Ocean Cruises, who expensively refitted and renamed her the Madagascar. After a very short amount of cruises from Durban this new venture failed as she was not fit for the rough waters of the area. Madagascar was docked in Durban uneventfully for three years. She was then purchased to become the Razzmatazz of Razzmatazz Ocean Cruises. This venture fell through, and the ship was towed to scrapyards at Alang in India and broken up in August 2008.
