= Fourteen Holy Helpers =

Group of Christian saints

Saints Fourteen Holy Helpers
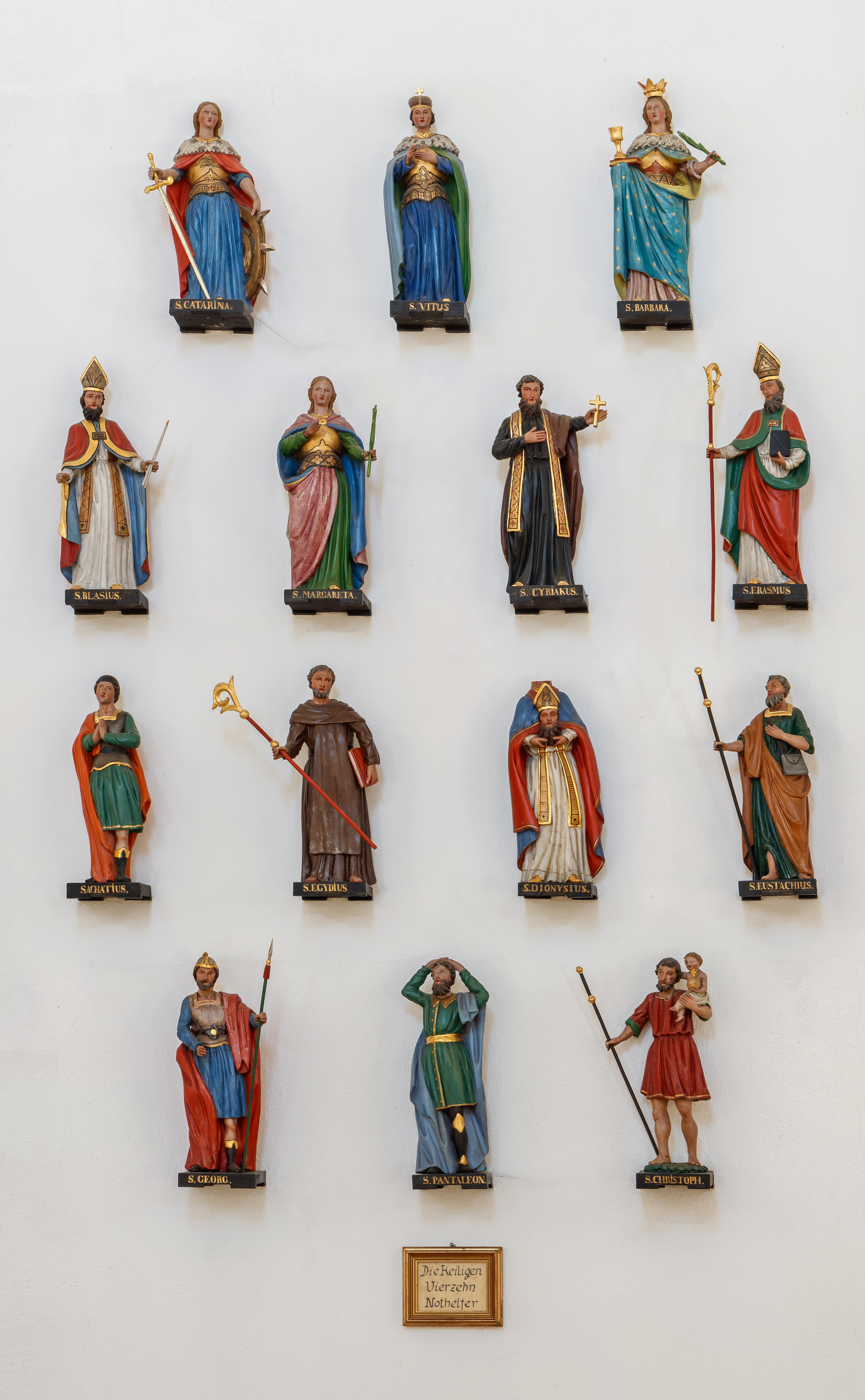
- Figurines of the Fourteen Holy Helpers, Chapel on the Michaelsberg, Baden-Württemberg, Germany
- Venerated in: Catholic Church
- Feast: 8 August (locally)
- Notable martyrs: Saints Acacius, Barbara, Blaise, Christopher, Cyriacus, Catherine of Alexandria, Denis, Erasmus of Formia, Eustace, George, Giles, Margaret of Antioch, Pantaleon, and Vitus.

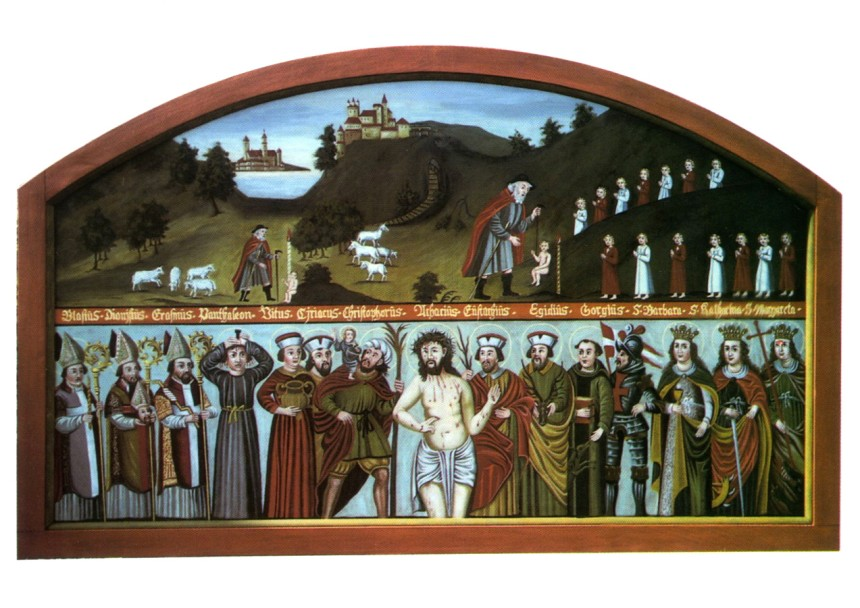
Painting of the Fourteen Holy Helpers

The Fourteen Holy Helpers (German: Vierzehn Nothelfer; Latin: Quattuordecim auxiliatores) are a group of saints venerated together by Catholics because their intercession is believed to be particularly effective, especially against various diseases. This group of Nothelfer ("helpers in need") originated in the 14th century at first in the Rhineland, largely as a result of the epidemic (probably of bubonic plague) that became known as the Black Death.

== History of veneration ==
Devotion to the fourteen Holy Helpers began in Rhineland, now part of Germany, in the time of the Black Death. Among the fourteen were three virgin martyrs. A German mnemonic for them says:

Margaretha mit dem Wurm,
Barbara mit dem Turm,
Katharina mit dem Radl
das sind die drei heiligen Madl.

("Margaret with the lindworm,
Barbara with the tower,
Catherine with the wheel,
those are the three holy maids.")

As the other saints began to be invoked along with these three virgin martyrs, they were represented together in works of art. Popular veneration of these saints often began in a monastery that held their relics. All of the saints except Giles were accounted martyrs.

Saint Christopher and Saint Giles were invoked against the plague itself. Saint Denis was prayed to for relief from headache, Saint Blaise against ills of the throat, Saint Elmo, against abdominal maladies, Saint Barbara against fever, and Saint Vitus against epilepsy. Saint Pantaleon was the patron of physicians, Saint Cyriacus invoked against temptation on the deathbed, and Saints Christopher, Barbara, and Catherine of Alexandria for protection against a sudden and unprovided-for death. Saint Giles was prayed to for a good confession, and Saint Eustace as healer of family troubles. Domestic animals were also attacked by the plague, and so Saints George, Elmo, Pantaleon, and Vitus were invoked for their protection. Saint Margaret of Antioch is the patron of safe childbirth.

As the saints' joint cultus spread in the fifteenth century, Pope Nicholas V attached indulgences to devotion of the Fourteen Holy Helpers, though these no longer apply. While each had a separate feast day, the Fourteen Holy Helpers were in some places celebrated as a group on 8 August, but this celebration never became part of the General Roman Calendar for universal veneration. When that calendar was revised in 1969, the individual celebrations of St Barbara, St Catherine of Alexandria, St Christopher, and St Margaret of Antioch were dropped, but in 2004 Pope John Paul II reinstated the 25 November optional memorial of Catherine of Alexandria, whose voice was heard by Saint Joan of Arc. The individual celebrations of all fourteen are included in the General Roman Calendar as in 1954, the General Roman Calendar of Pope Pius XII and the General Roman Calendar of 1960.

Comparable to the devotion of the Fourteen Holy Helpers was that of the Four Holy Marshals, who were also venerated in the Rhineland as "Marshals of God". These were Quirinus of Neuss, Saint Anthony the Great, Pope Cornelius, and Saint Hubert.

== The Auxiliary Saints ==
The fourteen saints are:

| Name (Alternate) | Feast day | Patronage |
|---|---|---|
| Agathius (Acacius) | 7 May | Against headache. |
| Barbara | 4 December | Against fever and sudden death, against lightning and fire, and against sudden and violent death at work; patron of builders, artillerymen, and miners. |
| Blaise (Blase, Blasius) | 3 February | Against illness of the throat and for protection of domestic animals. |
| Catherine of Alexandria | 25 November | Against sudden death and diseases of the tongue; patron of philosophers, theologians, maidens, female students, preachers, the dying, wheelwrights, mechanics, potters, and other artisans who work with wheels; invoked by students, orators, preachers, and lawyers for wise counsel and for eloquence. |
| Christopher (Christophorus) | 25 July | Against bubonic plague and dangers while traveling. |
| Cyriacus | 8 August | Against temptation on the death-bed, diseases of the eye, and demonic possession. |
| Denis (Dionysius) | 9 October | Against headache and against demonic possession. |
| Erasmus (Elmo) | 2 June | Against intestinal ailments, stomach ailments, for domestic animals, and patron of sailors. |
| Eustace (Eustachius, Eustathius) | 20 September | Against family discord, against fire (temporal and eternal), and patron of hunters, trappers, and anyone facing trouble. |
| George (Georgius) | 23 April | For the health of domestic animals, against herpetic diseases, and patron of soldiers. |
| Giles (Aegidius) | 1 September | Against plague, epilepsy, mental illness, and nightmares, for a good confession, and patron of cripples, beggars, blacksmiths, and breast-feeding mothers. |
| Margaret of Antioch | 17 July | Patron of women in childbirth, invoked against backache, and invoked for escape from devils. |
| Pantaleon (Panteleimon) | 27 July | Patron of physicians and midwives, invoked for the protection of domestic animals, and invoked against cancer and tuberculosis. |
| Vitus (Guy) | 15 June | Against epilepsy, chorea, lightning, the bites of animals (especially those who were venomous or rabid), and storms, and for protection of domestic animals. |

Half the saints are regarded as historical figures (Blaise, Cyriacus, Erasmus, George, Giles, Pantaleon, Vitus) while the other may be only legends (Agathius, Barbara, Catherine of Alexandria, Christopher, Denis, Eustace, Margaret of Antioch). The supposition that some are "legendary" is primarily based on analysis of the saints' traditional hagiographies without due consideration of other possibilities and interpretations, as well as the changes associated with the Mysterii Paschalis, although not all these changes applied to these particular saints. While the feasts of several of the Fourteen Holy Helpers were removed from the General Roman Calendar, none were decanonized or denied to have existed and their feasts remain on particular calendars.

For one or another of the saints in the original set, Anthony the Anchorite, Leonard of Noblac, Nicholas, Sebastian, Oswald the King, Pope Sixtus II, Apollonia, Dorothea of Caesarea, Wolfgang of Regensburg or Roch were sometimes substituted. In France an extra "helper" is added: the Virgin Mary.

== The Basilica of the Vierzehnheiligen ==
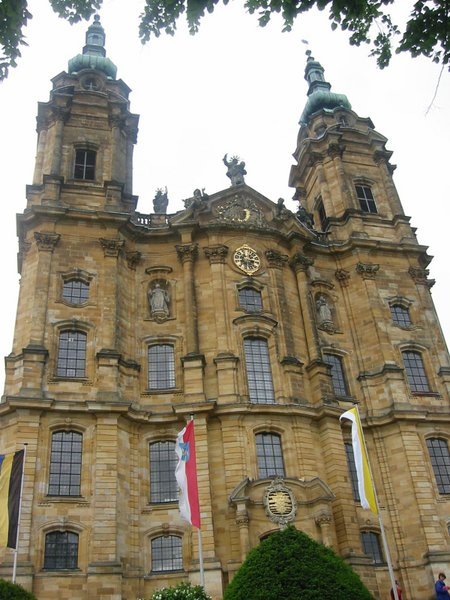
Basilika Vierzehnheiligen

The Fourteen Holy Helpers are honored in Bavaria as the vierzehn Heiligen, and the Basilica of the Vierzehnheiligen is dedicated to these auxiliary saints. The Rococo pilgrimage church near the town of Bad Staffelstein was designed by Balthasar Neumann and built between 1743 and 1772.

Devotion to these saints began in that region on 24 September 1445 when Hermann Leicht, the young shepherd of a nearby Franciscan monastery, saw a crying child in a field belonging to the nearby Cistercian monastery of Langheim. As he bent down to pick up the child, it abruptly disappeared. A short time later, the child reappeared in the same spot. This time, two candles were burning next to it. In June 1446, Leicht saw the child a third time. This time, the child bore a red cross on its chest and was accompanied by thirteen other children. The child said: "We are the fourteen helpers and wish to erect a chapel here, where we can rest. If you will be our servant, we will be yours!" Shortly after, Leicht saw two burning candles descending to this spot. It is alleged that miraculous healings soon began, through the intervention of the fourteen saints.

The Cistercian brothers to whom the land belonged erected a chapel, which immediately attracted pilgrims. An altar was consecrated as early as 1448. Pilgrimages to the Vierzehnheiligen continue to the present day between May and October.

== Depiction in culture ==
One of the group depictions of the fourteen Saints is a 1503 altarpiece by Matthias Grünewald for the monastery in Lichtenfels in Upper Franconia.

The fourteen angels of the lost children's prayer in Engelbert Humperdinck's fairy opera, Hansel and Gretel, symbolize the Fourteen Holy Helpers. The English words are familiar:

When at night I go to sleep,
Fourteen angels watch do keep,
Two my head are guarding,
Two my feet are guiding;
Two upon my right hand,
Two upon my left hand.
Two who warmly cover
Two who o'er me hover,
Two to whom 'tis given
To guide my steps to heaven.

== Gallery ==
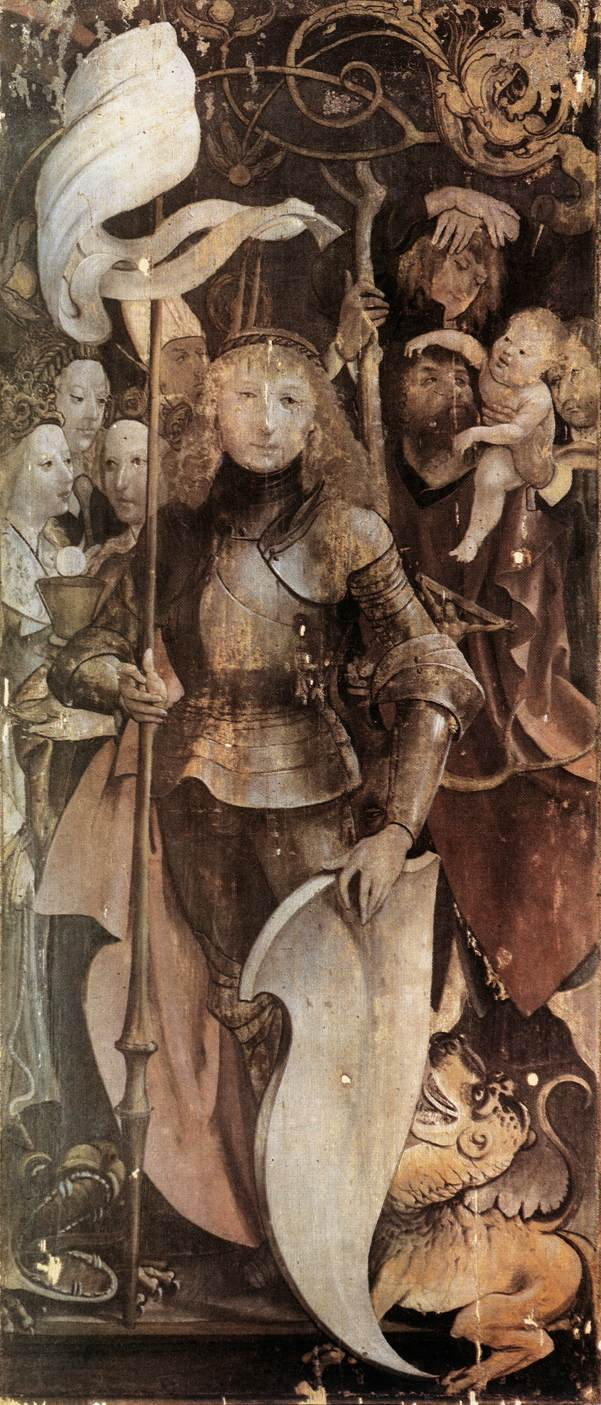
The first panel of the Grünewald altarpiece

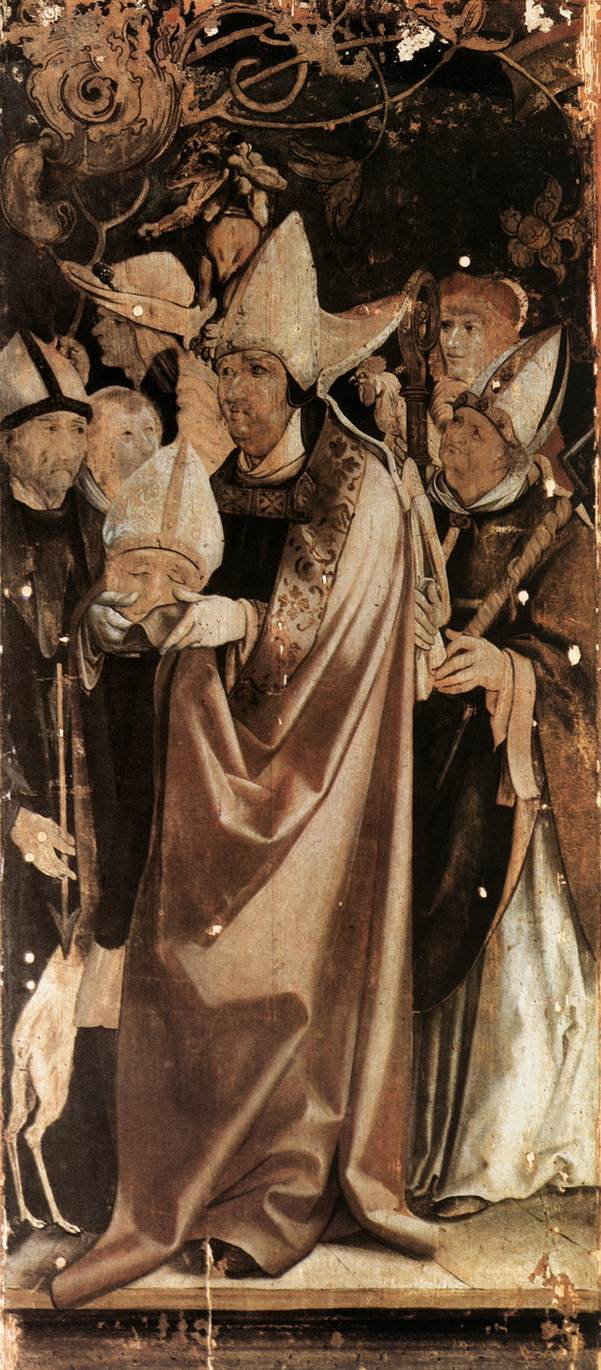
The second panel of the Grünewald altarpiece

== See also ==
- Franciscan Monastery in Kadaň – a Franciscan monastery in the Czech Republic with a church dedicated to the Holy Helpers.
- Langheim Abbey – an abbey in Lichtenfels, Bavaria where Matthias Grünewald painted his "Holy Helpers" altarpiece.
- Patron saints of ailments, illness, and dangers – the category of Roman Catholic saints to which the Holy Helpers belong.
