= Mirwart Castle =

Castle in Saint-Hubert, Belgium

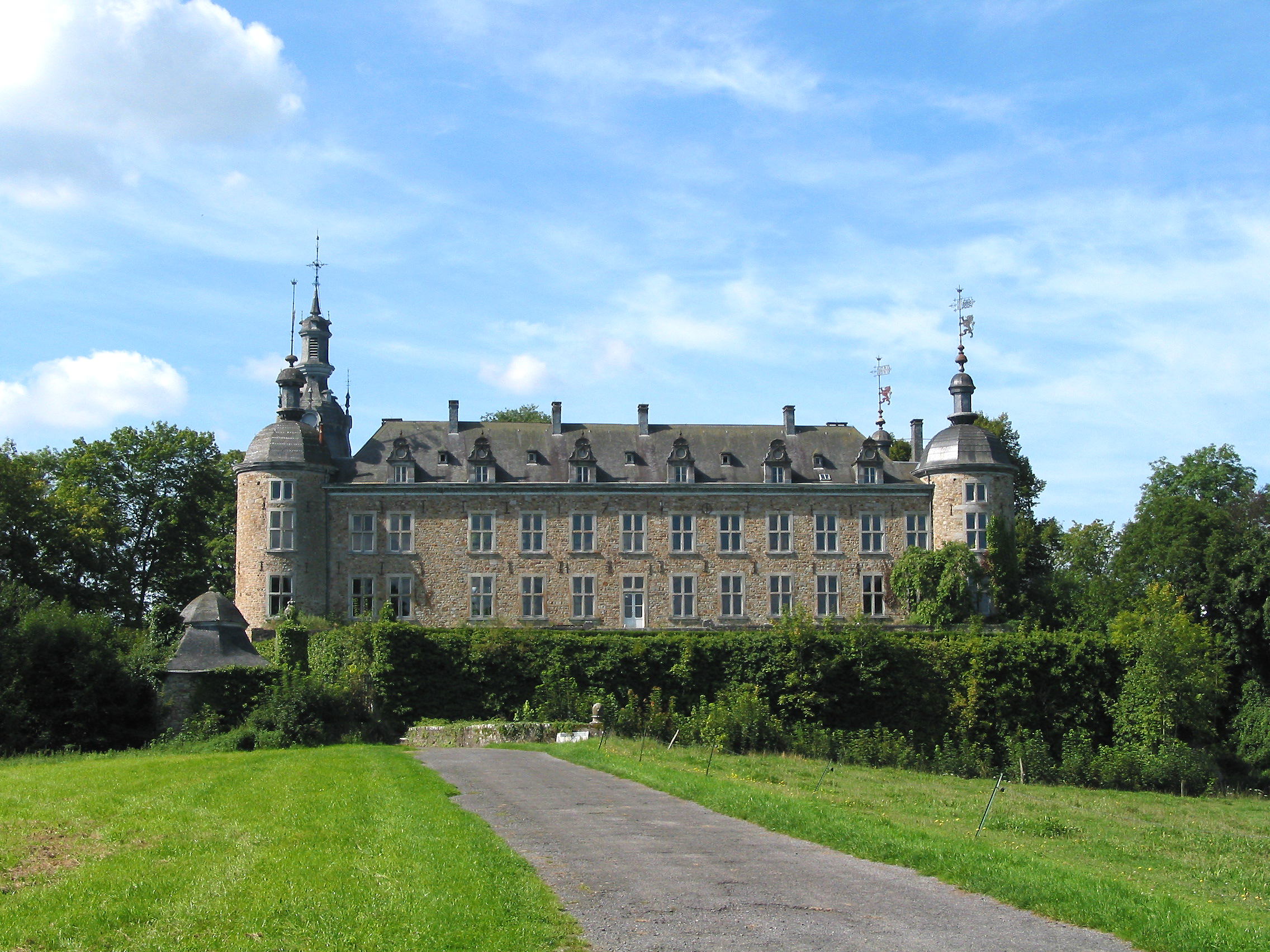
Overall view

Mirwart Castle (French: Château de Mirwart) is situated in Mirwart in Saint-Hubert, in the province of Luxembourg, Wallonia, Belgium.

The castle is built on a rock rising above the "Vallée de la Lomme" (the Valley of the Lomme). The oldest parts of the castle date back to the 11th century. It was a stronghold belonging to the duchy of Lorraine. The lords of Mirwart had many bloody conflicts with other feudal lords of the region, such as the lords of Bouillon and Orchimont.

The lords of Mirwart came into conflict with the monks of the powerful Saint-Hubert Abbey, supported by the Prince-Bishop of Liège, who wanted to extend his power in this region to the disadvantage of the Dukes of Lorraine.

The castle was reinforced, sometime between 1077 and 1082, by Henry of Verdun, bishop of Liege. Following complaints from the abbey of Saint-Hubert, the castle was to be destroyed. This act, however, was not approved by the bishop. In 1099, after regaining control over the fief, Bishop Otbert ordered the reconstruction of the castle, which he granted to Bavon de Waha (also known as Bovo de Duras).

In 1293, against the bishop's wishes, the castle and its estates was acquired by Jean d'Avesnes. This resulted in a conflict between the Prince-Bishop of Liège and his new vassal, who sought support from the Counts of Hainaut, Luxembourg, Namur and Loon, and even from the Dukes of Brabant. Control of the castle changed regularly until it was finally held by Prince-Bishop Adolph II of the Marck.

During the numerous conflicts between Spain, Austria and France in the 17th and 18th centuries, the castle was damaged several times. It was only at the beginning of the 18th century that a long undisturbed period began when extensive renovations and embellishments could be undertaken. During this process the castle gradually lost its strongly fortified character.

At the beginning of the 19th century, the castle was acquired by Aimé-Gabriel d'Artigues, the founder of the famous "Cristallerie de Vonêche", or Vonêche glassworks. Successive proprietors—the families Van der Linden d'Hoogvorst, d'Arrigade and von der Becke—further embellished the castle and turned it into a beautiful country residence. In the middle of the 19th century it was renovated by Alphonse Balat, architect to King Leopold II of Belgium.

After World War II the castle was acquired by the province of Luxembourg. The building was renovated but the province failed to find a use for it. As a result, little by little, the castle was neglected and was subsequently looted by burglars who removed valuable furniture and decorative fittings from the interior.

== See also ==
- List of castles in Belgium

== Sources ==
- Weber, Jean-Pol (dir.), 1992: Mirwart. Château et Alentours. Saint-Hubert, a.s.b.l. Château de Mirwart (publication du Centre Pierre-Joseph Redouté, n^{o} 2)
- Gislebertus (2005). Chronicle of Hainaut. Translated by Napran, Laura. The Boydell Press.
- www.chateaudemirwart.be
