= List of protected heritage sites in Saint-Hubert, Belgium =

This table shows an overview of the protected heritage sites in the Walloon town Saint-Hubert, Belgium. This list is part of Belgium's national heritage.

Object	Year/architect	Town/section	Address	Coordinates	Number^{?}	Image
Basilica of Saint-Hubert, ancient abbey church ^{(nl)} ^{(fr)}		Saint-Hubert		50.026361°N 5.374877°E	84059-CLT-0001-01 Info	Basiliek van Sint-Hubertus, oude abdijkerk More images
Church of Saint-Gilles-au-Pre ^{(nl)} ^{(fr)}		Saint-Hubert	rue Saint-Gilles	50.025528°N 5.370368°E	84059-CLT-0003-01 Info	Kerk Saint-Gilles-au-Pré More images
Buildings and structural parts of the old furnace of Saint-Michel and areas around these buildings ^{(nl)} ^{(fr)}		Saint-Hubert		50.082579°N 5.341835°E	84059-CLT-0004-01 Info	Gebouwen en deelstructuren van de oude oven Saint-Michel en de percelen rond deze gebouwen More images
Building located in the countryside of Arville, old Fenderie ^{(nl)} ^{(fr)}		Saint-Hubert	rue des Ardennes	50.023028°N 5.297377°E	84059-CLT-0005-01 Info	
Mirwart Castle ^{(nl)} ^{(fr)}		Saint-Hubert	rue du Château	50.054611°N 5.257633°E	84059-CLT-0006-01 Info	Kasteel van Mirwart More images
Mill En Haut: buildings and machinery and the ensemble of the various buildings and the environment ^{(nl)} ^{(fr)}		Saint-Hubert	route d'Hatrival	50.015142°N 5.356068°E	84059-CLT-0008-01 Info	
Abbey Complex Saint-Hubert (abbey-palace (interior and exterior), courtyard, fountain from the 19th century facades and roofs of other buildings and the local high school, except the old chapel and the ensemble of buildings with courtyards ^{(nl)} ^{(fr)}		Saint-Hubert		50.026855°N 5.375352°E	84059-CLT-0009-01 Info	Abdijcomplex Saint-Hubert (abdij-paleis (interieur en exterieur), binnenplaats, fontein uit de 19e eeuw, gevels en daken van de andere gebouwen en de lokale middelbare school, behalve de oude kapel en het ensemble van de gebouwen met binnenplaatsen More images
The door (portico tower) of the abbey ensemble ^{(nl)} ^{(fr)}		Saint-Hubert	rue du Parc	50.026881°N 5.376969°E	84059-CLT-0010-01 Info	De deur (portiek toren) van het abdij-ensemble
Altar with the statue of St. Sebastian in the church of Saint-Martin ^{(nl)} ^{(fr)}		Saint-Hubert		50.074317°N 5.306352°E	84059-CLT-0011-01 Info	
De-classification of the interior parts of the first floor of Mirwart Castle and extension of the classification of the outside walls and the ancient remains of the castle terrace overlooking the village ^{(nl)} ^{(fr)}		Saint-Hubert		50.0548°N 5.25816°E	84059-CLT-0012-01 Info	Declassering van de interieurdelen van de eerste etage van het kasteel van Mirwart en uitbreiding van de classificatie met de buitenmuren en de oude resten van het kasteelterras met uitzicht op het dorp More images
Ensemble of the Basilica of Saint-Hubert except for the instrumental part of the organ ^{(nl)} ^{(fr)}		Saint-Hubert		50.026361°N 5.374877°E	84059-PEX-0001-01 Info	Ensemble van de Basiliek van Sint-Hubertus uitgezonderd het instrumentale gedeelte van het orgel More images
Abbey Palace ^{(nl)} ^{(fr)}		Saint-Hubert		50.026574°N 5.373941°E	84059-PEX-0002-01 Info	Abdij-paleis More images

== See also ==
- List of protected heritage sites in Luxembourg (Belgium)
