= Four Holy Marshals =

Four saints venerated in Rhineland

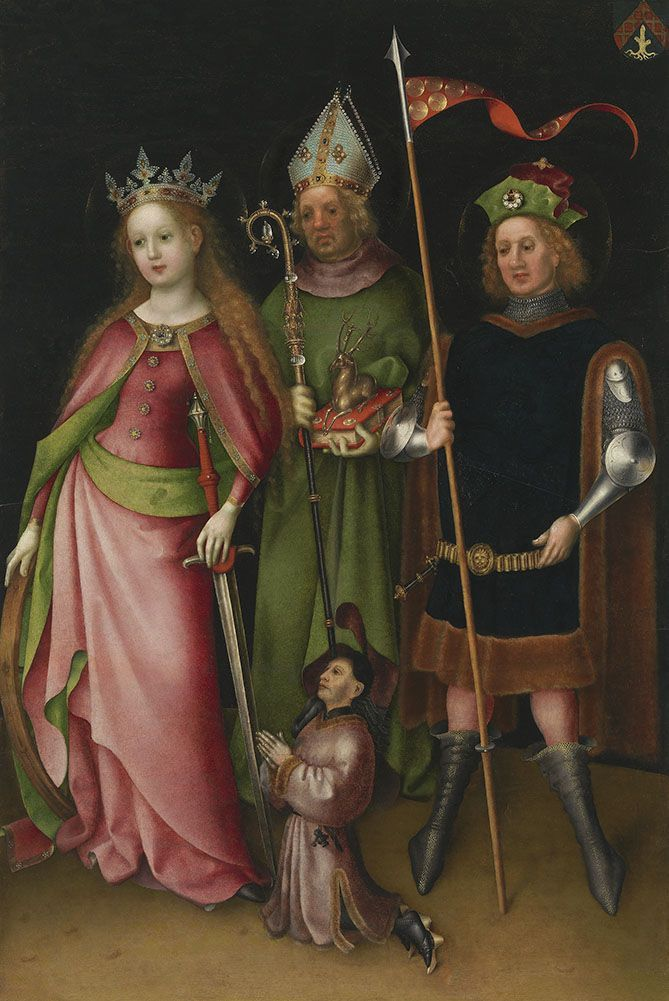
Saint Catherine of Alexandria with two of the Four Holy Marshals: Saint Quirinus (left) and Saint Hubertus (middle). The small kneeling figure is the donor.

The Four Holy Marshals (Vier Marschälle Gottes or just Vier Marschälle) are four saints venerated in the Rhineland, especially at Köln, Lüttich, Aachen, and the Eifel. They are conceived as standing particularly close to throne of God, and thus powerful intercessors. Their joint veneration is comparable to that of the Fourteen Holy Helpers, who are also venerated in the Rhineland.

They are considered “marshals of God” and were invoked against diseases and epidemics during the Middle Ages.

Evidence of this devotion is testified by documentation dating from 1478; however, the joint devotion of these four saints may have existed earlier. The devotion reached its high point in the fifteenth and sixteenth centuries and diminished by the seventeenth. There were churches dedicated to them at Hüngersdorf, Schleiden, and in the Mariwald.

== The Four Holy Marshals ==
The four saints are:

Name (Alternate)	Feast day	Patronage
Quirinus of Neuss (Quirin)	March 30, April 30	Against smallpox and goiter
Hubertus (Hubert)	November 3	Against rabies and dog bites
Cornelius	September 16	Against cramps and epilepsy
Saint Anthony the Great (Antonius, Antony)	January 17	invoked against the plague

In terms of protection over animals, Anthony is the patron of pigs, Cornelius cattle, Hubertus dogs, and Quirinus horses. In addition, each saint has its own particular place of special veneration: Anthony was venerated at Cologne, Hubertus at St-Hubert in the Ardennes, Cornelius at Aachen, and Quirinus at Neuss.

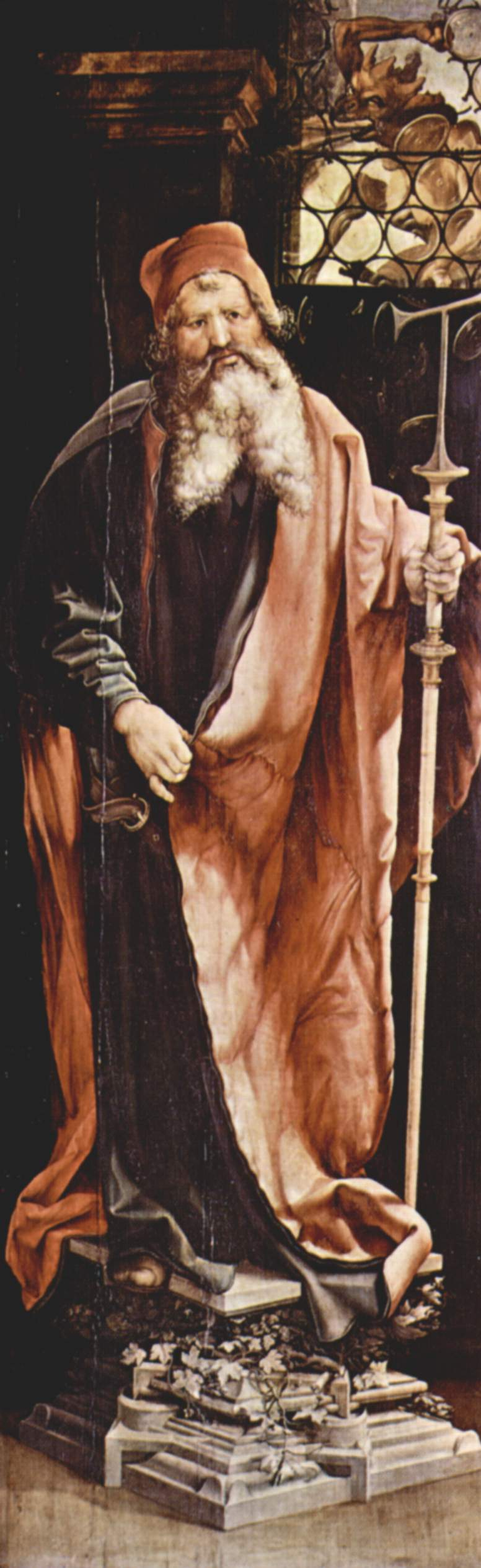
Anthony the Great

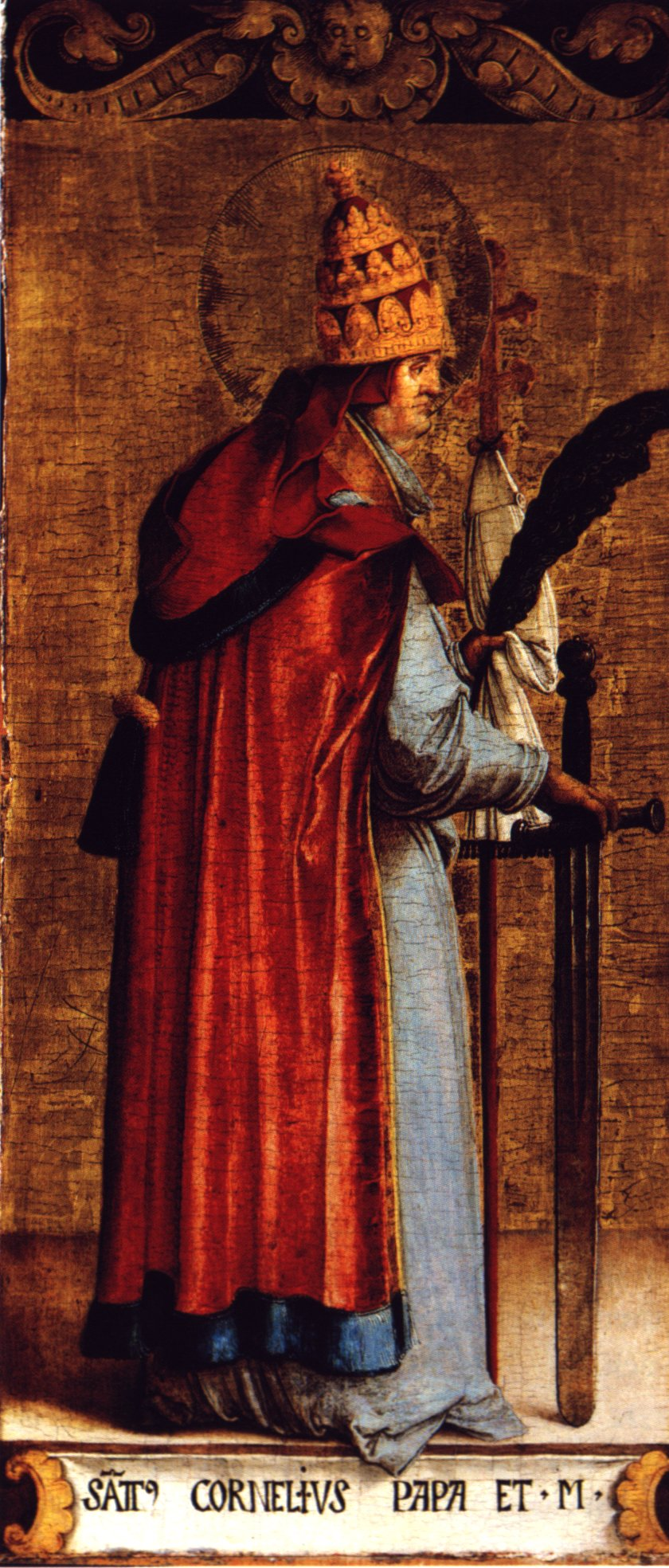
Pope Cornelius

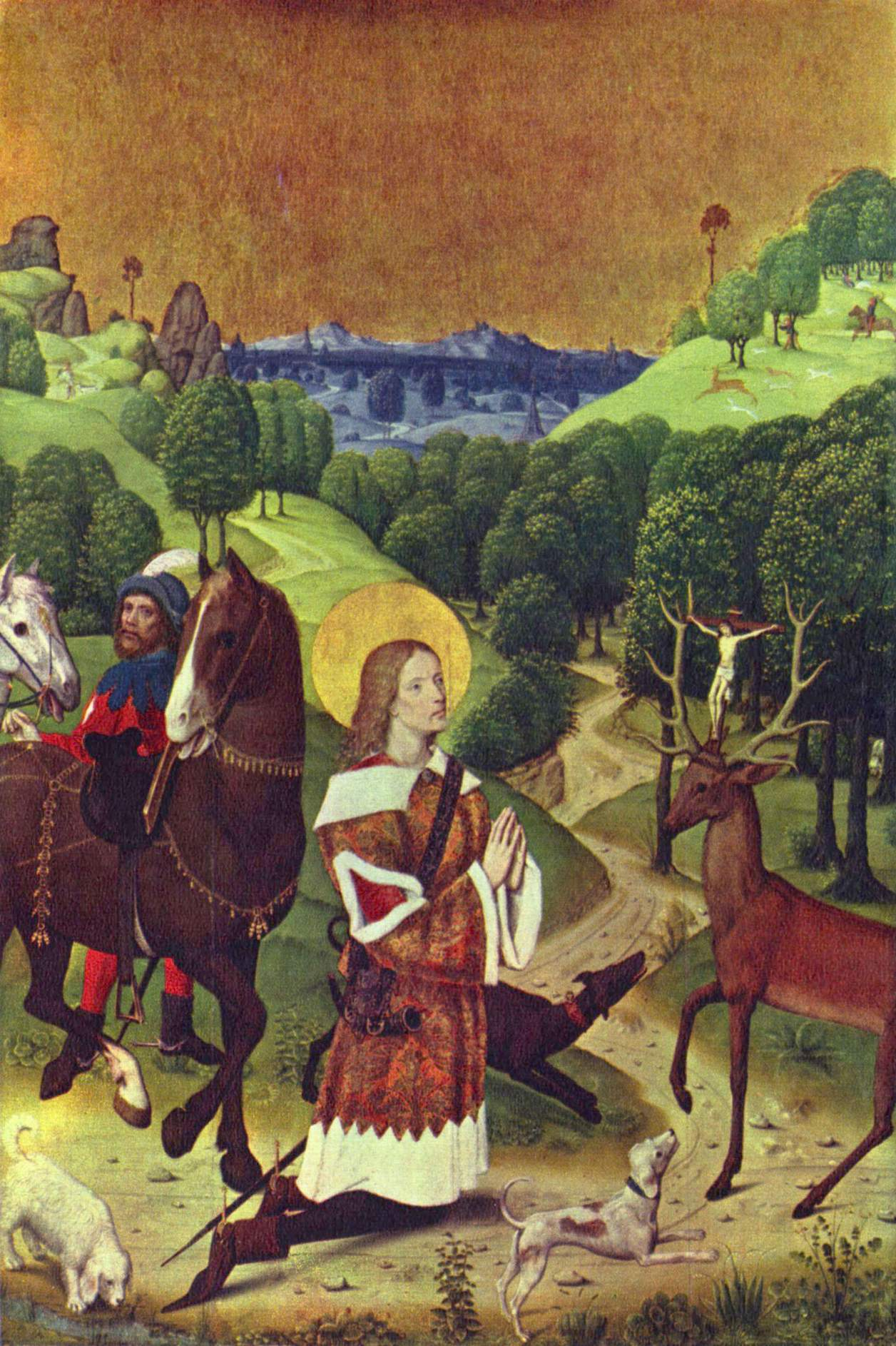
Hubertus

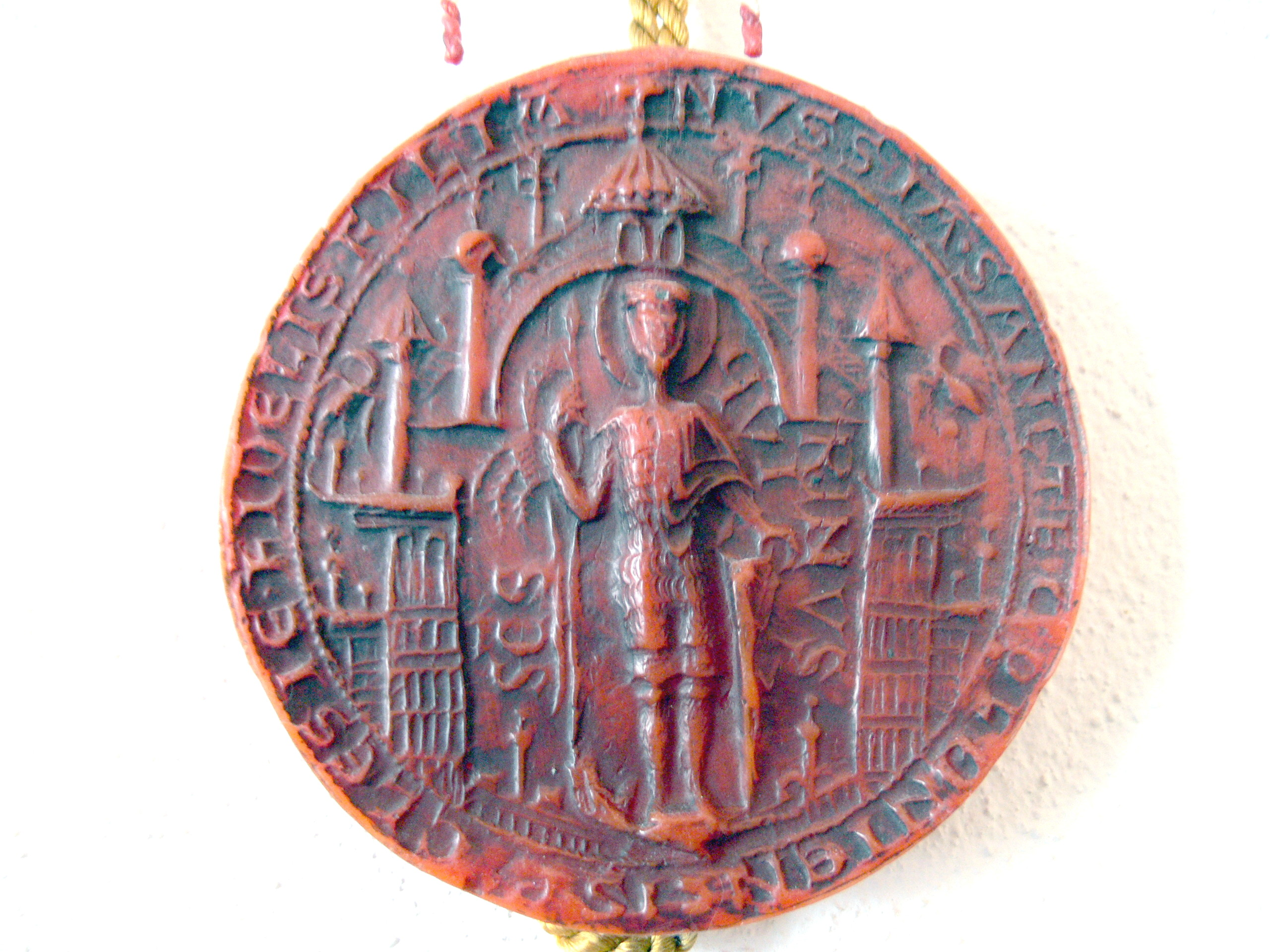
Quirinus

== See also ==
- Fourteen Holy Helpers
- Military saint
