= Karl Hanquet =

Belgian academic historian (1871–1928)

Karl Hanquet (1871–1928) was a Belgian academic historian.

== Life ==
Hanquet was born in Liège on 5 October 1871 to an established family of industrialists and arms manufacturers. He was educated at the Collège Saint-Servais and the University of Liège, where he took a doctorate in philosophy in 1893 and another in law in 1895. He then became a pupil of Godefroid Kurth, obtaining a doctorate in history in 1898 with a thesis on the Chronicle of Saint-Hubert. Awarded a travel bursary, he spent the years 1899–1901 at the University of Berlin.

Hanquet took over Kurth's course on historical method in 1902, and in 1903 was further appointed to teach the courses on Modern Political History and on Institutions of the Middle Ages and the Modern Age. A member of the Society of Saint Vincent de Paul, he was also a social and political activist, adhering to Catholic social teaching and Christian democracy. He died in Liège on 17 January 1928.

== Writings ==
- Étude critique sur la Chronique de Saint-Hubert dite Cantatorium (1900)
- Nouvelles chartes inédites de l'abbaye d'Orval, edited by A. Delescluse and Karl Hanquet (1900)
- Chronique de Saint-Hubert dite Cantatorium, edited by Karl Hanquet (1906)
- Documents relatifs au Grand Schisme: Suppliques de Clément VII (1378-1379) (1924)
- Documents relatifs au Grand Schisme: Lettres de Clément VII (1378-1379), published posthumously, edited by Ursmer Berlière (1930)
