= Floribert of Liège =

Floribert of Liège (died 746) was a bishop of Liège, who is venerated as a saint in the Eastern Orthodox Church and Roman Catholic Church. His feast day is celebrated on 27 April. He was the son of the French-born Hubert of Liège, also a saint, and whom he succeeded on his death as bishop.
