= Saint Hubert's Key =

Sacramental object used to cure rabies

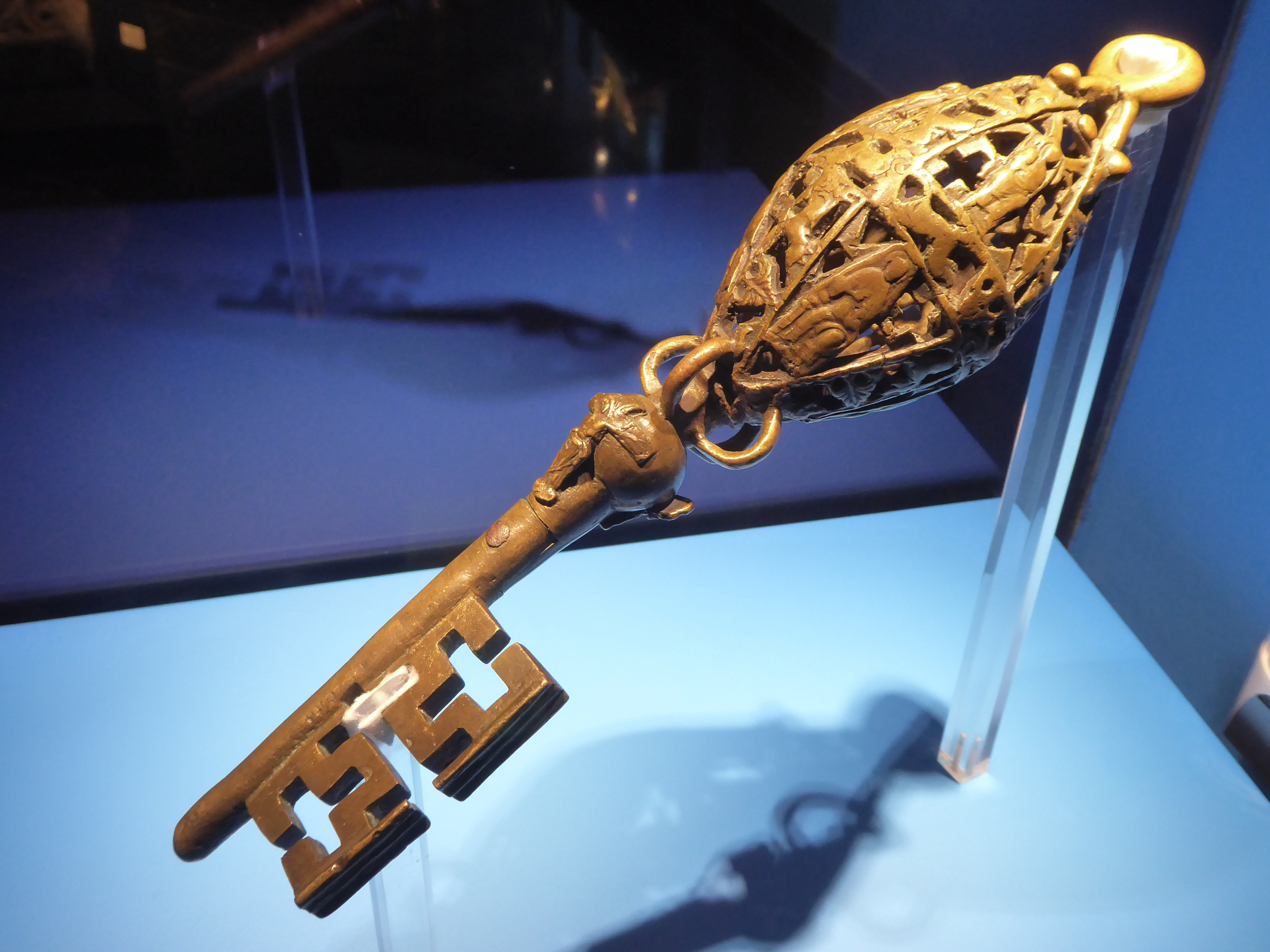
The Key of St. Hubert on display in the Treasury of Liège Cathedral.

St. Hubert’s Key (French: Clef de Saint-Hubert; Dutch: Hubertussleutel) is a sacramental object, typically in the form of a metal nail, cross, or cone. It was primarily used in Western Europe until the early 20th century as a traditional cure for rabies. The key is named after St. Hubert, the patron saint of hunters, mathematicians, opticians, and metalworkers.

== Description ==
The key was heated and pressed onto the area where a person had been bitten by a dog suspected of having rabies. If done soon after the bite, the heat could cauterise and sterilise the wound, potentially eradicating the rabies virus. The practice was endorsed by the Catholic Church (though rarely observed in Orthodox regions), and priests used such keys at places associated with St. Hubert. There, the skin of both humans and animals was branded as protection against rabid dog bites. This practice was recorded in the 1870s in the Ardennes region of France, where dogs were branded with St. Hubert's Key as "a sure preventative of madness".

== Historical significance ==
The file led to the following hypothesis: having first appeared in Liège around the middle of the 12th century, this historic relic might be part of an effort to restore the reputation of the Church of Liège, which had been weakened by the Investiture Controversy. It was not until the mid-13th century that historical sources began to mention the key, as it underwent several transformations during the renovation of the collegiate church of Saint-Pierre de Liège, the original burial place of Saint Hubert. The key is linked to Saint Hubert and his pilgrimage to Rome, which is seen as an "anthropological necessity", providing a retrospective justification for Saint Hubert’s move to Rome and his direct contact with the relics of Saint Peter. The association of Saint Peter with Saint Hubert, and of Peter with the founder of Liège, was crucial for establishing a grand Church: linking the founder of the universal Church with the founder of the local Church.
