= Hubert of Liège =

Christian saint, first bishop of Liège (c.656-727)

Saint Hubert of Liège
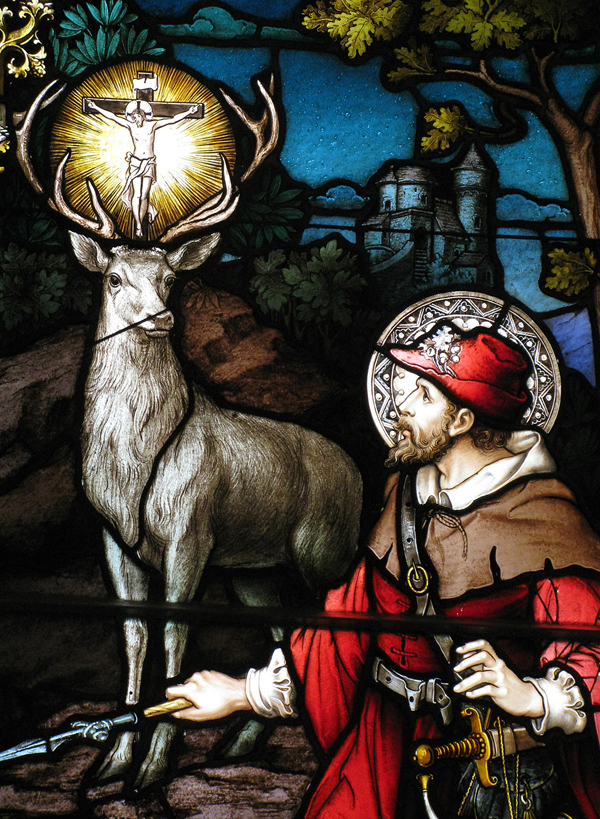
- Saint Hubert (Franz Mayer & Co., St. Patrick's Basilica, Ottawa, Canada)

"Apostle of the Ardennes"
- Born: c. 656–658; Toulouse, Kingdom of the Franks
- Died: 30 May 727; Voeren/Fourons near Liège, Kingdom of the Franks
- Venerated in: Roman Catholic Church; Anglican Church; Eastern Orthodox Church
- Feast: 3 November
- Attributes: gear nearby; knight with a banner showing the stag's head and crucifix; stag; stag with a crucifix over its head; young courtier with two hounds
- Patronage: patron saint of hunters, archers, dogs, forest workers, trappers, mathematicians, opticians and metalworkers

Hubert of Liège (Latinized: Hubertus; c. 656 – 30 May 727) was a Christian saint who became the first bishop of Liège in 708 A.D. He is a patron saint of hunters, mathematicians, opticians and metalworkers. Known as the "Apostle of the Ardennes", he was called upon, until the early 20th century, to cure rabies through the use of the traditional Saint Hubert's Key.

Hubert was widely venerated during the Middle Ages. The iconography of his legend is entangled with the legend of the martyr Saint Eustace. The Bollandists published seven early lives of Hubert (Acta Sanctorum, November 3, 759 – 930 A.D.); the first of these was the work of a contemporary, although it offers few details.

Hubert died 30 May 727 A.D. in or near a place called (in Latin) Fura. In the later Middle Ages, this location was claimed to have been identified as Tervuren near Brussels; recent scholarship, however, considers Voeren (Fourons), a location much closer to Liège than Brussels, to be the saint's likelier resting place. His feast day is 3 November.

== Etymology of "Hubert" ==
Hubert of Liège was a Frank; the Franks were originally a Germanic people. "Hubert" is a Germanic masculine given name, from hug "mind" and beraht "bright".

"Hubertus" is a Latinized form of "Hubert". Other forms of the name include Hugubert, Hughbert, Hugo, Hubrecht, Hugubrecht, Hudson, and Hugh.

== Early life ==
Hubert was born about the year 658, the eldest son of a Frankish duke.. As a youth, Hubert was sent to the Neustrian court of Theuderic III (r. 673–691) at Paris, where his charm and agreeable address led to his investment with the dignity of "count of the palace". Like many nobles of the time, Hubert was a hunting enthusiast.

About this time (682), Hubert married Floribanne, daughter of Dagobert, Count of Leuven. (Their son Floribert of Liège later would succeed his father as Bishop of Liège - in office: 727 to c. 737; bishoprics were all but accounted as fiefs heritable in the great families of the Merovingian kingdoms.) Hubert moved to the Austrasian court where he was warmly welcomed by Pepin of Herstal, Mayor of the palace, who entitled him almost immediately Grand Master of the household.

== Spiritual conversion ==
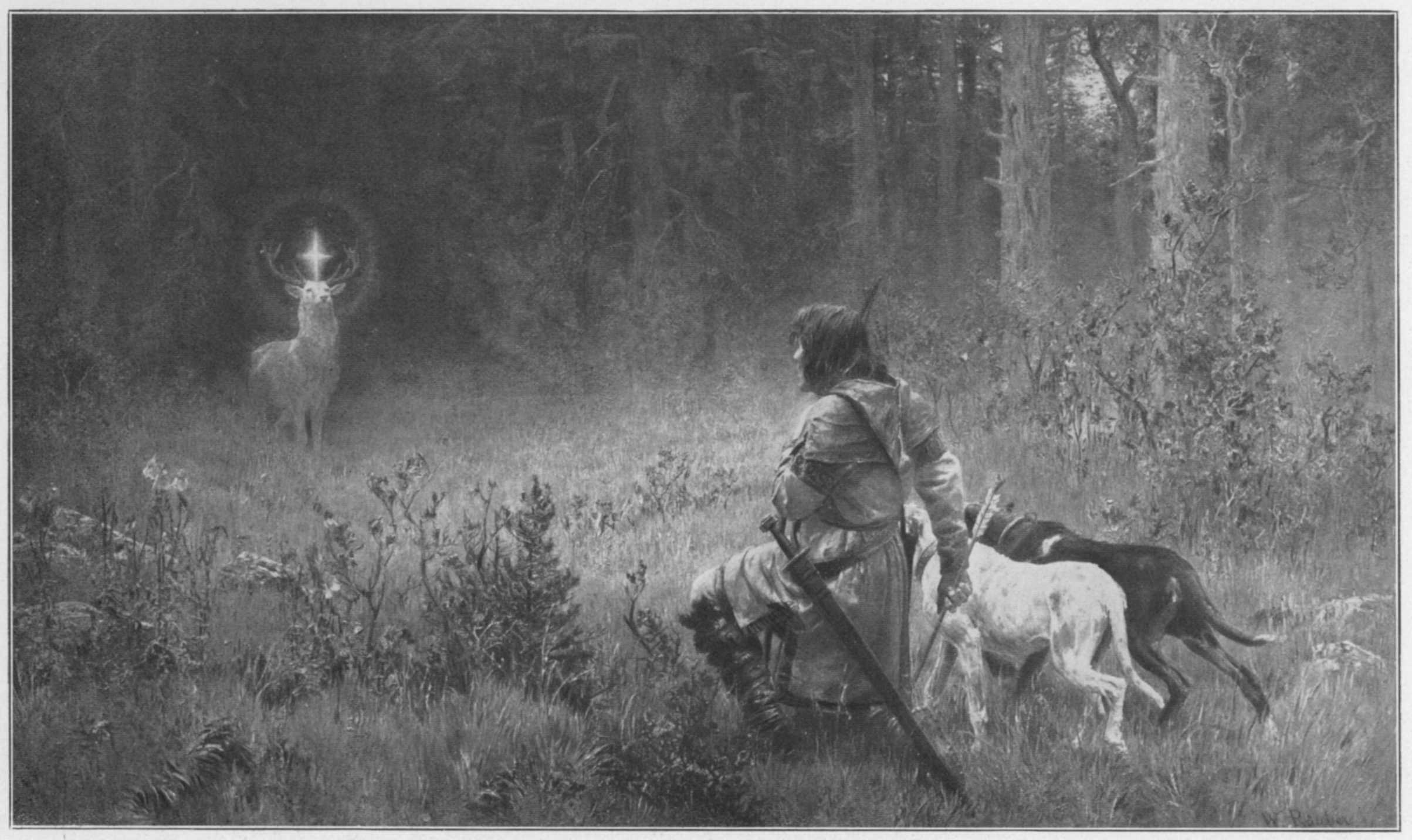
"The Conversion of Holy Hubertus", Wilhelm Räuber (1849–1926)

Hubert's wife died giving birth to their son Floribert, and his grief prompted him to retreat from the court. He withdrew into the forests of the Ardennes and gave himself up entirely to hunting.

Legend holds that on a Good Friday morning, while the faithful were in church, Hubert was hunting in the forest. As he pursued a magnificent stag or hart, the animal turned and Hubert was astounded to see a crucifix floating between its antlers. He heard a voice saying: "Hubert unless thou turnest to the Lord and leadest a holy life, thou shalt quickly go down into Hell." Hubert dismounted and prostrated himself, and after asking "Lord, what wouldst Thou have me do?" is told, "Go and seek Lambert, and he will instruct you."

The story of the stag first appears in one of the later legendary hagiographies (Bibliotheca hagiographic Latina, nos. 3994–4002) and has been appropriated from the legend of Saint Eustace a.k.a. Placidus (Placidus was Eustace's name before he was baptized). The stag story was only attributed to Saint Hubert in the 15th century.

== Religious career ==
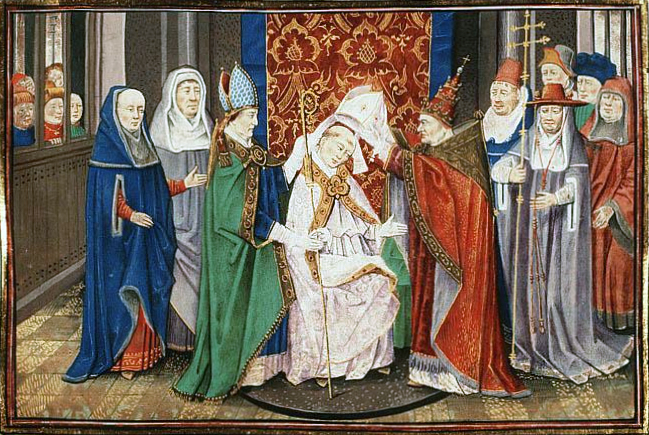
Hubert being consecrated Bishop by Pope Sergius I.

Hubert set out immediately for Maastricht, to meet Lambert, a bishop who received him kindly and became his spiritual director. Hubert renounced all his very considerable honors and gave up his birthright to the Aquitaine to his younger brother, Odo, whom he made guardian of his infant son, Floribert. Having distributed all his personal wealth among the poor, Lambert sent him to the Ardennes to live amongst the people and the forest creatures. Hubert studied for the priesthood, was ordained, and soon afterward became one of Lambert's chief associates in the administration of his diocese. At the request of Lambert, Hubert made a pilgrimage to Rome in 708 in Lambert's name, but during his absence, Lambert was assassinated in Liège by the followers of Pepin. According to the hagiographies of Hubert, this act was simultaneously revealed to the pope in a vision, together with an injunction to appoint Hubert bishop of Maastricht.

Hubert distributed his episcopal revenues among the poor, was diligent in fasting and prayer, and became well known for his eloquence in the pulpit. In 720, in obedience to a vision, Hubert translated St. Lambert's remains from Maastricht to Liège with great pomp and ceremony, with several neighboring bishops assisting. A basilica for the relics was built upon the site of Lambert's martyrdom, and was consecrated as a cathedral the following year, the see being removed from Maastricht to Liège, then only a small village. This laid the foundation of the future greatness of Liège, of which Lambert is honored as patron, and Hubert as founder and first bishop.

Hubert actively evangelized among pagans in the extensive Ardennes forests and in Toxandria, a district stretching from near Tongeren to the confluence of the rivers Waal and the Rhine. He gained the trust (and the faith) of its people through the outdoorsman skills he acquired in his hunting life. He became a sought authority whenever matters of the forest came up.

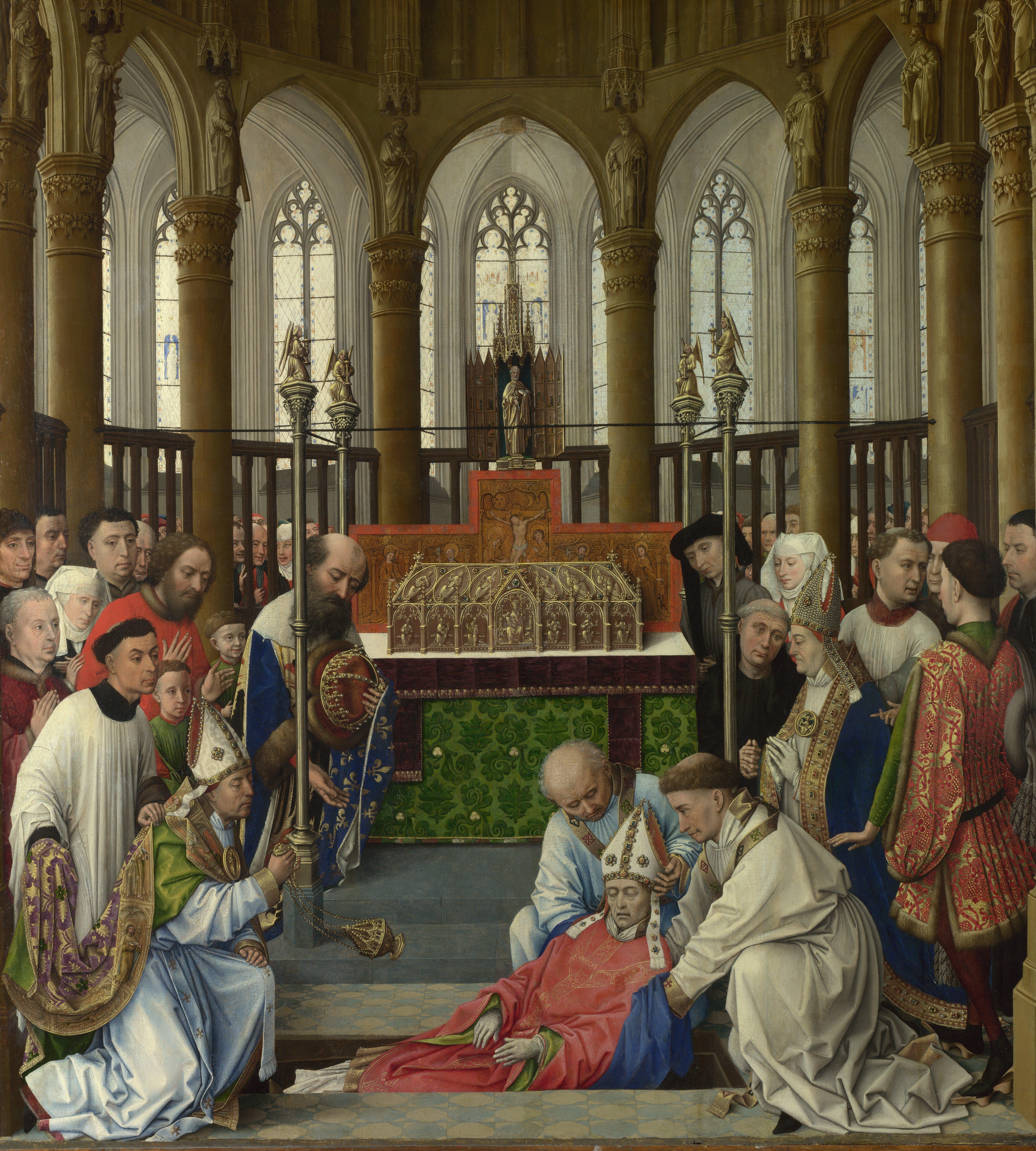
The exhumation of Saint Hubert in the church of Saint Peter at Liège, by Rogier van der Weyden, c. 1437.

== Death ==
Hubert died peacefully in a place called Fura, located 30 miles from Liège, 30 May 727 or 728. Initially he was buried in the collegiate St Peter's Church, Liège, but his bones were transported to the Benedictine Abbey of Amdain in the Ardennes in 825. The abbey became a locus for pilgrimages, until Hubert's coffin disappeared during the Reformation. His feast day is 3 November, probably the date of the translation of his relics to Amdain.

== Veneration ==
Hubert was widely venerated in the Middle Ages and partly because of his noble birth, several military orders were named after him: the Bavarian, the Bohemian International Order of St. Hubertus and that of the Archbishop-Elector of Cologne.

Hubert, along with Quirinus of Neuss, Cornelius and Anthony, was venerated as one of the Four Holy Marshals (Vier Marschälle Gottes) in the Rhineland. The St. Hubertus Orden (Order of Saint Hubert), a chivalric order, was founded in 1444 by Gerhard V of Jülich and Berg.

In the Anglican Communion, at least two churches have been dedicated to Saint Hubert within the Church of England.

The St. Hubert's Mass is a form of church service with instrumental accompaniment, mainly involving horns. It takes place annually in memory of St. Hubert of Liège around November 3, St. Hubert's Day.

=== Patronage ===
St. Hubert of Liège is a patron saint of archers; dogs; forest workers; trappers; hunting and huntsmen; opticians; mathematicians; metal workers; smelters and the city of Liège. St. Hubert is also attributed as the patron saint of French Horn players.

St. Hubert has been described as the patron saint of hunters and is honored by sportsmen as the originator of ethical hunting behavior. However, he renounced hunting after having his vision of encountering the stag, as it was believed that God had seen his hunting life as an unholy, sacrilegious one which would lead him to Hell. When Hubert became a priest, clergy were subsequently forbidden to hunt and if they did, would be required to do penance.

== Legacy ==
Hubert is honored among sport hunters as the originator of ethical hunting behavior. In some versions of the story, the stag is said to have lectured Hubert to hold animals in higher regard and have compassion for them as God's creatures with value in their own right. For example, the hunter ought to only shoot when a clean, quick, and therefore humane kill is assured. He ought to shoot only old stags which are past their prime breeding years and forego a much-anticipated shot on a trophy to instead euthanize a sick or injured animal that might appear on the scene. Further, one ought never to shoot a female with young in tow, to assure the young deer have a mother to guide them to food during the winter. Such is the legacy of Hubert, which is still taught today and who is held in high regard in the extensive, rigorous German and Austrian hunter education courses.

His legacy is also followed by the French chasse à courre (hunting with hounds) masters, huntsmen, and followers who hunt deer, boar, and roe on horseback and are the last direct heirs of Hubert in Europe. Chasse à courre is currently enjoying a revival in France. These hunters apply a specific set of ethics, rituals, rules, and tactics that date from the early Middle Ages. Hubert is venerated every year by the hunts in formal ceremonies.

In Belgium, the feast day of St Hubert (Fête de la Saint-Hubert, in French) is marked by blessings of horses, dogs, and other animals, not necessarily those involved with hunts.

The St. Hubert Club of Great Britain is dedicated to responsible deer management.

The St. Hubertus Club Chicago is a German cultural organization that promotes German heritage and hunting in the German tradition.

The Svätý Anton manor house, which houses a Forestry, Wood and Hunting Museum, hosts a festival, St. Hubertus Days each September in Svätý Anton, Slovakia.

The southernmost hamlet within the town of Keene, New York, is "St. Huberts".

Other institutions named after St. Hubert include St. Hubert Catholic School (Chanhassen, Minnesota), St. Hubert Catholic School (Hoffman Estates, Illinois), St Hubert Catholic High School For Girls (Philadelphia), St. Hubert School, (Calgary, Alberta, Canada), Saint-Hubert Flying College (Saint-Hubert, Quebec), Collège St-Hubert (Auderghem, Belgium), Our Lady & St. Hubert's Catholic Primary School (Dudley, England), Rôtisserie St Hubert (Quebec, Canada).

Catholic Concern for Animals confers awards annually to honor exceptional individuals who have made outstanding contributions towards advancing animal welfare and status in human society. In particular, their "St Hubert Award" recognizes persons who have given up activities that exploit animals to become examples of compassionate living.

== Gallery ==
Saint Hubertus Deer, the coat of arms of the municipality of Hollola, Finland

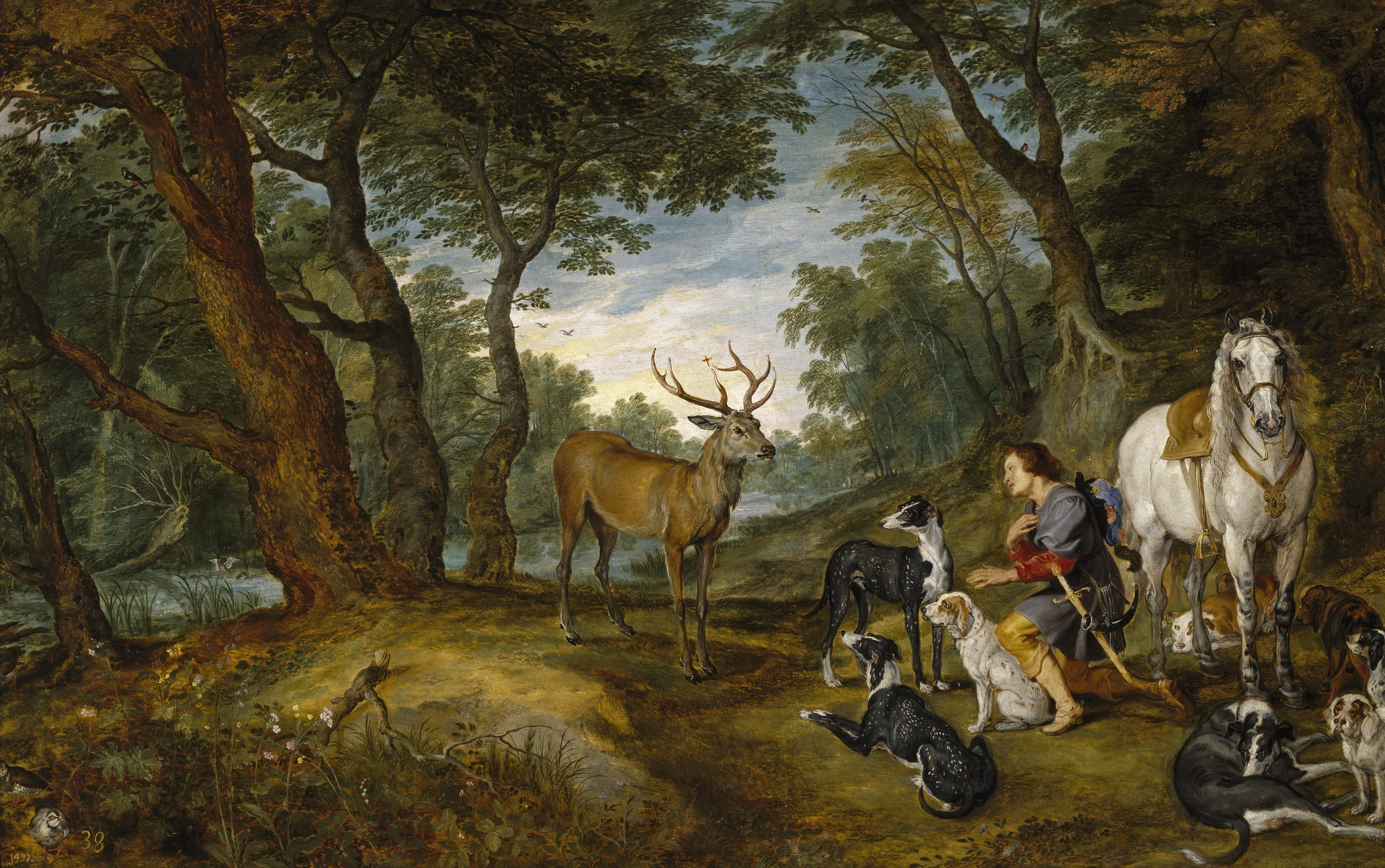
The Vision of Saint Hubert (c. 1617) by J. Brueghel and P. P. Rubens, Prado museum, Madrid.

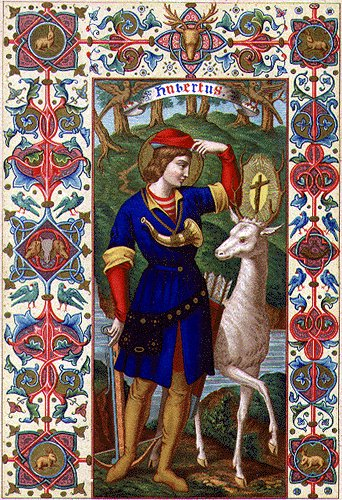
A print in the style of an illuminated manuscript showing Hubert of Liège with the stag.

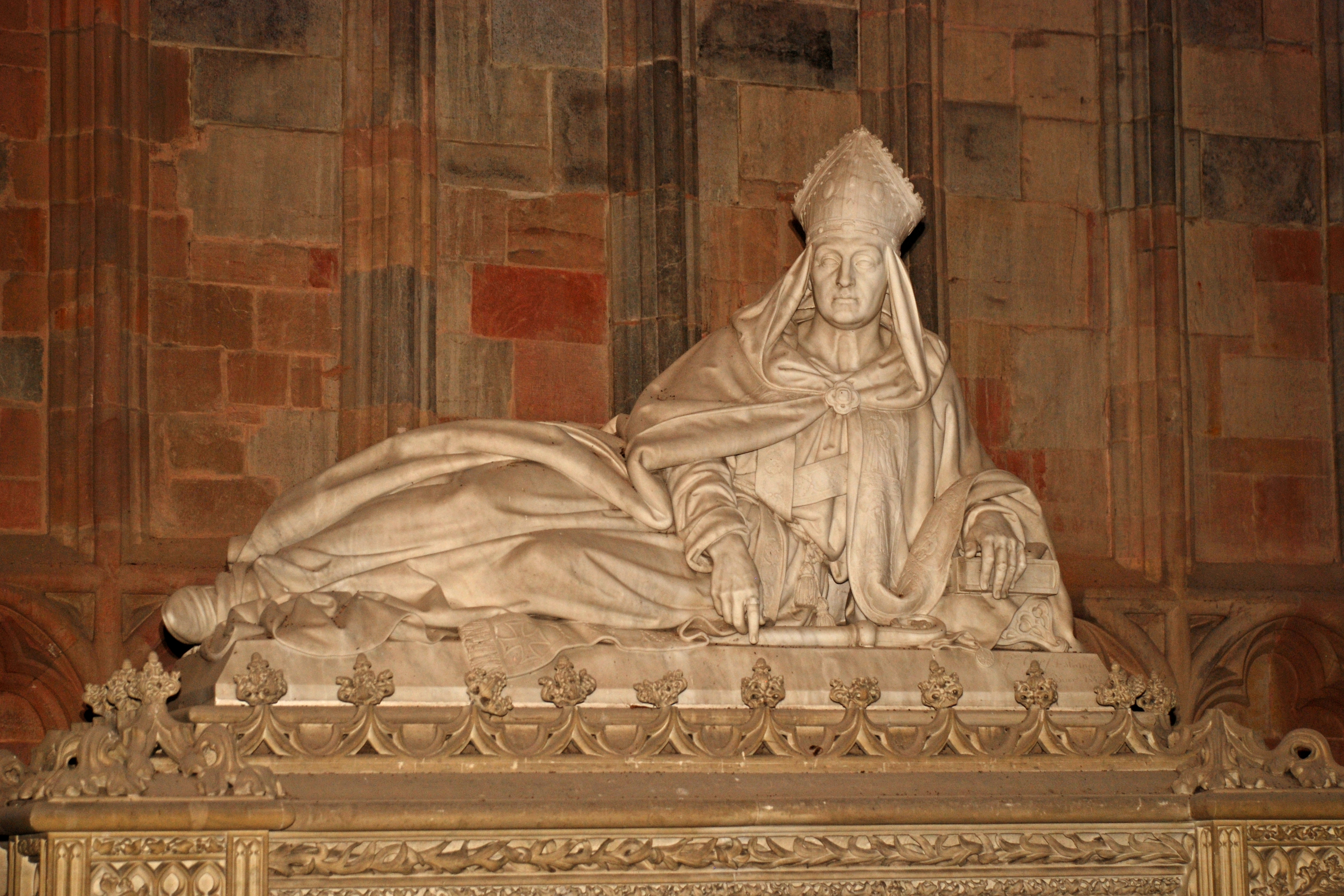
Cenotaph of Hubertus in the basilica of Saint-Hubert (1847)

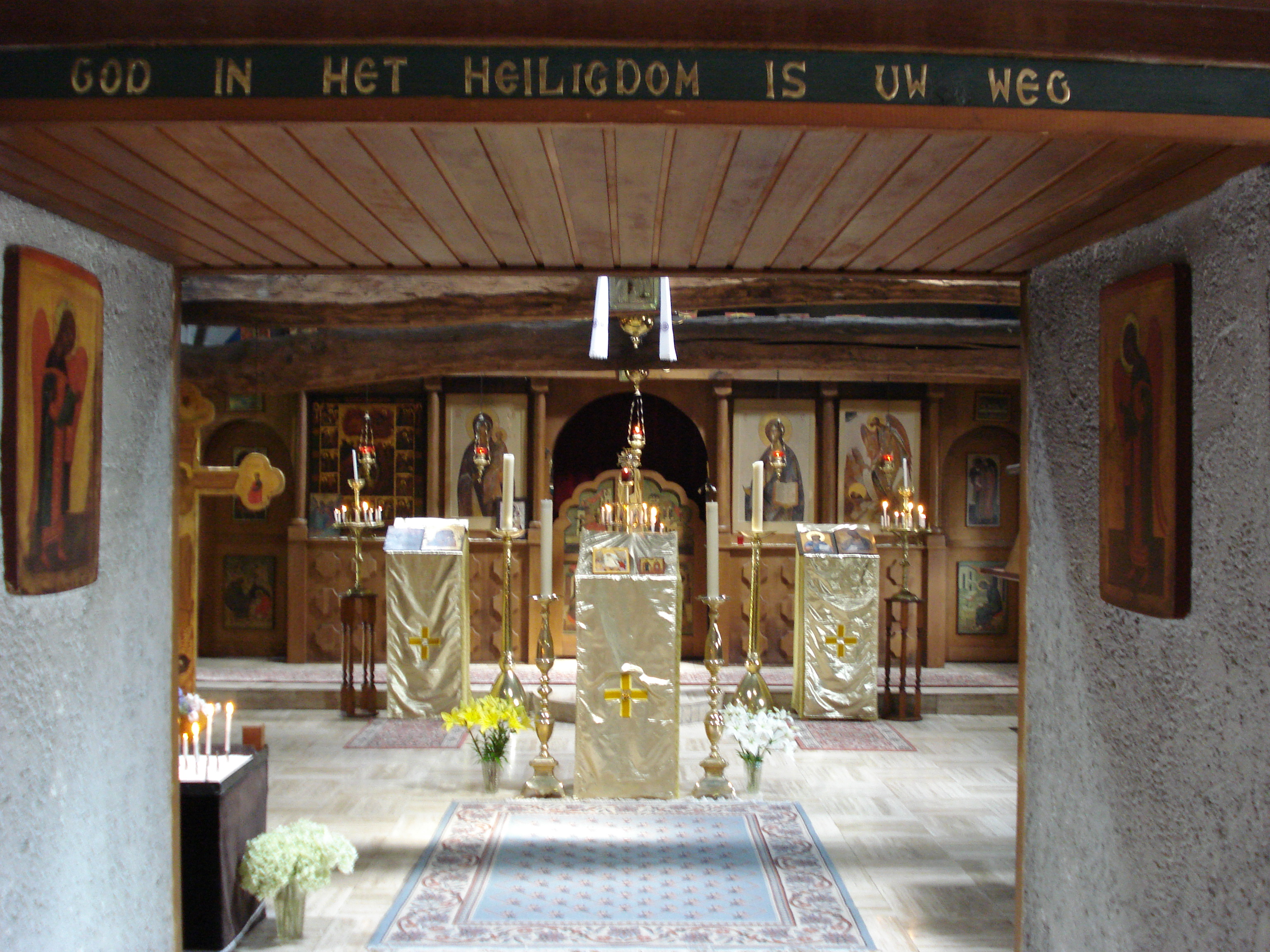
Russian Orthodox church and monastery, interior in Sint Hubert, Netherlands

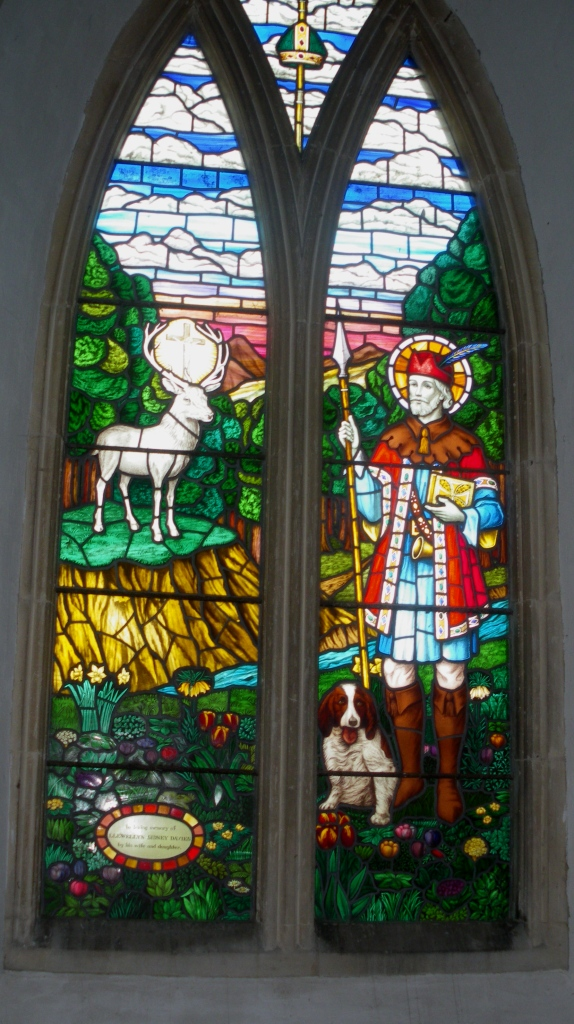
Stained glass window in St. Ethelbert's Church, Herringswell, Suffolk, England. Depicts St Hubert and the deer.

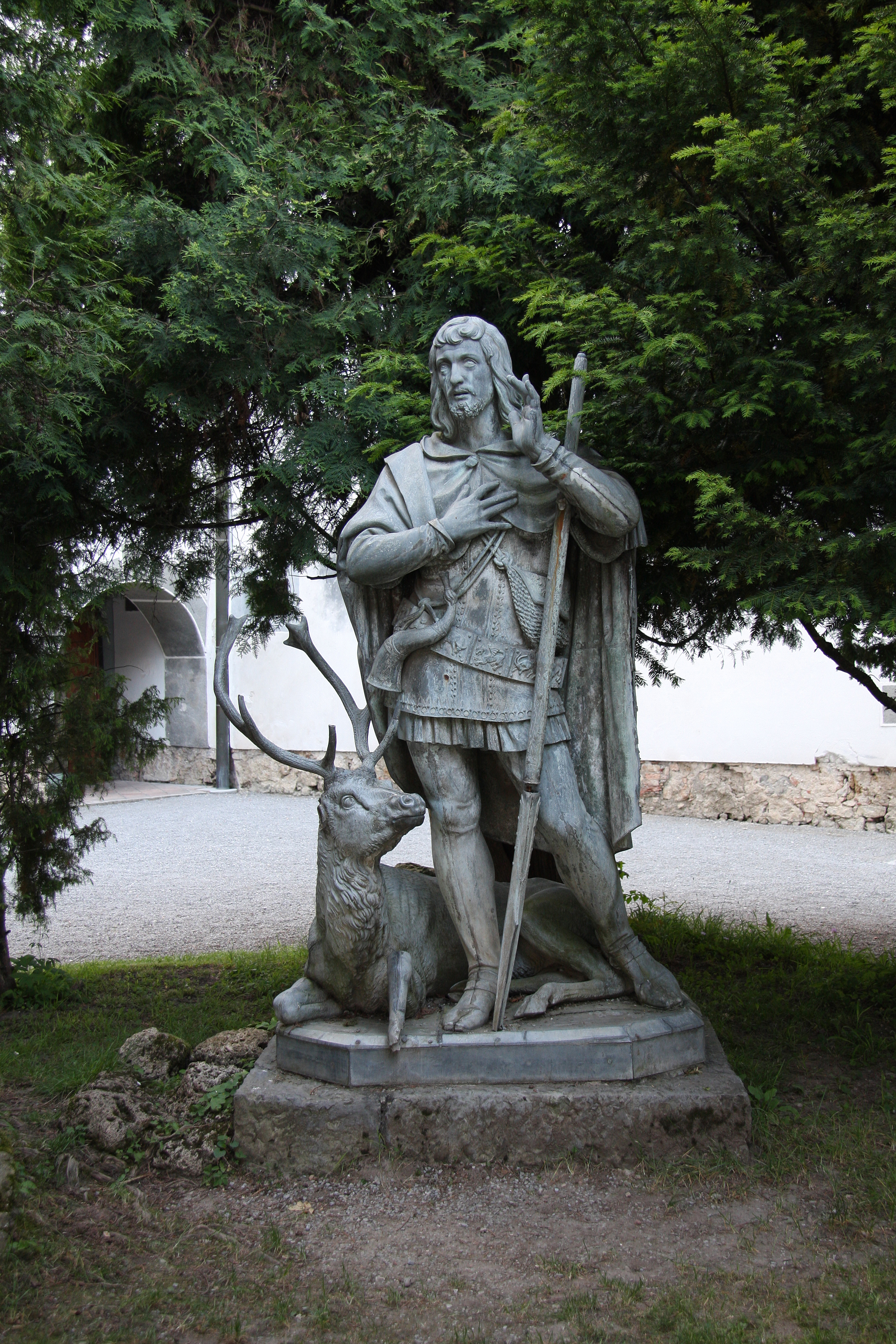
A zinc statue of Saint Hubert and a deer outside Bistra Castle in Slovenia

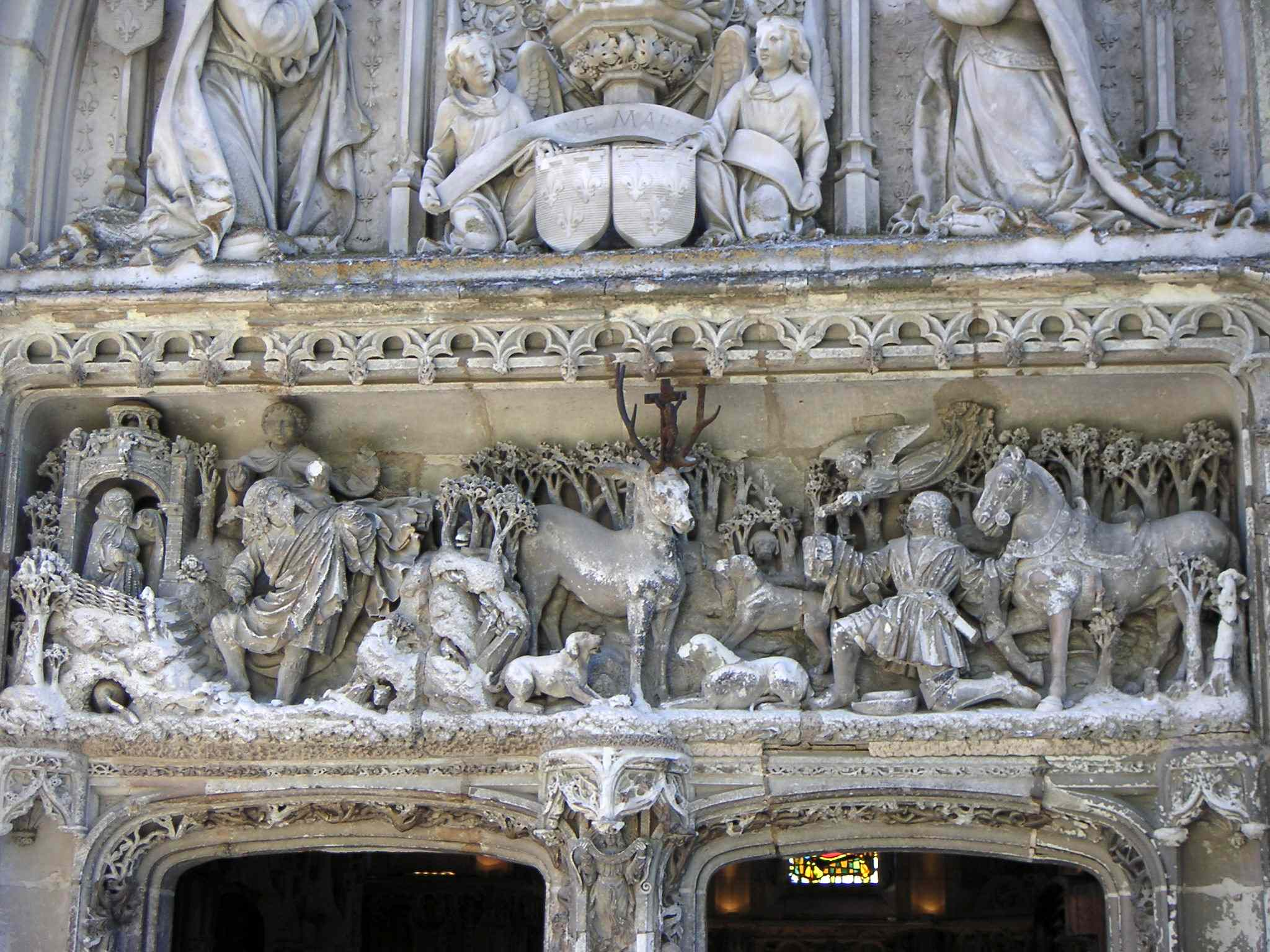
Depiction of the miracle of the stag in the Chapel of Saint Hubert at Château d'Amboise, France.

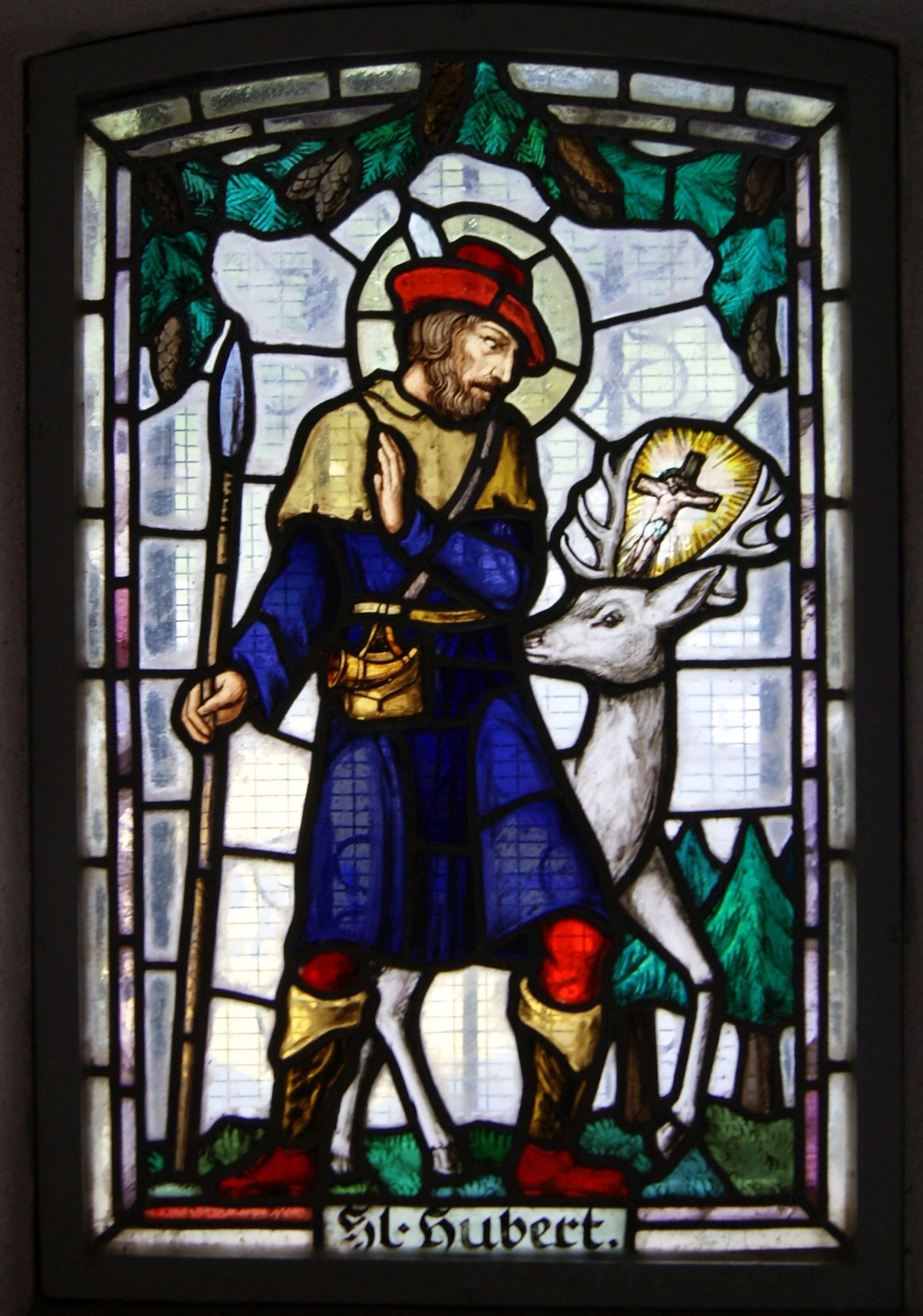
Glass window with St. Hubert from Vorarlberg, Austria.

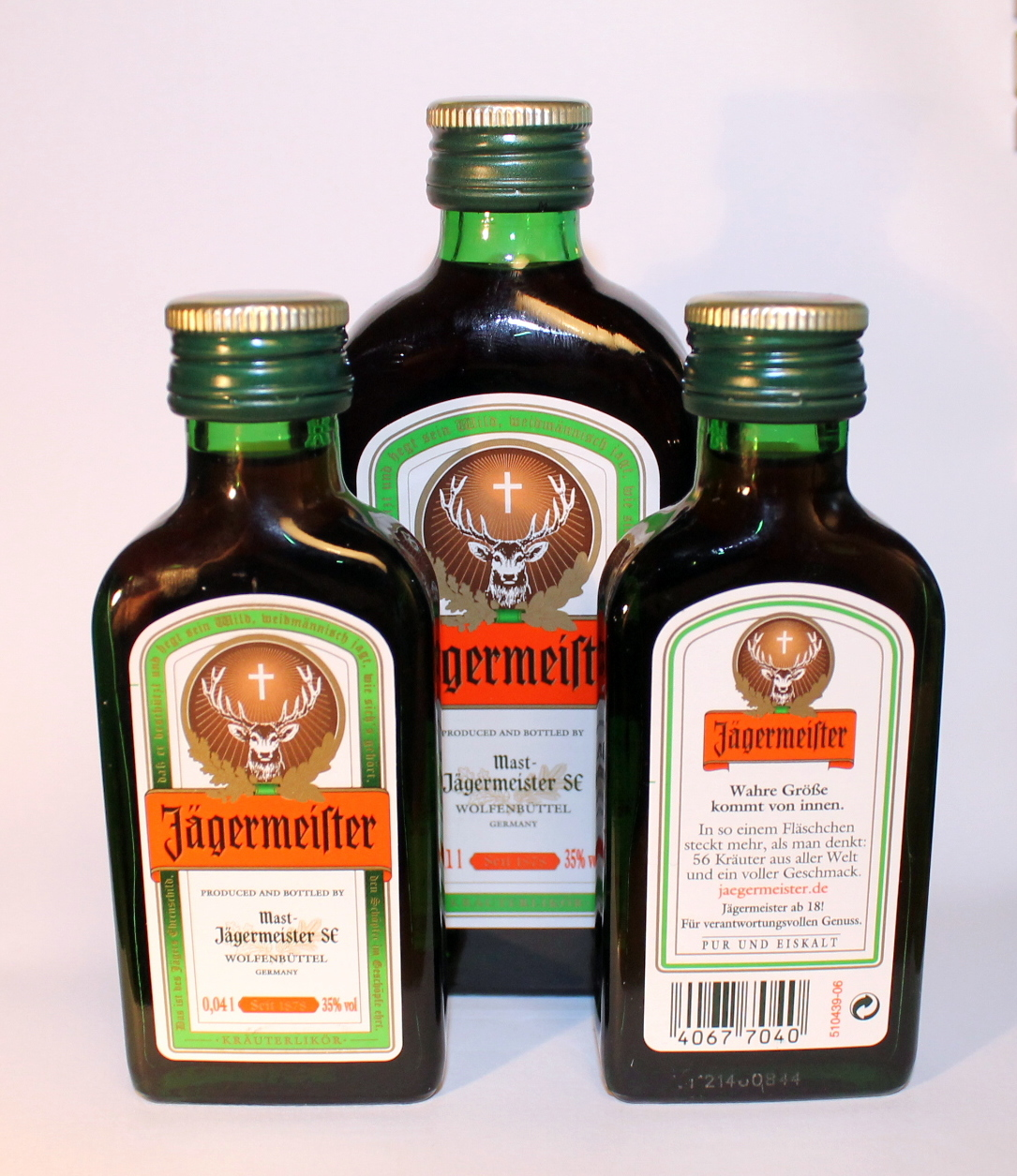
St. Hubert's stag is the logo of Jägermeister ("Master Hunter") liqueur.

Saint Hubert's Deer, the coat of arms of the city of Grodno, Belarus
