= Abbey of Saint-Hubert =

Benedictine monastery in Belgium

Abbey of St Peter in the Ardennes
- Abbaye de St-Pierre en Ardennes
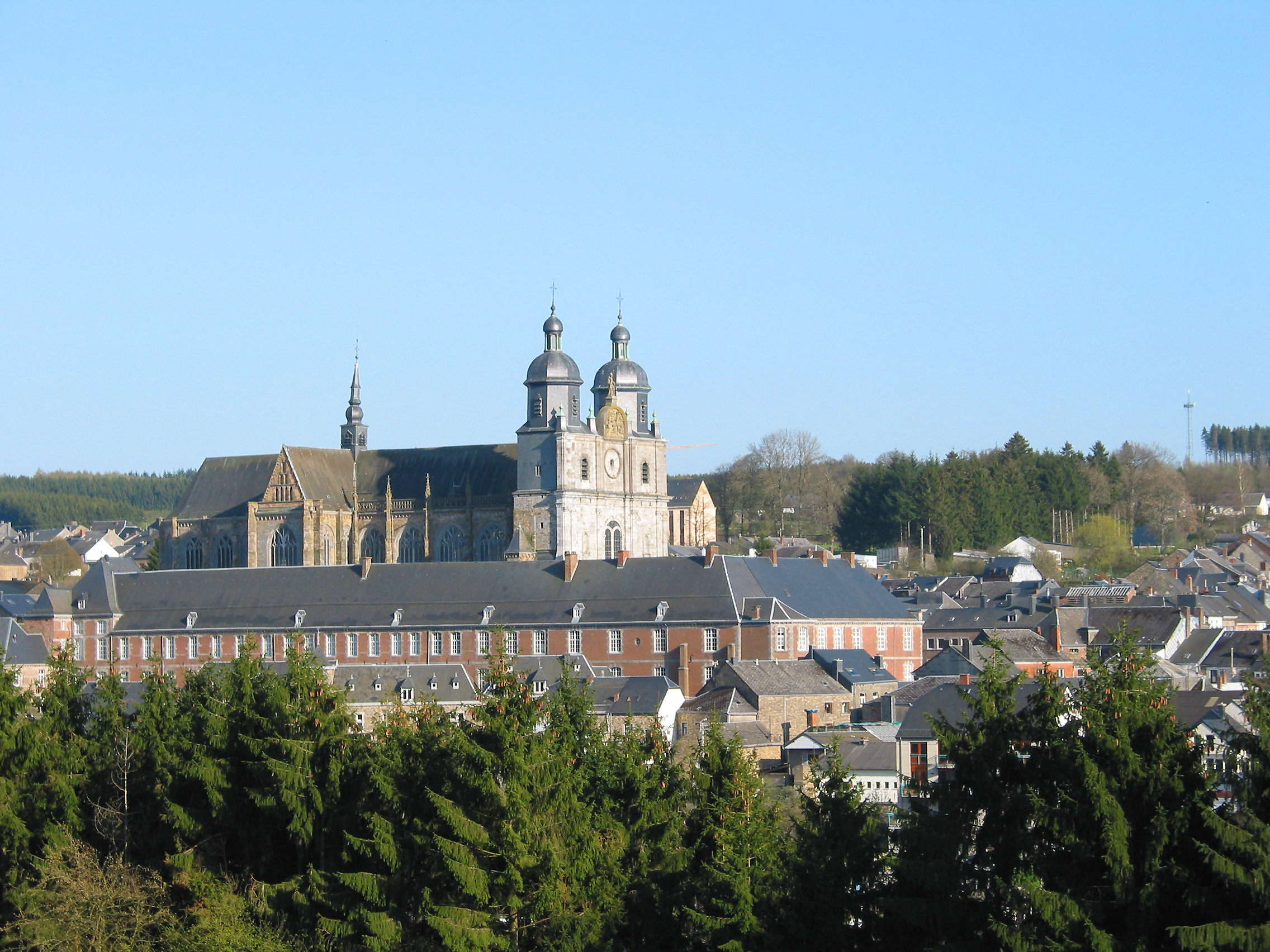
- Interactive map of Abbey of St Peter in the Ardennes

Monastery information
- Order: Order of St Benedict
- Established: 687
- Disestablished: 1797
- Diocese: Liège

Site
- Coordinates: 50.0265°N 5.3744°E

Saint-Hubert Abbey (French: Abbaye de Saint-Hubert), officially the Abbey of St Peter in the Ardennes (Abbaye de Saint-Pierre en Ardennes), was a Benedictine monastery founded in the Ardennes in 687 and suppressed in 1797. The former abbey church is now a minor basilica in the diocese of Namur, Belgium. It was listed as built heritage in 1938, and as an exceptional monument in 2016.

== History ==
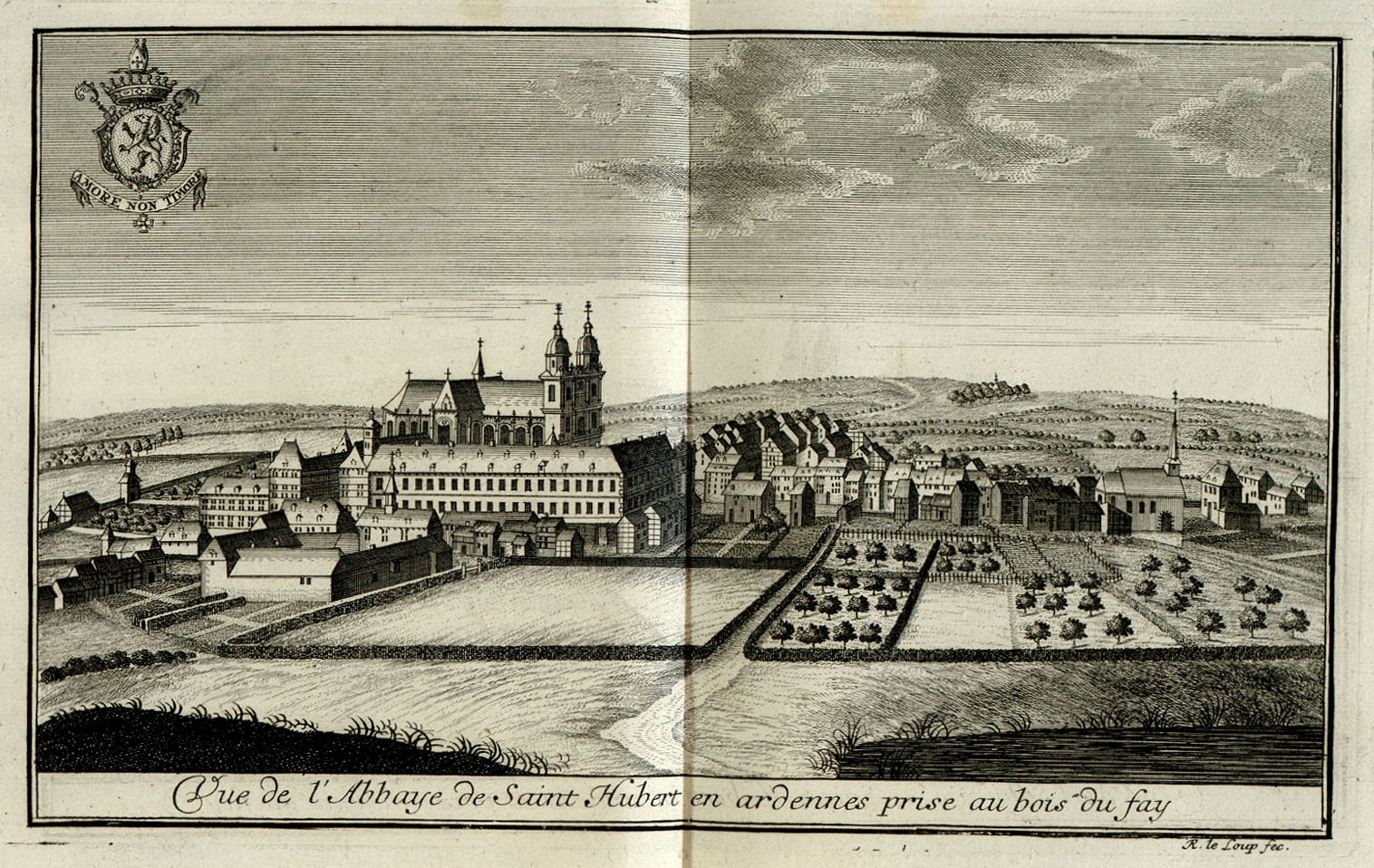
An 18th-century view of Saint-Hubert

The monastery was founded in the village of Andage in 687 by Pepin of Herstal and his wife, Plectrude, for the monk Bergis. It was dedicated to St Peter.

The remains of Saint Hubert of Liège (died 727) were installed in the monastery on 30 September 825. Both the abbey and the town would as a result come to be generally known as "Saint-Hubert".

Because of St Hubert's status as patron saint of hunting, the Abbey was a noted centre of hound breeding and today's bloodhound is believed to be descended from the hounds bred there.

There were serious fires in the monastery in 1130, 1261, and 1525, and the building was sacked by Calvinists in 1568. The final suppression of the monastery took place in 1797.

== Chronicle ==
The monastery's chronicle, known as the Cantatorium of Saint-Hubert from the music book in which it was originally recorded, was published in 1906 in an edition by Karl Hanquet. Originally composed in the years around 1100, it is a major source for the history of the investiture controversy in the diocese of Liège.
