= Quirinus of Neuss =

2nd century Roman martyr and German saint

Saint Quirinus of Neuss
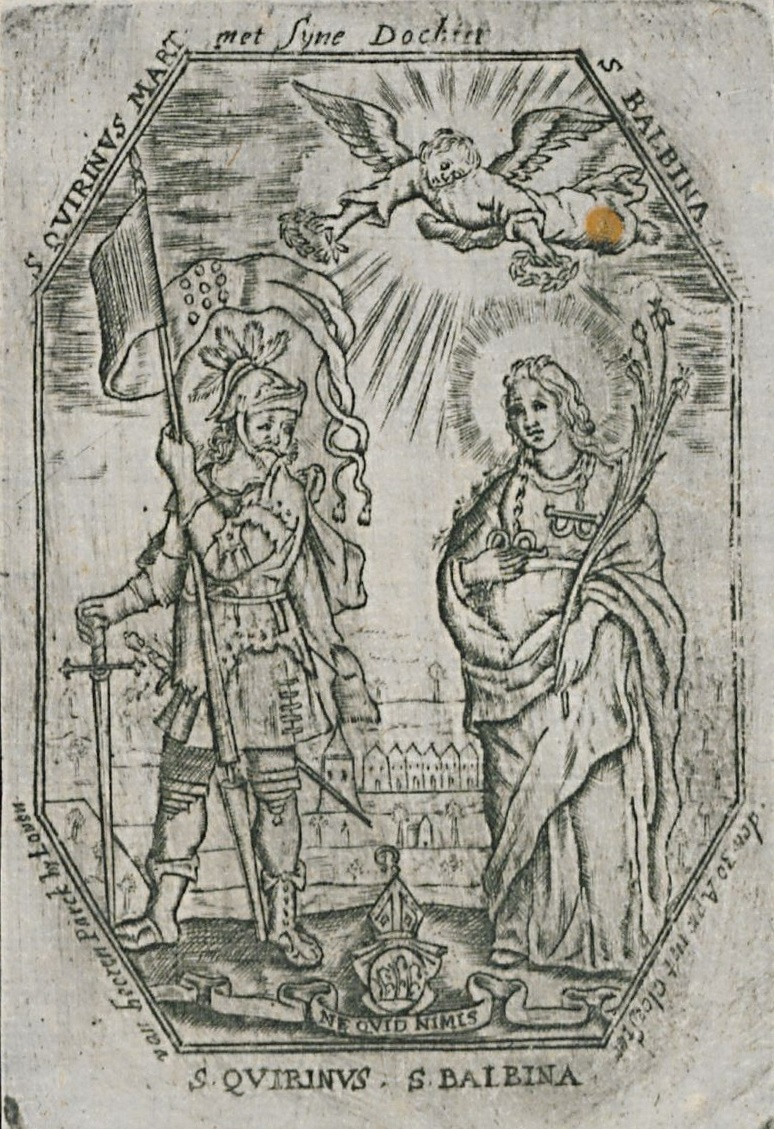
- Saint Quirinus and Saint Balbina
- Died: 30 March 116; Rome, Italy
- Venerated in: Catholic Church; Eastern Orthodox Church
- Major shrine: Neuss
- Feast: April 30
- Attributes: military attire; knight with lance, sword, hawk; banner or sign with nine balls
- Patronage: Neuss; Correggio, Italy; invoked against the bubonic plague, smallpox, and gout; afflictions associated with the legs, feet, ears; paralysis; ulcers; Goiter; skin conditions; diseases affecting cattle and horses; patron saint of animals; patron saint of knights, soldiers, and horsemen

Quirinus of Neuss (German: Quirin, Quirinus), sometimes called Quirinus of Rome (which is the name shared by another martyr) is venerated as a martyr and saint of the Catholic Church and Eastern Orthodox Church. His cultus was centred at Neuss in Germany, even though he was a Roman martyr.

According to the Catholic Encyclopedia, a Roman martyr named Quirinus was buried in the Catacomb of Prætextatus on the Via Appia. The Martyrologium Hieronymianum (ed. De Rossi-Duchesne, 52) mentions Quirinus' name and place of burial. The Itineraries to the graves of the Roman martyrs (Giovanni Battista De Rossi, "Roma sotterranea", I, 180–1) also mention these two pieces of information.

The Martyrologium Hieronymianum assigns him under the feast day of April 30, the date that appears in the catalogue of Roman martyrs of the 4th century.

== Legend ==
Quirinus is introduced into the legendary Acts of Sts. Pope Alexander I and Balbina, where it is said he was a tribune (Dufourcq, loc. cit., 175). He is said to have been decapitated in 116. Legends make him a Roman tribune who was ordered with executing Alexander, Eventius, and Theodolus, who had been arrested by order of Trajan. However, after witnessing miracles performed by these three saints, Quirinus converted to Christianity and was baptised by Alexander, as also was his daughter Balbina.

Quirinus was condemned to have his tongue, hands and feet cut off. According to the popular legend, which is often represented in art, his tongue was offered to a falcon, but the bird refused to eat it: the Acts say nothing of it. The hands and feet were in like manner cast to dogs, and popular tradition adds that they refused to devour them. Afterwards he was drawn by oxen to the place of final execution where he was decapitated. He is believed to have been buried in the catacomb of Prætextatus on the Via Appia.

== Veneration ==
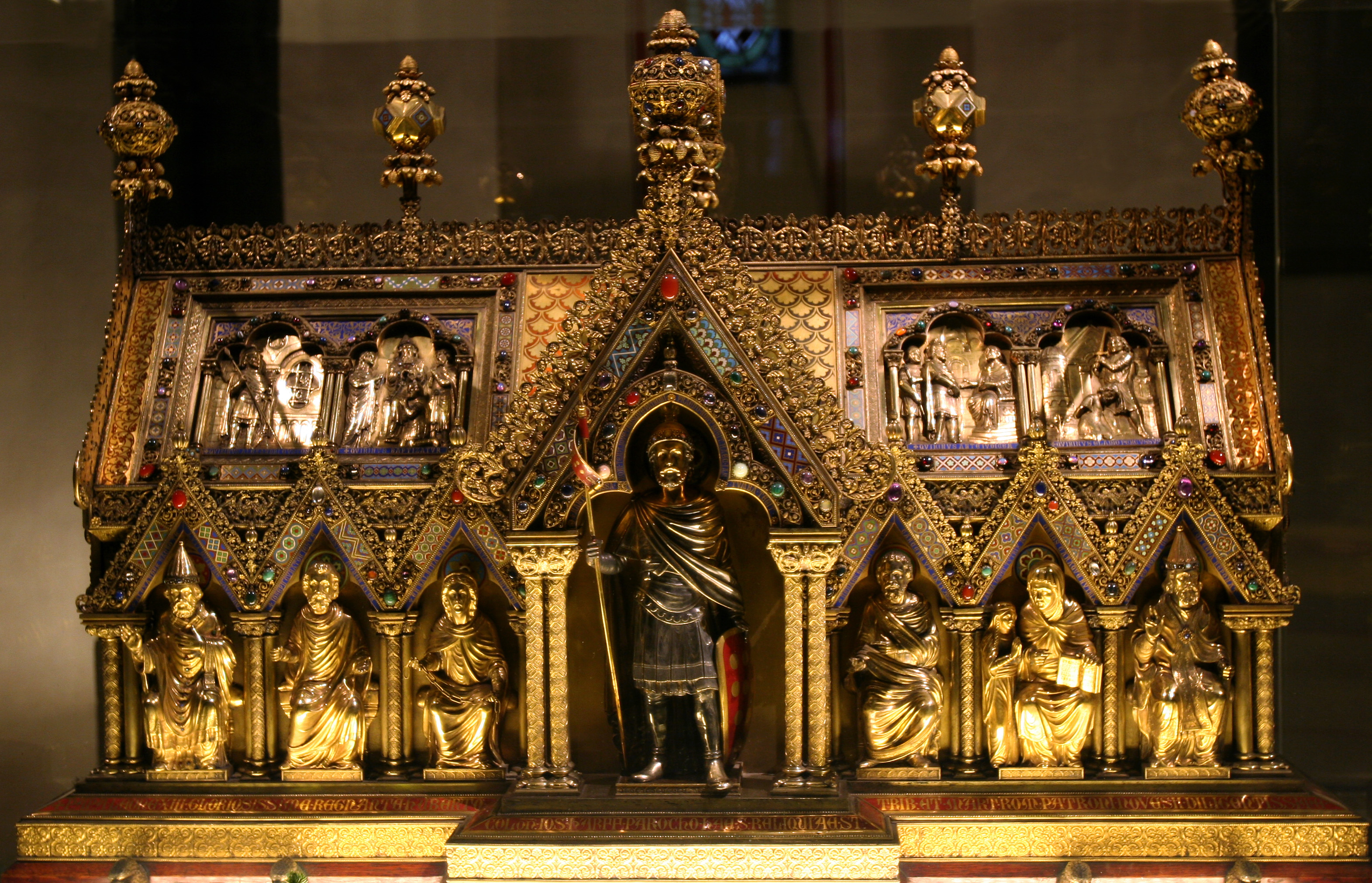
Reliquary holding Quirinus' relics

Ado took the name from these Acts and put it in his Martyrology for the date of 30 March, the day it was to be found in the Roman Martyrology (Quentin, "Les martyrologes historiques", 490). The latest edition of the Roman Martyrology commemorates Quirinus on 30 April.

Saint Quirinus is the patron saint of the city of Neuss. According to a document from Cologne dating from 1485, Quirinus' body was donated in 1050 by Pope Leo IX to an abbess of Neuss named Gepa (who is called a sister of the pope). In this way the relics came to the Romanesque Church of St. Quirinus at Neuss. A statue of Quirinus sits atop the church (which Jean-Baptiste Bernadotte attempted to plunder during the Napoleonic Wars).

Inhabitants of Neuss invoked Quirinus' aid during the Siege of Neuss by Charles the Bold, 1474–5. His cult spread to Cologne, Alsace, Scandinavia, western Germany, the Netherlands, and Italy, where he became the patron saint of Correggio. Numerous wells and springs were dedicated to him, and he was invoked against the bubonic plague, smallpox, and gout; he was also considered a patron saint of animals. Pilgrims to Neuss sought the Quirinuswasser (Quirinus water) from the Quirinusbrunnen (Quirinus spring or pump-room).

A farmers' saying associated with Quirinus' former feast day of 30 March was "Wie der Quirin, so der Sommer" ("As St. Quirinus' Day goes, so will the summer").

Quirinus, along with Hubertus, Cornelius and Anthony, was venerated as one of the Four Holy Marshals ("Vier Marschälle Gottes") in the Rhineland. Portraits of Quirinus and of Valentine appear at the top of the recto of the Nuremberg Chronicles (Folio CXXII [Geneva]).
