= Saint-Hubert, Belgium =

City in Wallonia, Belgium

Saint-Hubert: Sint-Houbert (Walloon)
- City and municipality
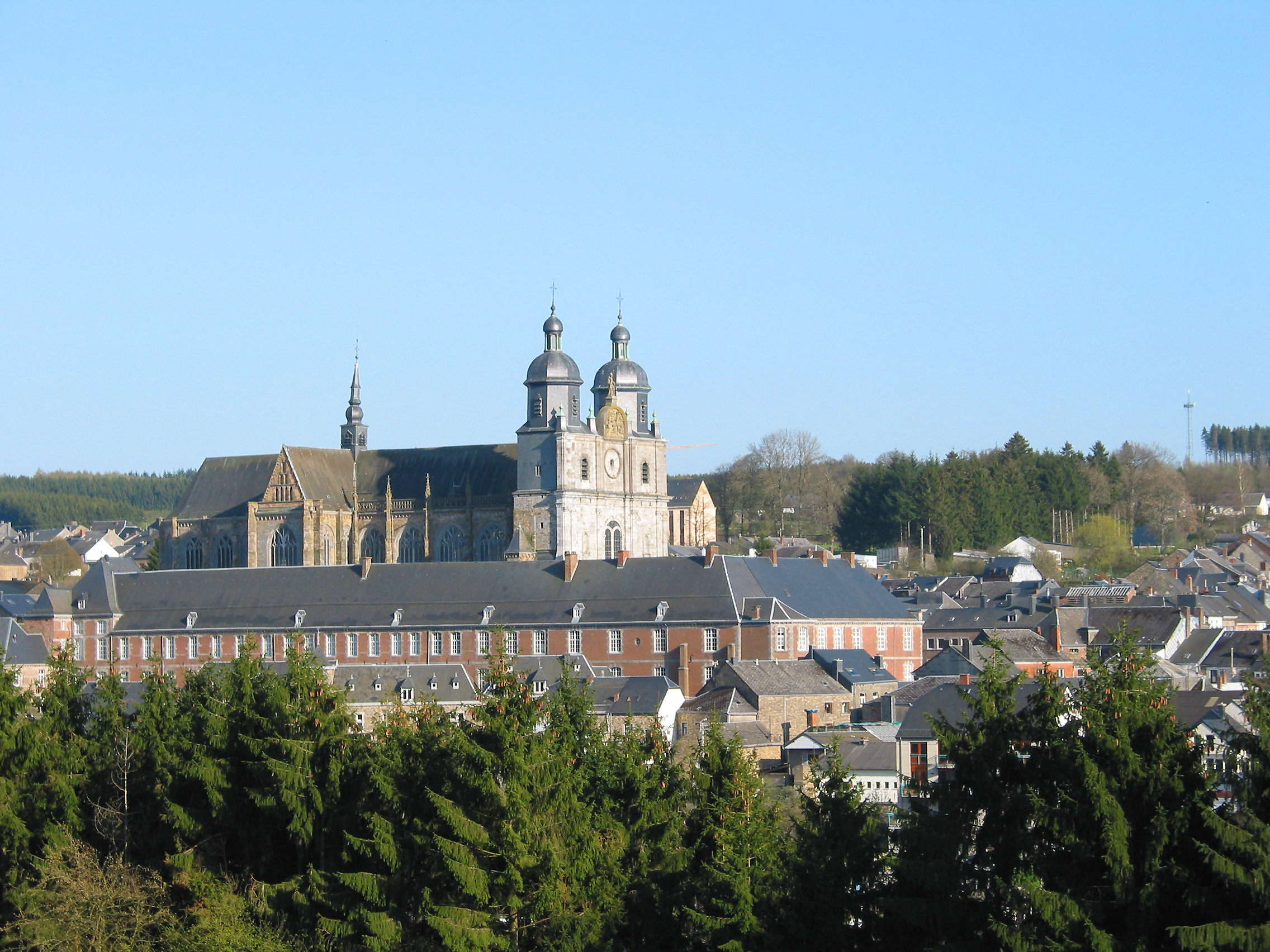
- View of Saint-Hubert

- Flag Coat of arms

- Location of Saint-Hubert in Luxembourg province
- Interactive map of Saint-Hubert
- Location in Belgium
- Coordinates: 50°1′30″N 05°22′20″E
- Country: Belgium
- Community: French Community
- Region: Wallonia
- Province: Luxembourg
- Arrondissement: Neufchâteau

Government
  - Mayor: Jean-Luc Henneaux (Cap 2018)
  - Governing party: Cap 2018

Area
  - Total: 111.99 km^{2} (43.24 sq mi)

Population (2018-01-01)
  - Total: 5,571
  - Density: 49.75/km^{2} (128.8/sq mi)
- Time zone: UTC+01:00 (CET)
  - Summer (DST): UTC+02:00 (CEST)
- Postal codes: 6870
- NIS code: 84059
- Area codes: 061
- Website: www.saint-hubert.be

Saint-Hubert (French pronunciation: [sɛ̃.t‿y.bɛʁ]; Walloon: Sint-Houbert) is a city and municipality of Wallonia located in the province of Luxembourg, Belgium.

On 1 January 2007 the municipality, which covers 111.16 km^{2} (42.92 sq mi), had 5,737 inhabitants, giving a population density of 51.6 inhabitants per square kilometre.

The municipality consists of the following districts: Arville, Awenne, Hatrival, Mirwart, Saint-Hubert, and Vesqueville. Other population centers include: Lorcy and Poix-Saint-Hubert.

The town is named in commemoration of Saint Hubert of Liège, whose body was moved in 825 to the Benedictine Abbey of Andage, thereafter called Abbey of Saint-Hubert.

== Climate ==
Climate data for Saint Hubert
| Month | Jan | Feb | Mar | Apr | May | Jun | Jul | Aug | Sep | Oct | Nov | Dec | Year |
|---|---|---|---|---|---|---|---|---|---|---|---|---|---|
| Mean daily maximum °C (°F) | 2.3 (36.1) | 3.2 (37.8) | 6.7 (44.1) | 9.9 (49.8) | 14.7 (58.5) | 17.1 (62.8) | 19.6 (67.3) | 19.6 (67.3) | 15.9 (60.6) | 11.4 (52.5) | 5.8 (42.4) | 3.3 (37.9) | 10.8 (51.4) |
| Mean daily minimum °C (°F) | −2.3 (27.9) | −2.4 (27.7) | −0.1 (31.8) | 1.9 (35.4) | 6.2 (43.2) | 8.9 (48.0) | 11.1 (52.0) | 11.1 (52.0) | 8.4 (47.1) | 5.0 (41.0) | 1.0 (33.8) | −0.9 (30.4) | 4.0 (39.2) |
| Average precipitation mm (inches) | 96.9 (3.81) | 76.0 (2.99) | 95.3 (3.75) | 76.8 (3.02) | 85.7 (3.37) | 100.4 (3.95) | 91.9 (3.62) | 72.9 (2.87) | 88.1 (3.47) | 102.7 (4.04) | 105.7 (4.16) | 108.8 (4.28) | 1,101.2 (43.33) |
| Average precipitation days | 15 | 12 | 15 | 13 | 13 | 13 | 12 | 10 | 12 | 13 | 15 | 16 | 159 |
Source: World Meteorological Organisation (UN)

== Gallery ==
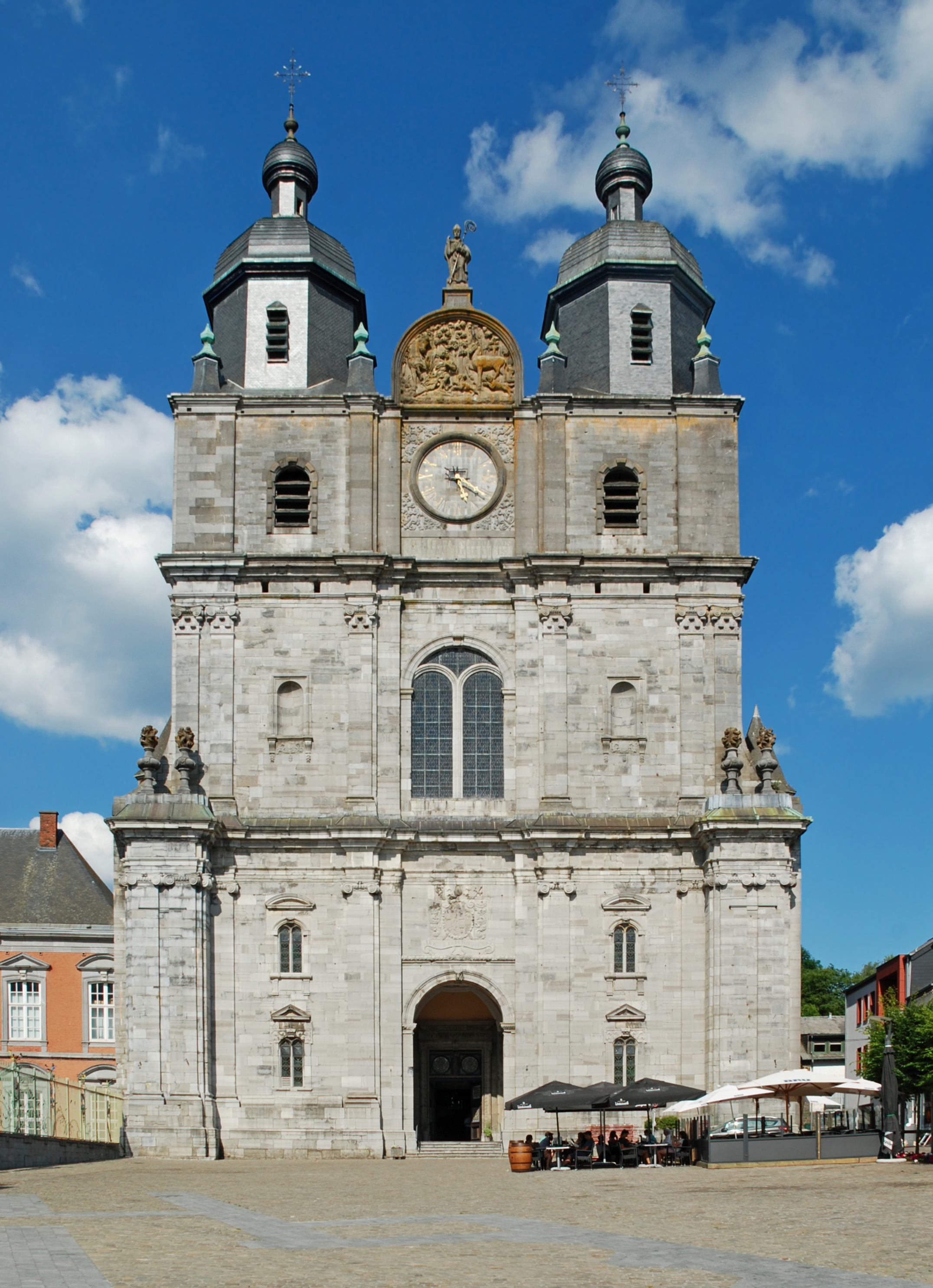
Basilica of Saint-Hubert

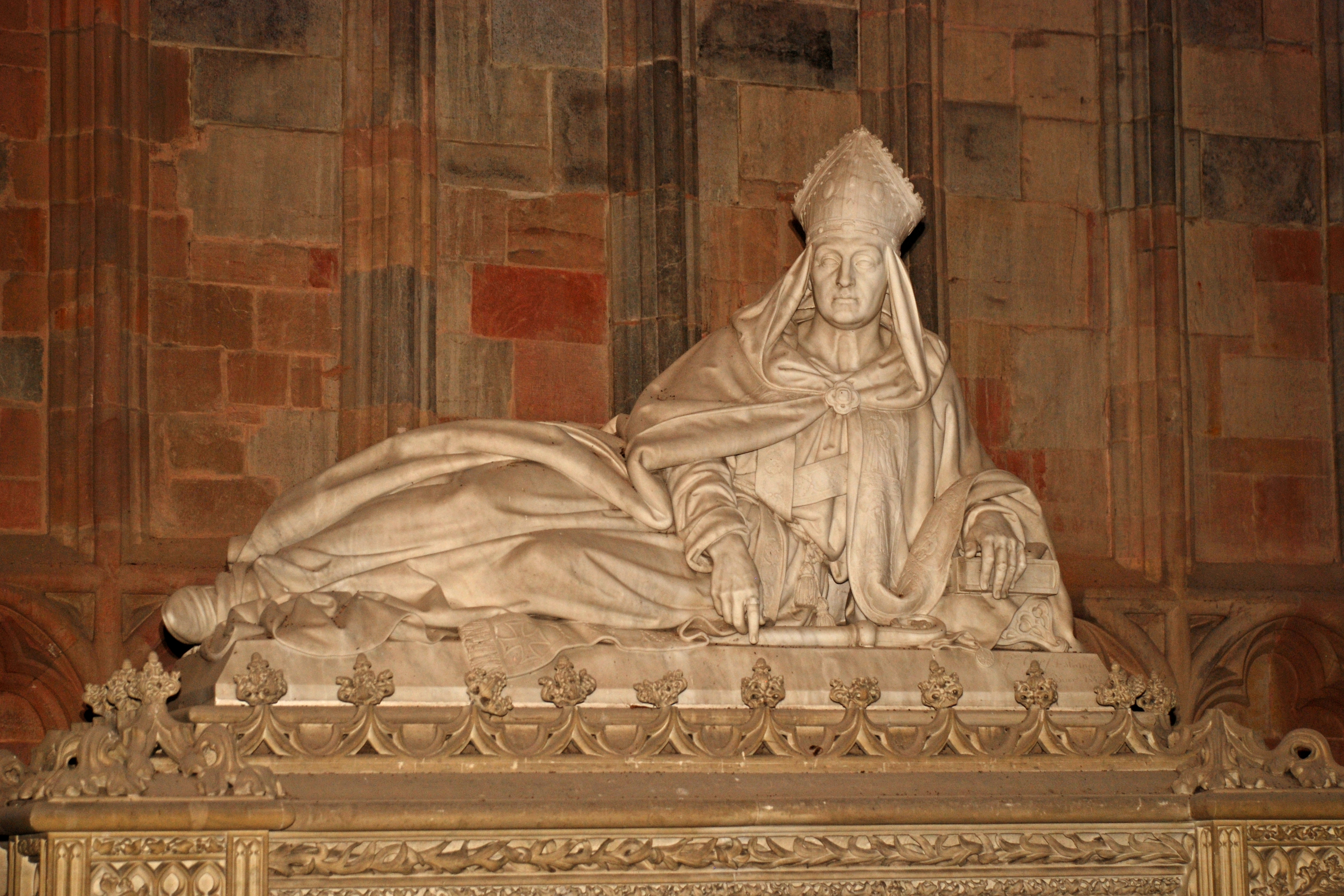
Cenotaph of Hubert of Liège by Guillaume Geefs (1847)

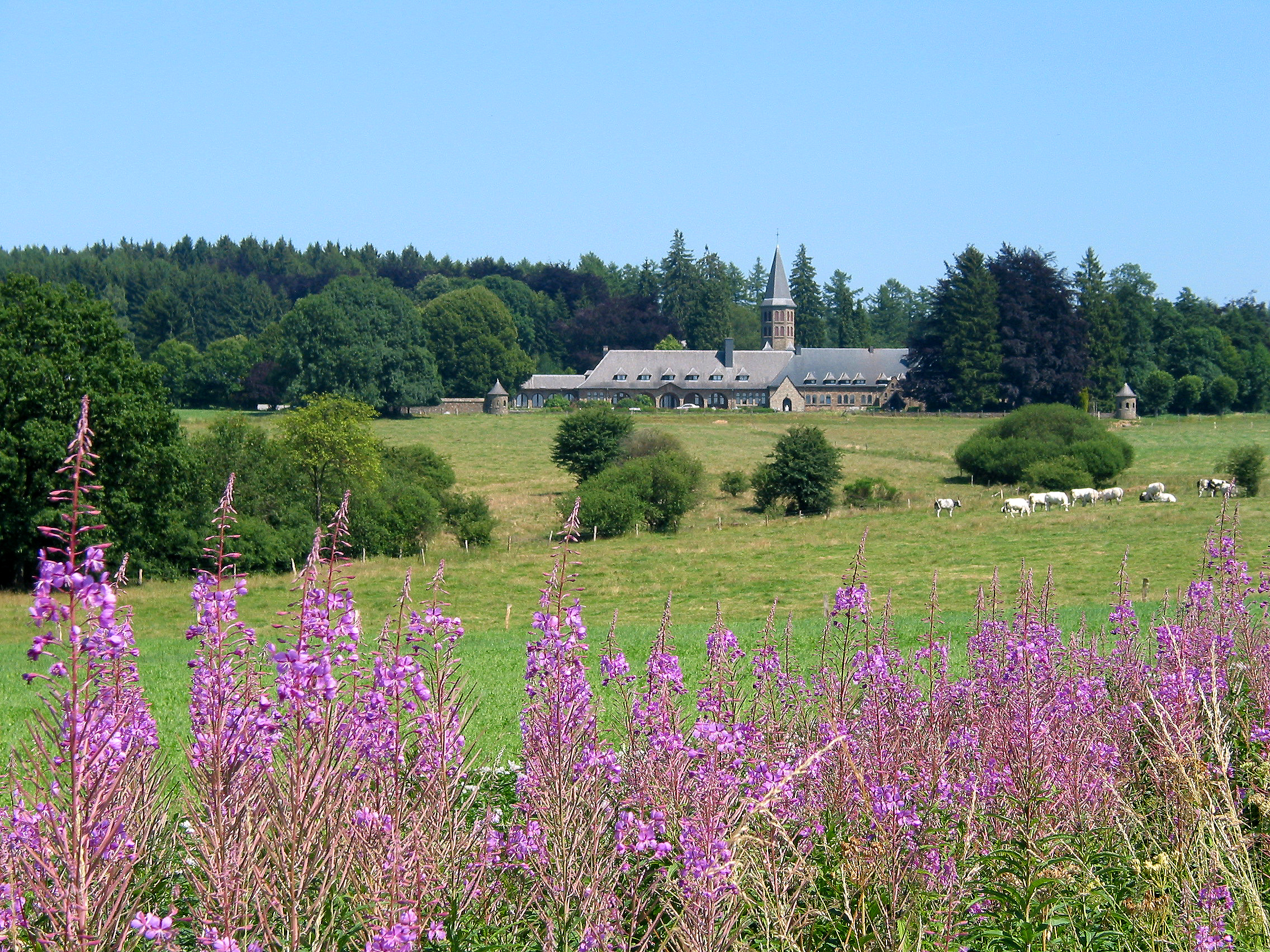
The Benedictine monastery of Our Lady of Hurtebise (near Saint-Hubert)

== See also ==
- List of protected heritage sites in Saint-Hubert, Belgium
