= List of airports in Belgium =

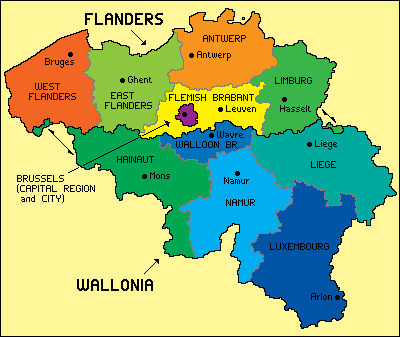
The regions and provinces of Belgium

This is a list of airports (aerodromes and heliports) in Belgium, sorted by location.

Names shown in bold indicate airports with scheduled service on commercial airlines.

City / location	Province	Region	ICAO	IATA	Name	Type	Ref
**Aerodromes**
Amougies	Hainaut	Wallonia	EBAM		Amougies Airfield	Private (Note: Classified as an ultralight aviation airfield (ULM))	
Antwerp / Deurne	Antwerp	Flanders	EBAW	ANR	**Antwerp International Airport**	Public	
Arlon	Luxembourg	Wallonia	EBAR		Arlon-Sterpenich Aerodrome	Private	
Assesse	Namur	Wallonia	EBML		Maillen Airfield	Private	
Ath	Hainaut	Wallonia	EBIS		Ath/Isières Airfield	Private	
Balen	Antwerp	Flanders	EBKH		Balen-Keiheuvel Aerodrome	Private	
Beauvechain	Walloon Brabant	Wallonia	EBBE		Beauvechain Air Base	Mil./Public	
Bertrix	Luxembourg	Wallonia	EBBX		Jehonville Air Base	Mil./Public	
Brasschaat	Antwerp	Flanders	EBBT		Brasschaat Airfield	Private	
Bruges / Ostend	West Flanders	Flanders	EBOS	OST	**Ostend–Bruges International Airport**	Public	
Zaventem	Flemish Brabant	Flanders	EBBR	BRU	**Brussels International Airport**	Public	
Melsbroek	Flemish Brabant	Flanders	EBMB		Melsbroek Air Base	Mil./Public	
Brustem / Sint-Truiden	Limburg	Flanders	EBST		Sint-Truiden / Brustem Airfield	Private	
Büllingen	Liège	Wallonia	EBBN		Büllingen Airfield	Private	
Cerfontaine	Namur	Wallonia	EBCF		Cerfontaine Airfield	Private	
Charleroi	Hainaut	Wallonia	EBCI	CRL	**Brussels South Charleroi Airport**	Public	
Chièvres	Hainaut	Wallonia	EBCV		Chièvres Air Base	Mil./Public	
Doische	Namur	Wallonia	EBMG		Doische Airfield	Private	
Éghezée	Namur	Wallonia	EBLN		Liernu Airfield	Private	
Elsenborn	Liège	Wallonia	EBLB		Elsenborn-Butgenbach Air Base	Mil./Public	
Florennes	Namur	Wallonia	EBFS		Florennes Air Base	Military	
Genappe	Walloon Brabant	Wallonia	EBBY		Baisy-Thy Airfield	Private	
Genk	Limburg	Flanders	EBZW		Zwartberg Airfield	Private	
Geraardsbergen	East Flanders	Flanders	EBGG		Overboelare Airfield	Private	
Goetsenhoven	Flemish Brabant	Flanders	EBTN		Goetsenhoven Airfield	Mil./Public	
Grimbergen	Flemish Brabant	Flanders	EBGB		Grimbergen Airfield	Private	
Hannut	Liège	Wallonia	EBAV		Avernas-le-Bauduin Airfield	Private	
Hasselt	Limburg	Flanders	EBZH		Kiewit Airfield	Private	
Hoevenen	Antwerp	Flanders	EBHN		Hoevenen Airfield	Private	
Kleine Brogel	Limburg	Flanders	EBBL		Kleine Brogel Air Base	Military	
Koksijde	West Flanders	Flanders	EBFN		Koksijde Air Base	Mil./Public	
Kortrijk / Wevelgem	West Flanders	Flanders	EBKT	KJK	Flanders International Airport	Public	
Leopoldsburg / Beverlo	Limburg	Flanders	EBLE		Leopoldsburg/Beverlo Airfield	Public	
Liège	Liège	Wallonia	EBLG	LGG	**Liège Airport**	Public	
Moorsele	West Flanders	Flanders	EBMO		Moorsele Airfield	Private	
Namur	Namur	Wallonia	EBNM		Namur-Suarlée Airfield	Private	
Neerpelt	Limburg	Flanders	~~EBNE~~		~~Neerpelt Airfield~~	Private	
Saint-Ghislain	Hainaut	Wallonia	EBSG		Saint-Ghislain Airfield	Private	
Saint-Hubert	Luxembourg	Wallonia	EBSU		Saint-Hubert Air Base	Military	
Saint-Hubert	Luxembourg	Wallonia	EBSH		Saint-Hubert Airfield	Private	
Schaffen	Flemish Brabant	Flanders	EBDT		Schaffen Air Base	Mil./Public	
Spa	Liège	Wallonia	EBSP		Spa-La Sauvenière Airfield	Private	
Theux	Liège	Wallonia	EBTX		Verviers-Theux Airfield	Private	
Tournai	Hainaut	Wallonia	EBTY		Tournai-Maubray Airfield	Private	
Ursel	East Flanders	Flanders	EBUL		Ursel Air Base	Mil./Public	
Vresse-sur-Semois	Namur	Wallonia	EBOR		Orchimont Aerodrome	Private	
Weelde	Antwerp	Flanders	EBWE		Weelde Air Base	Mil./Public	
Zoersel / Oostmalle	Antwerp	Flanders	EBZR		Oostmalle Airfield	Mil./Public	
Zuienkerke	West Flanders	Flanders	EBZU		Zuienkerke Airfield	Private	
Zutendaal	Limburg	Flanders	EBSL		Zutendaal Air Base	Mil./Public	
**Heliports**
Aalst	East Flanders	Flanders	EBAL		Aalst Hospital Heliport	Private	
Anderlecht	Brussels	Brussels	EBUB		Erasmus Hospital Heliport	Private	
Antwerp	Antwerp	Flanders	EBDR		Antwerp/Commandant Fourcault Heliport	Private	
Antwerp	Antwerp	Flanders	EBAK		Antwerp/Kiel Heliport	Private	
Antwerp	Antwerp	Flanders	EBMD		Antwerp/Middelheim Hospital Heliport	Private	
Brecht	Antwerp	Flanders	EBBH		Brecht/Keysers Heliport	Private	
Brecht	Antwerp	Flanders	EBBC		Brecht/Luyckx Heliport	Private	
Brecht	Antwerp	Flanders	EBBV		Brecht/Vochten Heliport	Private	
Bruges	West Flanders	Flanders	EBSJ		AZ Sint-Jan Heliport	Private	
Bruges	West Flanders	Flanders	EBSS		Sint-Lucas Hospital Heliport	Private	
Diksmuide	West Flanders	Flanders	EBDI		Diksmuide Heliport	Private	
Dilsen-Stokkem	Limburg	Flanders	EBDL		Dilsen-Stokkem/Lanklaar Heliport	Private	
Douvrain	Hainaut	Wallonia	EBBA		Baudour Heliport	Private	
Edegem	Antwerp	Flanders	EBEU		Universitair Ziekenhuis Antwerpen Hospital Heliport	Private	
Evergem	East Flanders	Flanders	EBEB		Evergem/Belzele Heliport	Private	
Francorchamps	Liège	Wallonia	EBFR		Francorchamps Heliport	Private	
Ghent	East Flanders	Flanders	EBGT		Ghent/Industry Zone Heliport	Private	
Halen	Limburg	Flanders	EBHL		Halen Heliport	Private	
Ham	Limburg	Flanders	EBHA		Ham Heliport	Private	
Hasselt	Limburg	Flanders	EBHM		Hasselt/Maasland Heliport	Private	
Holsbeek	Flemish Brabant	Flanders	EBHO		Holsbeek Heliport	Private	
Houthalen-Helchteren	Limburg	Flanders	EBHT		Houthalen Heliport	Private	
Kasterlee	Antwerp	Flanders	EBTK		Tielen/Kasterlee Heliport	Private	
Knokke-Heist	West Flanders	Flanders	EBKW		Knokke-Heist/Westkapelle Heliport	Private	
Kruishoutem	East Flanders	Flanders	EBKR		Kruishoutem/Sons Heliport	Private	
Nokere	East Flanders	Flanders	EBNK		Nokere/Suys Heliport	Private	
Kuurne	West Flanders	Flanders	EBKU		Kuurne Heliport		
Les Bruyères	Hainaut	Wallonia	EBCH		Shape Pad Heliport		
Leuven	Flemish Brabant	Flanders	EBGA		UZ Leuven Hospital Heliport	Private	
Liège	Liège	Wallonia	EBLC		CHR de La Citadelle Hospital Heliport	Private	
Liège	Liège	Wallonia	EBLS		Centre Hospitalier Heliport	Private	
Lierneux	Liège	Wallonia	EBMS		Centre Médical Héliporté ASBL (CMH) Heliport	Private	
Lint	Antwerp	Flanders	EBLT		Lint Heliport	Private	
Lochristi	East Flanders	Flanders	EBLZ		Zaffelare Heliport		
Loverval	Hainaut	Wallonia	EBGE		Grand Hôpital de Charleroi (GHDC Asbl) Heliport	Private	
Lummen	Limburg	Flanders	EBLU		Lummen Heliport	Private	
Meerbeek	Flemish Brabant	Flanders	EBME		Meerbeek Heliport	Private	
Meise	Flemish Brabant	Flanders	EBMW		Meise/Wolvertem Heliport	Private	
Meulebeke	West Flanders	Flanders	EBLM		Meulebeke Heliport	Private	
Michelbeke	East Flanders	Flanders	EBBM		Brakel/Michelbeke Heliport	Private	
Montigny-le-Tilleul	Hainaut	Wallonia	EBMT		Centre Hospitalier Universitaire A. Vésale Heliport	Private	
Namur	Namur	Wallonia	EBNB		Clinique Saint-Luc Bouge Heliport	Private	
Neerpelt	Limburg	Flanders	EBNP		Neerpelt/Tilburgs Heliport	Private	
Ostend	West Flanders	Flanders	EBNH		Oostende Heliport	Private	
Oud-Heverlee	Flemish Brabant	Flanders	EBOB		Oud-Heverlee/Blanden Heliport	Private	
Pecq	Hainaut	Wallonia	EBPW		Pecq/Warcoing Heliport	Private	
Pont-à-Celles	Hainaut	Wallonia	EBBZ		Buzet Airfield	Private	
Ranst	Antwerp	Flanders	EBEN		Ranst/Engels Heliport	Private	
Ranst	Antwerp	Flanders	EBLY		Ranst/Lymar Heliport	Private	
Ranst	Antwerp	Flanders	EBRO		Ranst/Van Den Bosch Heliport	Private	
Reninge	West Flanders	Flanders	EBLR		Reninge Heliport	Private	
Rotselaar	Flemish Brabant	Flanders	EBVU		Rotselaar Heliport	Private	
Rumbeke	West Flanders	Flanders	EBRR		Roeselare/Rumbeke Heliport	Private	
Schilde	Antwerp	Flanders	EBAS		Schilde/'s-Gravenwezel Heliport	Private	
Sint-Pieters-Leeuw	Flemish Brabant	Flanders	EBSW		Sint-Pieters-Leeuw Heliport	Private	
Veurne	West Flanders	Flanders	EBVS		Veurne/Sint-Augustinus Heliport	Private	
Veurne	West Flanders	Flanders	EBVE		Oeren Heliport	Private	
Waasmunster	East Flanders	Flanders	EBWA		Waasmunster Heliport	Private	
Wingene	West Flanders	Flanders	EBWI		Wingene Heliport	Private	
Wingene	West Flanders	Flanders	EBWZ		Wingene/Zwevezele Heliport	Private	
Woluwe-Saint-Lambert	Brussels	Brussels	EBUC		Cliniques Universitaires Saint-Luc Hospital Heliport	Private	
Ypres	West Flanders	Flanders	EBYP		Regionaal Ziekenhuis Jan Yperman VZW Hospital Heliport	Private	
Zandvoorde	West Flanders	Flanders	EBZO		Zonnebeke/Zandvoorde Heliport	Private	
Zingem	East Flanders	Flanders	EBZI		Zingem Heliport	Private	
Zomergem	East Flanders	Flanders	EBZM		Zomergem Heliport	Private	
	West Flanders	Flanders	EBOO		Oostdijckbank Heliport	Private	

== See also ==
- Transport in Belgium
- Belgian Air Component
- List of airports by ICAO code: EB-EG#EB – Belgium
- Former aerodromes of Belgium
- Wikipedia:WikiProject Aviation/Airline destination lists: Europe#Belgium
