= Saint-Hubert =

Saint Hubert of Liège is the patron saint of hunters, mathematicians, opticians and metalworkers.

Saint-Hubert may also refer to:

== Places ==
=== Belgium ===
- Saint-Hubert, Belgium, a municipality in the Belgian province of Luxembourg
- Saint-Hubert Air Base (Base de Saint-Hubert), a military airport located northeast of Saint-Hubert
- Saint-Hubert Airport (Belgium) (Aérodrome de Saint-Hubert), a civilian airport located north of Saint-Hubert

=== Canada ===
- Saint-Hubert, Quebec, a borough of Longueuil
  - Longueuil–Saint-Hubert (AMT), formerly Saint-Hubert (AMT), a railway station
  - Montréal/St-Hubert Airport, an airport in Longueuil
  - CFB St. Hubert, a former Canadian Forces military base in Longueuil
- Saint Hubert Street, a street in Montreal
- Saint-Hubert-de-Rivière-du-Loup, Quebec, a village in the Rivière-du-Loup Regional County Municipality
- St. Hubert Mission, community in Saskatchewan

=== France ===
- Saint-Hubert, Moselle, a village and commune in the Moselle department
- Moulins-Saint-Hubert, a village and commune in the Meuse department
- Château de Saint-Hubert, a royal mansion in Perray-en-Yvelines

== Other ==
- St. Hubert hound, a breed of dog related to the bloodhound
- Île Saint-Hubert, a fictional island in Jurassic World Rebirth
- St-Hubert (restaurant), a Canadian restaurant chain, named for the original location on Saint Hubert Street in Montreal

== See also ==
- Royal Galleries of Saint-Hubert in Brussels
- Saint Hubert's Key
