= Saint-Hubert Airport =

Saint-Hubert Airport may refer to:

- Montreal/Saint-Hubert Airport, Canada
- Saint-Hubert Airfield, Belgium
- Saint-Hubert Air Base, Belgium
