= Château de Saint-Hubert (disambiguation) =

Château de Saint-Hubert is a French royal mansion in Le Perray-en-Yvelines.

Château de Saint-Hubert or Schloß Hubertus may also refer to:

- Château du Grand Chavanon, also known as the Château de Saint-Hubert, historic château in Neuvy-sur-Barangeon, Cher, France.
- Schloß Hubertus, a 1934 film
- Schloß Hubertus, a 1954 film
- Schloß Hubertus, a 1973 film
- Schloss Hubertus, an 1895 novel by Ludwig Ganghofer

== See also ==
- Saint-Hubert (disambiguation)
