= EBIS =

EBIS can refer to:

- Eaglebridge International School, an international school in Dandong, Liaoning, China
- Electron Beam Ion Source, a device that creates atomic and molecular ions
- Ath/Isières Airfield (ICAO: EBIS), a private airfield in Ath, Wallonia, Belgium
