= Zuienkerke Airfield =

- IATA: none; ICAO: EBZU

Summary
- Airport type: Private
- Operator: Zuienkerke Aviation ULM
- Serves: Zuienkerke
- Location: Belgium
- Elevation AMSL: 1 ft / 0 m
- Coordinates: 51°15′24″N 003°08′26″E
- Website: www.ebzu-airfield.be

Map
- Location in Belgium

Runways
Direction	Length		Surface
Direction	m	ft	Surface
17/35	399	1,309	Grass
- Sources: Belgian AIP

Zuienkerke Airfield (ICAO: EBZU) is a ULM-only airfield located near Zuienkerke, West Flanders, Belgium. Like many recreational aerodromes in Belgium, its use is subject to prior permission from the operator.

== See also ==
- List of airports in Belgium
