= Ferdinand Verschaeve =

Belgian aviation pioneer

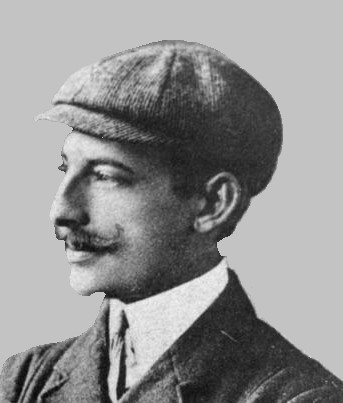
- Born: Ferdinand Joseph Verschaeve; 21 August 1876; Liège, Belgium
- Died: 8 April 1914 (aged 37); Sint-Job-in-'t-Goor, Belgium
- Other names: Le Démon Liégeois; Le Diable Liégeois
- Occupations: Aviation pioneer, test pilot, flight instructor

Ferdinand Verschaeve (21 August 1876 – 8 April 1914) was a Belgian aviation pioneer, test pilot, and flight instructor. He was also known by the nicknames "Le Démon Liégeois" and "Le Diable Liégeois".

== Biography ==
=== Early life ===
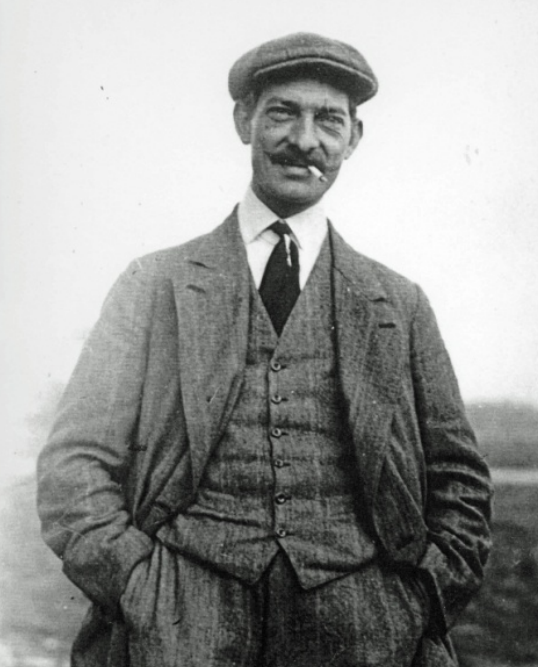
Verschaeve

Ferdinand (Fernand) Joseph Verschaeve was born on 21 August 1876, the son of Louis Verschaeve and Victoire Joséphine Gilet, who had moved to Liège. From an early age, Verschaeve was interested in engines. Later, he became a skilled motorcyclist and test rider for the Belgian manufacturer Saroléa. After leaving that company, he applied his experience to the development of the Verschaeve & Truffaut engines, the oldest known from 1902. In 1905, he attempted to break the speed record at the Liège velodrome.

=== Aviation ===
On 23 August 1910, Verschaeve made three flights at the Kiewit Airfield during a busy day, alongside Jules de Laminne, the local flight school founder, who made 11 flights, and Lambiotte who made 8. On 30 September 1910, Verschaeve obtained his pilot's license, becoming the 17th Belgian to do so and was then officially authorized to fly. During the International Flight Week at Kiewit from 8 to 16 October 1910, the "Liège Devil" survived a crash near Maastricht in the Netherlands. One year later, on 10 September 1911, he flew again from Kiewit without incident.

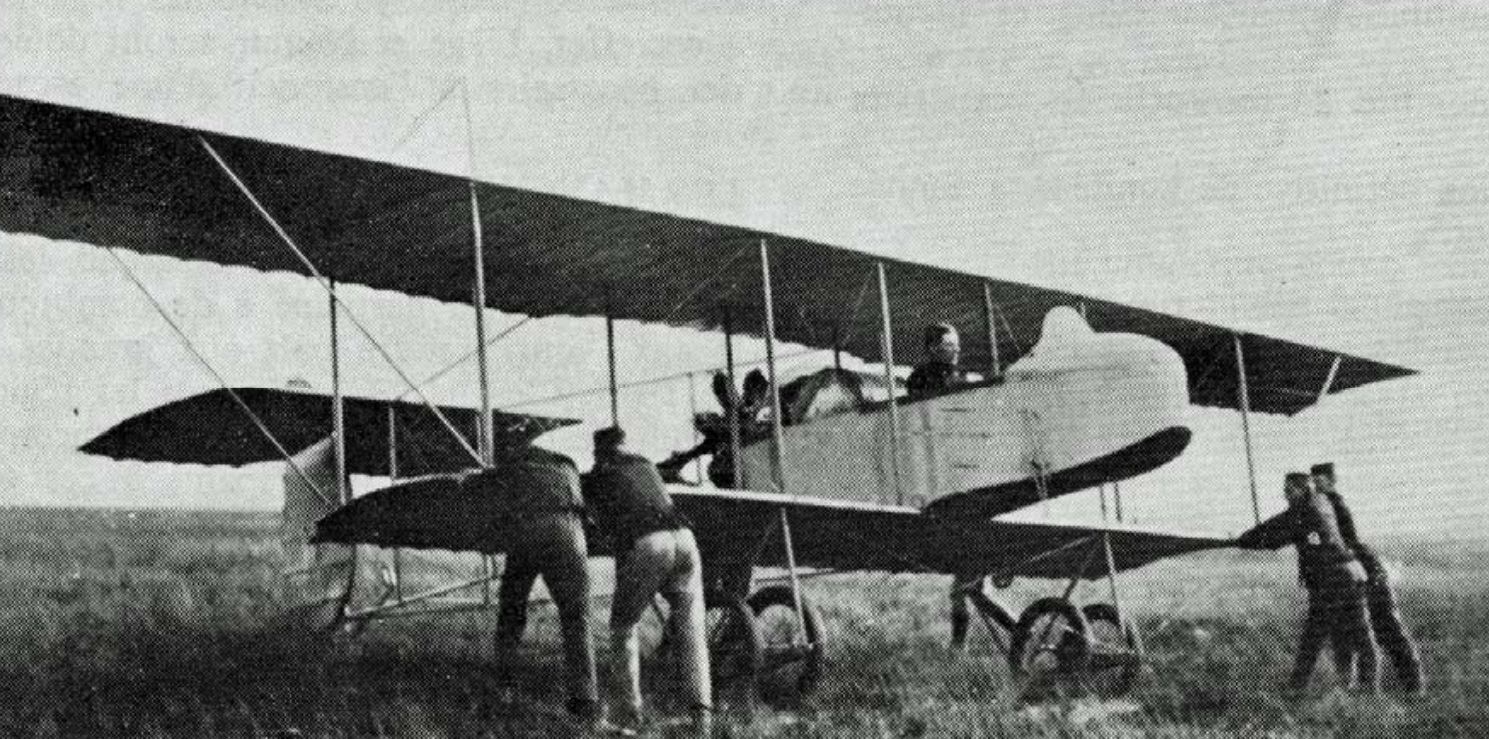
Jéro-Farman HF20 in Kiewit

In March 1912, Verschaeve was hired as chief pilot and flight instructor at the company Bollekens - Jéro. In early September that year, he attempted to participate with a converted seaplane in the "Competition for power and colonial seaplanes" at Temse. Since they arrived after the regulatory deadline, Fernand Verschaeve and René Vertongen performed demonstrations above the Scheldt near Antwerp all day. On 22 December 1912, Verschaeve set a world record for duration and altitude with four passengers in Sint-Job: 37 minutes 6 seconds and 596 meters.

He received the Brichart Prize for the pilot who, from 1910 to 1912, carried the heaviest useful load in a flight of at least half an hour — 264 kg.

Verschaeve was closely associated with Jan Olieslagers, the "Antwerp Devil". Together, they traveled to Rotterdam for airshows at the Woudestein field on Honingerdijk, where the Dutchman Jan van Bussel (born Joseph Maurer) also participated. While testing the new military aircraft model Jéro-Farman HF20 (23Bis) on 8 April 1914, Verschaeve crashed and died from his injuries.

== Posthumous ==
He was originally buried at the Kiel Cemetery and later reinterred in the Schoonselhof cemetery, section Z1, after the closure of the former in the 1930s. His monument features a bronze plaque designed by Emiel Jespers.

A hangar at the Kiewit Airfield in Hasselt was named after him. The hangar was damaged on 9 July 1914 when Raymond Hubert and Lucien Poot crashed their Farman HF 20 while taking off; Raymond Hubert was killed in the accident.

== Gallery ==
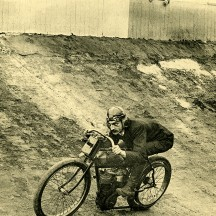
1905 at the Liège velodrome

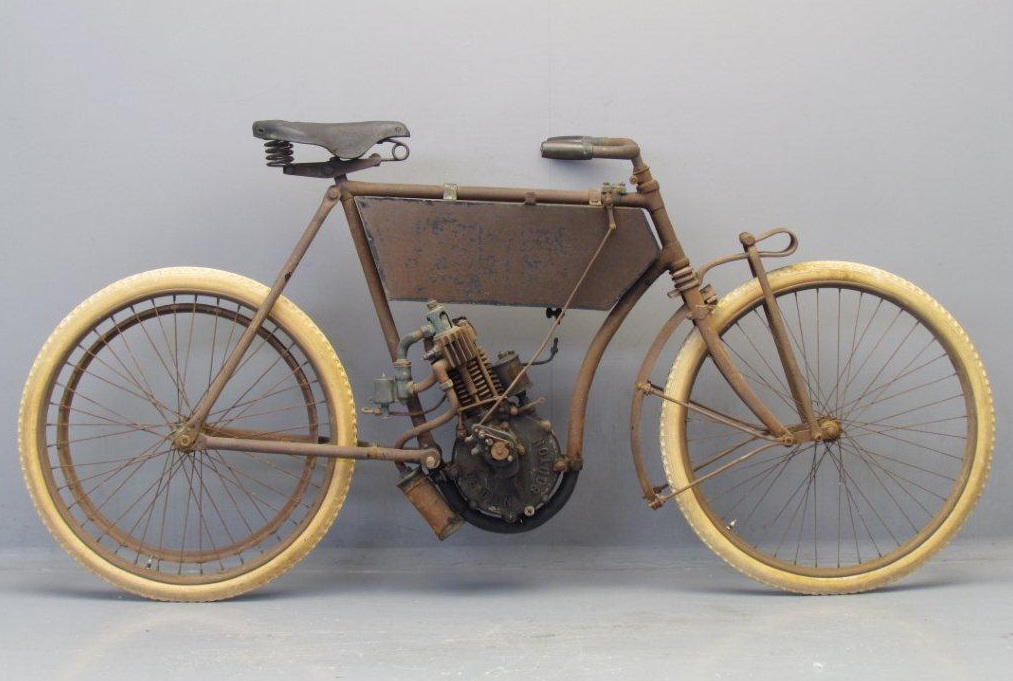
Verschaeve & Truffaut 1902 motorcycle with a 400 cc De Dion-Bouton AIV engine
