= Kuurne Heliport =

- IATA: none; ICAO: EBKU

Summary
- Airport type: Public
- Serves: Kuurne
- Location: Belgium
- Elevation AMSL: 49 ft / 15 m
- Coordinates: 50°51′31″N 003°15′20″E

Map
- Location in Belgium

Helipads
Number	Length		Surface
Number	m	ft	Surface
1	14	46	Asphalt
- Source: Landings.com

Kuurne Heliport (ICAO: EBKU) is a heliport located near Kuurne, West Flanders, Belgium.

== See also ==
- List of airports in Belgium
