= Reninge Heliport =

- IATA: none; ICAO: EBLR

Summary
- Airport type: Private
- Operator: Restaurant 't Convent
- Serves: Reninge
- Location: Belgium
- Elevation AMSL: 25 ft / 8 m
- Coordinates: 50°56′02″N 02°45′18″E

Map
- Location in Belgium

Helipads
Number	Length		Surface
Number	m	ft	Surface
1	21	69	Concrete
- Sources: Belgian AIP

Reninge Heliport (ICAO: EBLR) is a private heliport located near Reninge, West Flanders, Belgium.

== See also ==
- List of airports in Belgium
