= Pukkelpop =

Annual music festival near Hasselt, Belgium

Coordinates: 50°57′38″N 5°21′21″E

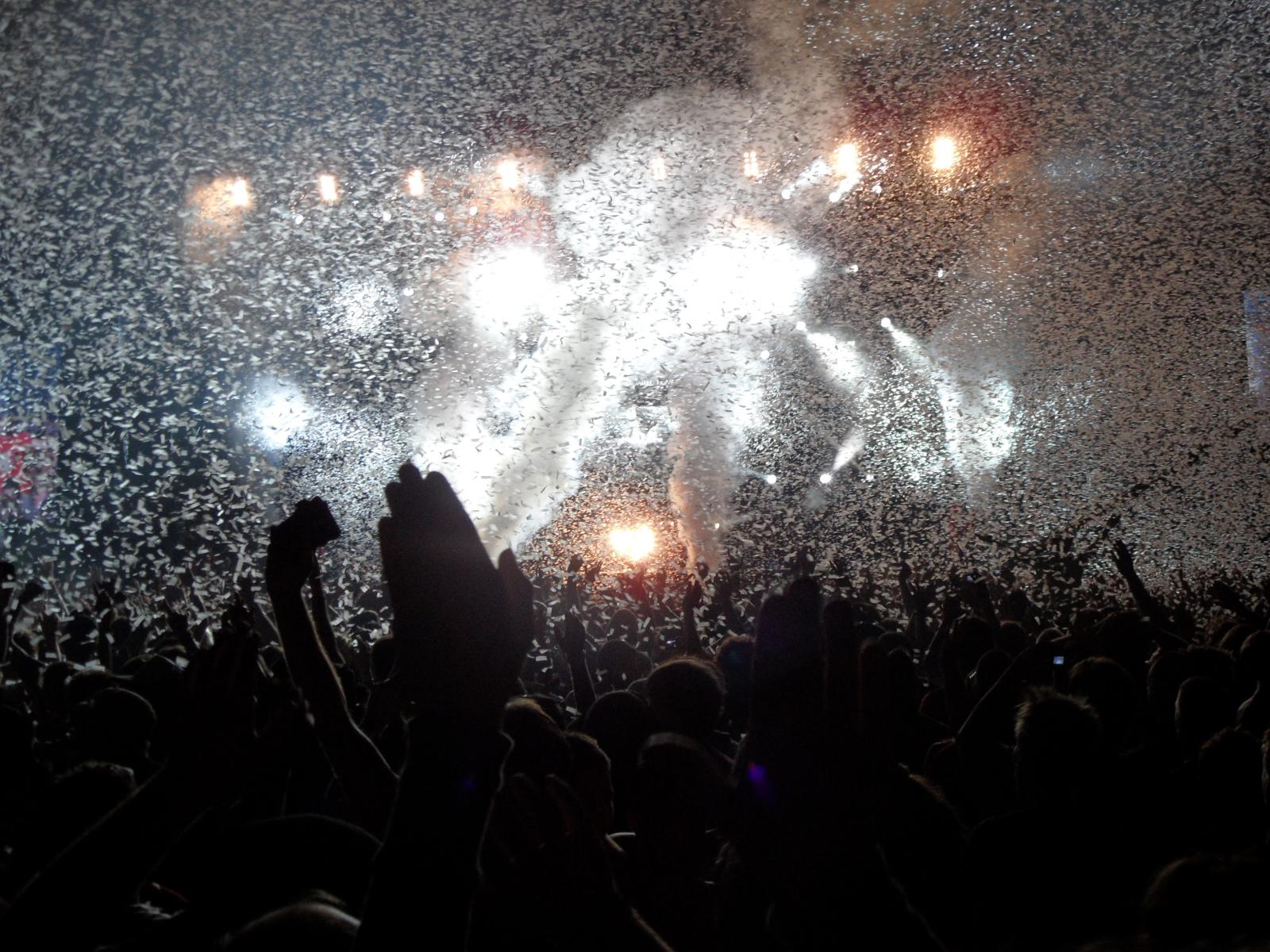
- Genre: Rock, electronic, pop, hip hop, punk, heavy metal, dance
- Dates: Mid-to-late August (since 1988)
- Locations: Kiewit-Hasselt, Belgium (since 1991)
- Years active: 1985–present
- Founders: Hujo (Humanistische Jongeren van Leopoldsburg)
- Attendance: 299,000
- Capacity: 66,000
- Website: pukkelpop.be

Pukkelpop is an annual music festival that takes place near the city of Hasselt, Belgium in mid- to late August. It is held within a large enclosure of fields and woodland—adjacent to a dual carriageway called Kempische Steenweg—in the village of Kiewit, approximately 7 km north of Hasselt. It is one of the largest music festivals in Belgium, with an attendance of 180,000 over the course of the event in 2009.

The program is noted for its wide variety of alternative music, spanning styles such as rock, pop, electronic, dance, hip-hop, punk and heavy metal. The event's organizers aim for a "progressive and contemporary" musical event. Notable acts that have performed at previous editions include Beastie Boys, Papa Roach, Rihanna, Within Temptation, Sonic Youth, Placebo, Ramones, Nirvana, Red Hot Chili Peppers, The Smashing Pumpkins, Foo Fighters, Radiohead, Metallica, PJ Harvey, Green Day, Blink-182, Guns N' Roses, Pixies, Daft Punk, The Prodigy, Tame Impala, Arctic Monkeys, Nine Inch Nails, Iron Maiden, Björk, The Stone Roses, Idles, and Eminem.

"Pukkel" is the Dutch word for "pimple".

== History ==
The festival was founded in 1985 by youth organisation Humanistic Youth of Leopoldsburg (in Dutch: Humanistische Jongeren van Leopoldsburg or "Hujo"). It originated as a single day event, held on 21 July — a national holiday in Belgium — in the village of Leopoldsburg, located approximately 25 km north of the event's current home in Kiewit. The inaugural event in 1985 took place at the village football grounds of Complex Excelsior Heppen and featured seven acts, with English songwriter Anne Clark headlining. The first year was attended by 3,000 people.

In 1988, the festival moved to the village of Hechtel-Eksel where it was held at Sanicole Airfield. The festival was also moved to late August. In 1989, the festival was cancelled after the two headliners, New Order and The Sugarcubes, cancelled their appearances a few weeks before the event. The festival returned in 1990, again taking place in Hechtel-Eksel, and reached a peak of 10,000 attendees. Nick Cave and the Bad Seeds headlined.

In 1991, the festival moved to its current home in Kiewit. That year, the event took place on the grounds of the children's petting farm (Dutch: Kinderboerderij) located in the village. Ramones headlined on a bill which included Nirvana, who performed at the festival a month prior to the release of the group's breakthrough album Nevermind. In 1992, the festival site was moved to the fields by the Kempische Steenweg motorway, where it has been held ever since.

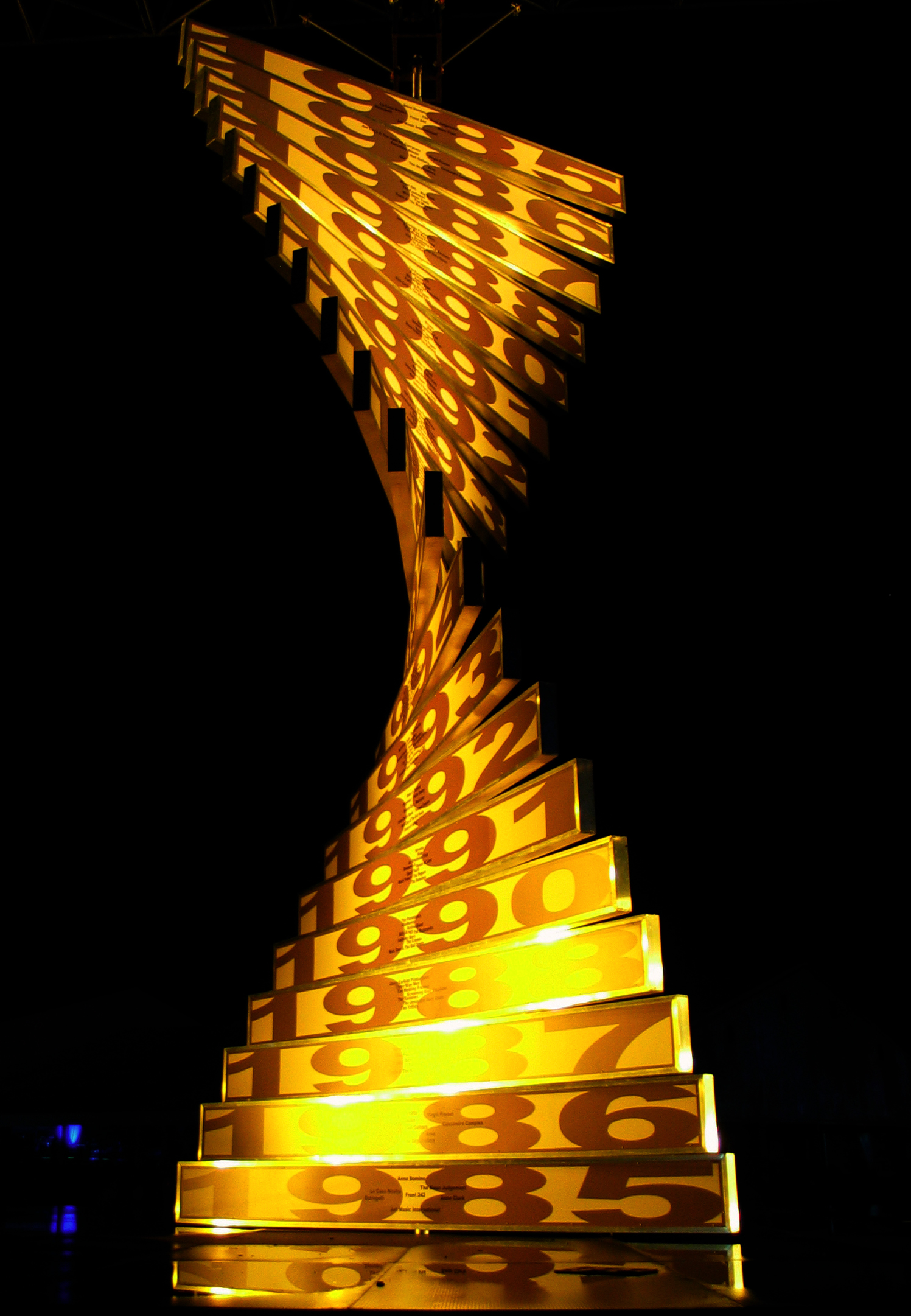
A shot of the commemorative stand at the 2005 edition. The stand was installed to mark the event's 20th anniversary

In 1993, a new indoor stage called The Marquee was added, supplementing the outdoor main stage and almost doubling the number of performers over the previous year. A second indoor stage, the Dance Hall, was added in 1994. In 1995, for the festival's tenth anniversary, the event became a two-day event for the first time, with Neil Young and The Smashing Pumpkins as the headlining acts. The festival also reached a peak in attendees at 60,000.

In 1996, two new stages were added: the outdoor Skate Stage, and a smaller-sized marquee called Club. Another marquee, named the Boiler Room, was added in 1997, bringing the total number of stages to six. From 1998 to 2001, the Skate Stage was renamed to the Hip-hop Stage for one of the two festival days, exclusively focused on rap and hip-hop artists such as Jurassic 5 and The Pharcyde. In 1999, the dance event Creamfields was amalgamated into Pukkelpop on the first day of the event; as a result most of the existing stages exclusively showcased dance music under different names. 1999 also saw the debut of the Experimental Stage, renamed to ChateauXCrapule the following year, and shortened to Chateau from the 2004 edition.

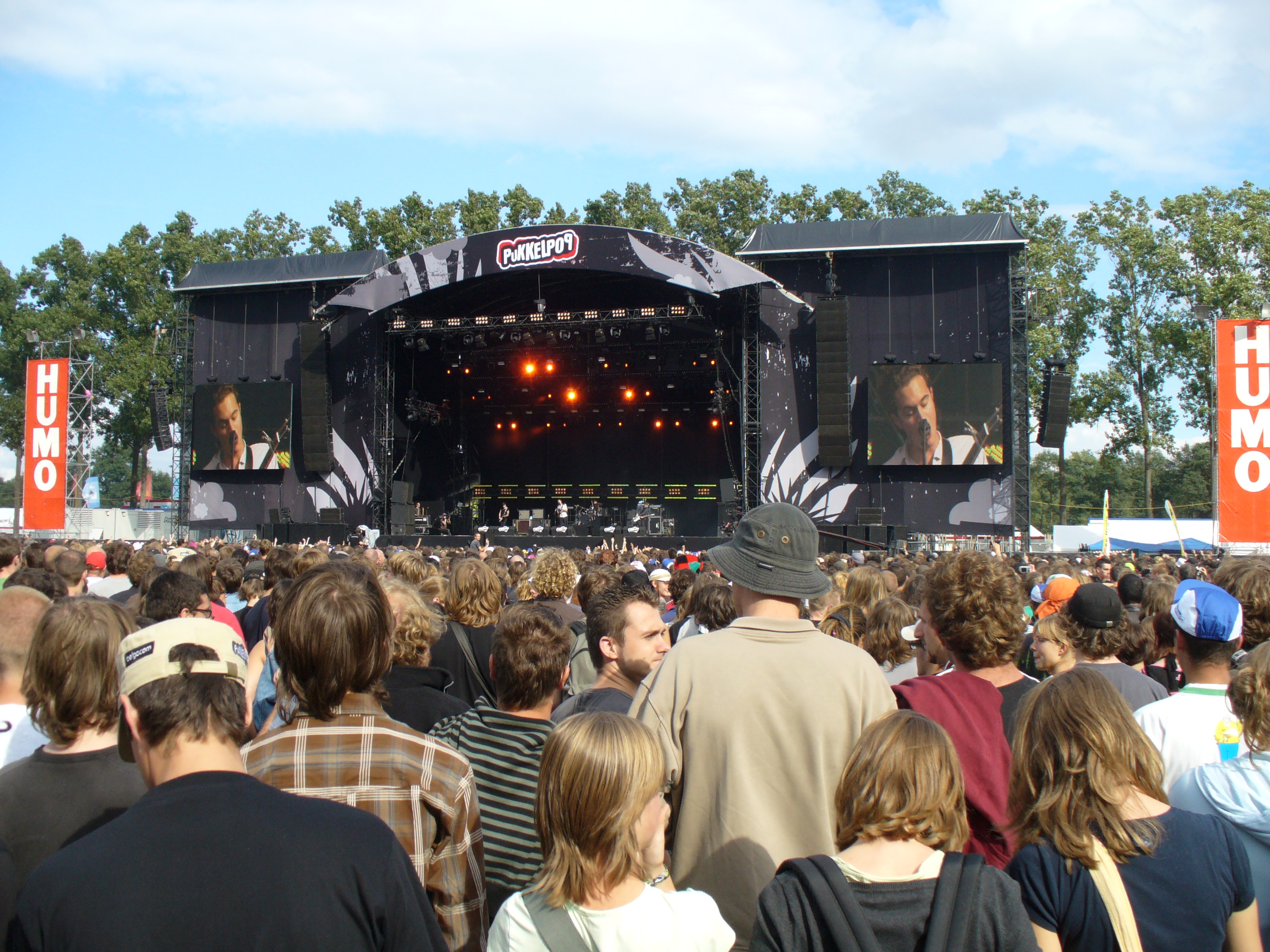
British band Editors performing on the main stage at the 2007 edition

In 2000, an exchange programme was announced with Oppikoppi, an annual music festival held in South Africa near the city of Pretoria. In the same year, Eminem was forced to cancel his confirmed headline slot at the festival as he was barred from leaving the United States.

In 2001, the festival became a three-day event for the first time, reaching an attendance peak of 115,000, a 76% increase over the previous year. In 2004, an eighth stage was added, called Wablief? (Dutch word for "What?"). In 2005, the festival celebrated its 20th anniversary, featuring headliners Pixies, The Prodigy and Nick Cave and the Bad Seeds. The event also reached another attendance peak, totaling 137,000 festival-goers.

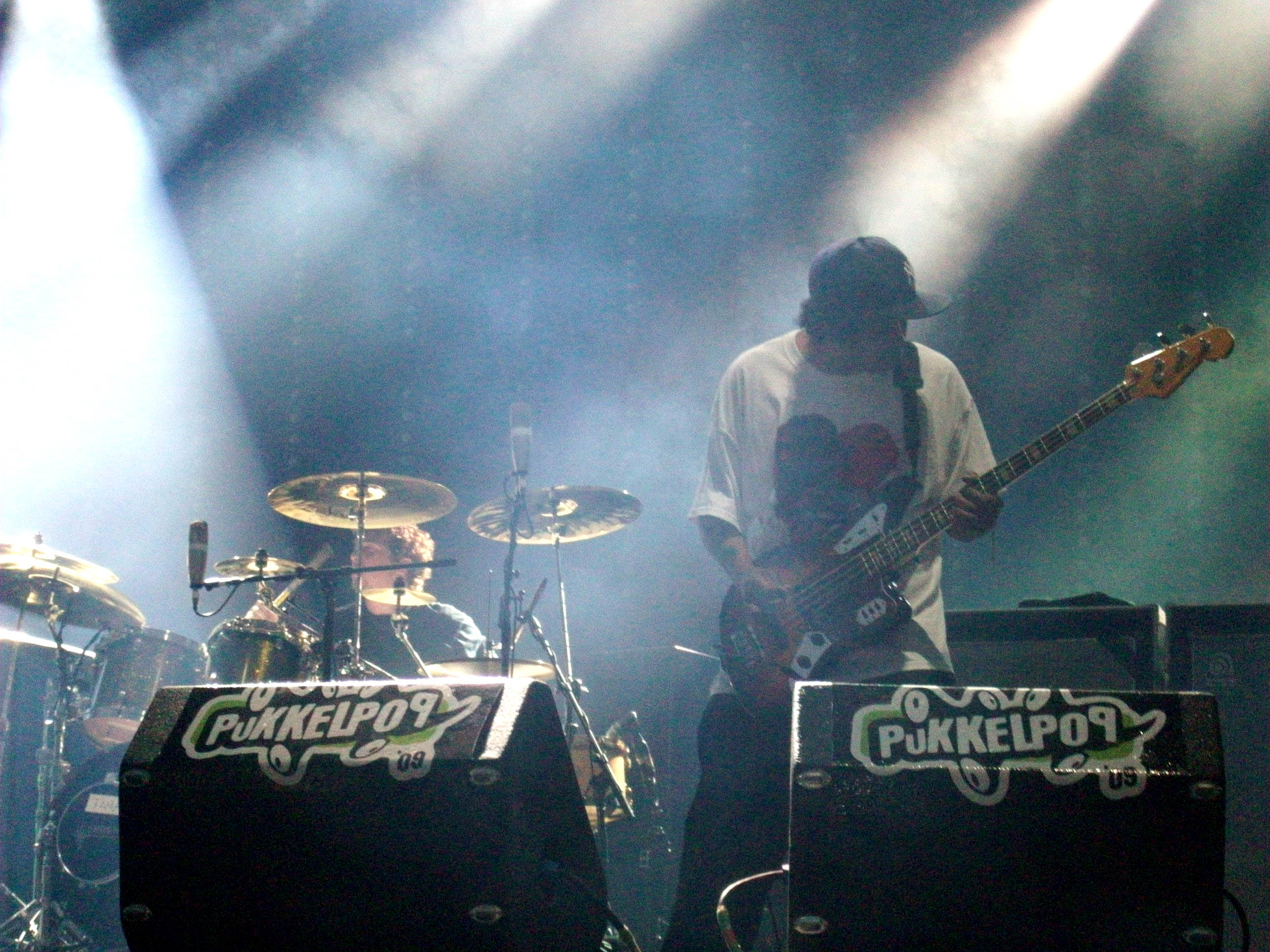
Deftones at Pukkelpop 2009

The festival returned in 2010 for its 25th anniversary, with Iron Maiden, Placebo, Queens of the Stone Age and Snow Patrol among the headlining acts. The 2010 edition was notable as the first ever Pukkelpop to have sold out its entire allotment of tickets, approximately five weeks prior to the commencement of the festival.

Logo in 2010 (25th anniversary)

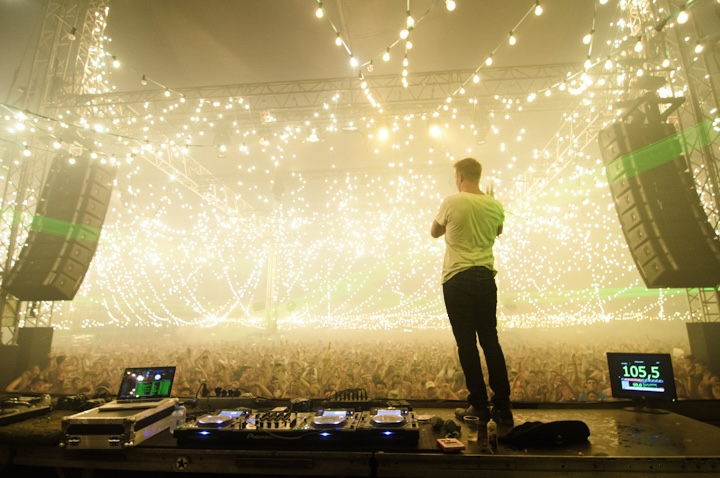
Diplo at Pukkelpop 2012

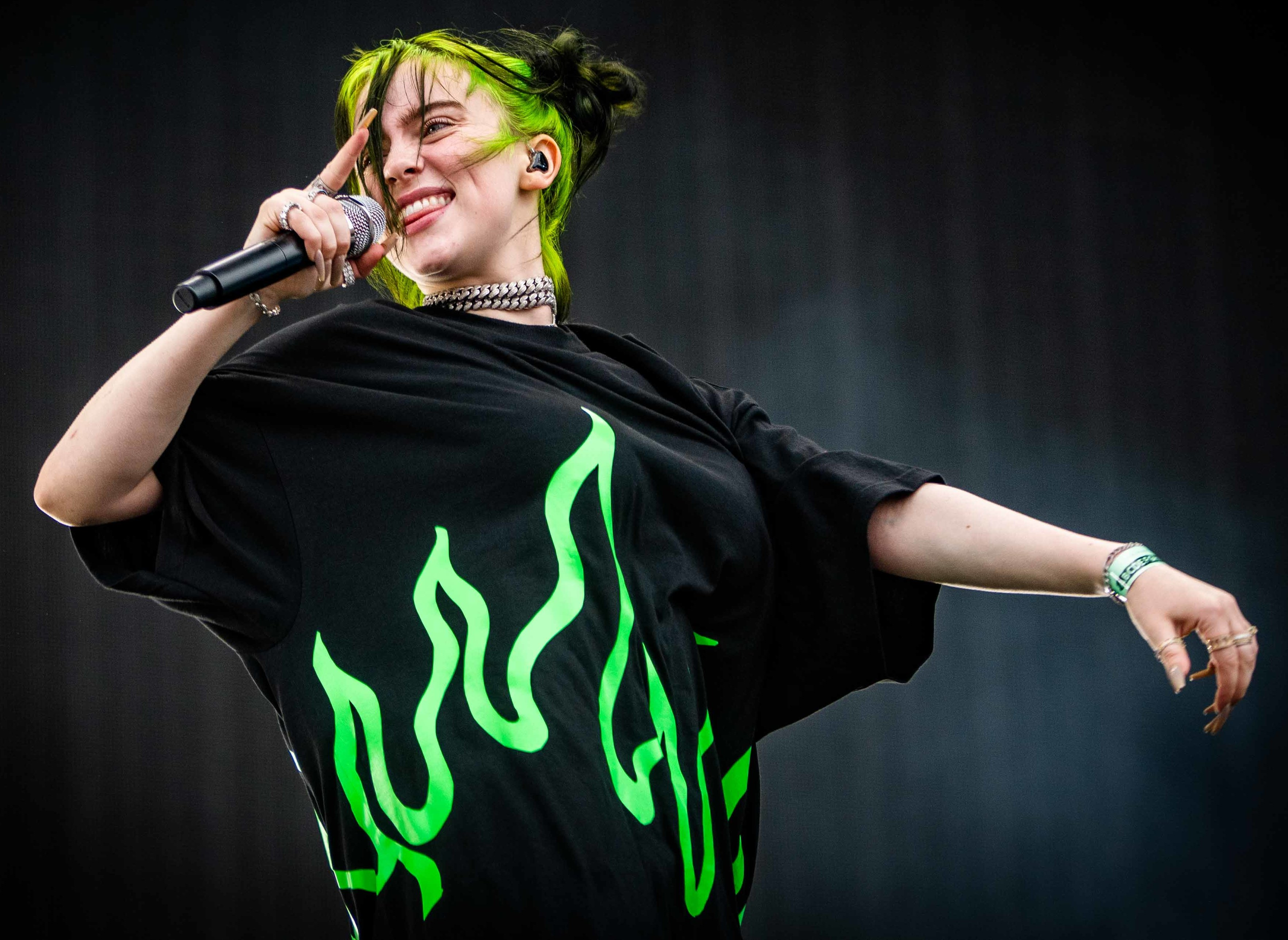
Billie Eilish performing at Pukkelpop 2019

The 2020 and 2021 editions had to be cancelled due to COVID-19 restrictions. The former was scheduled to take place on 21, 22 and 23 August 2020 with headline acts including Dua Lipa, Major Lazer, Travis Scott and The Weeknd, the latter on 19–22 August 2021 with headline acts such as Stormzy, The Hives, Editors, Liam Gallagher and Anne-Marie.

== Incidents ==
During the 2010 festival, two musicians died. Michael Been, lead singer and guitarist of The Call, died on 19 August of a heart attack after performing duties as sound engineer for Black Rebel Motorcycle Club. On 20 August Ou Est Le Swimming Pool singer Charles Haddon committed suicide by jumping from a telecommunications mast in the backstage parking area, shortly after the group's performance at the festival. Haddon was reported to be upset about an injury sustained by a fan after stage-diving into the crowd.

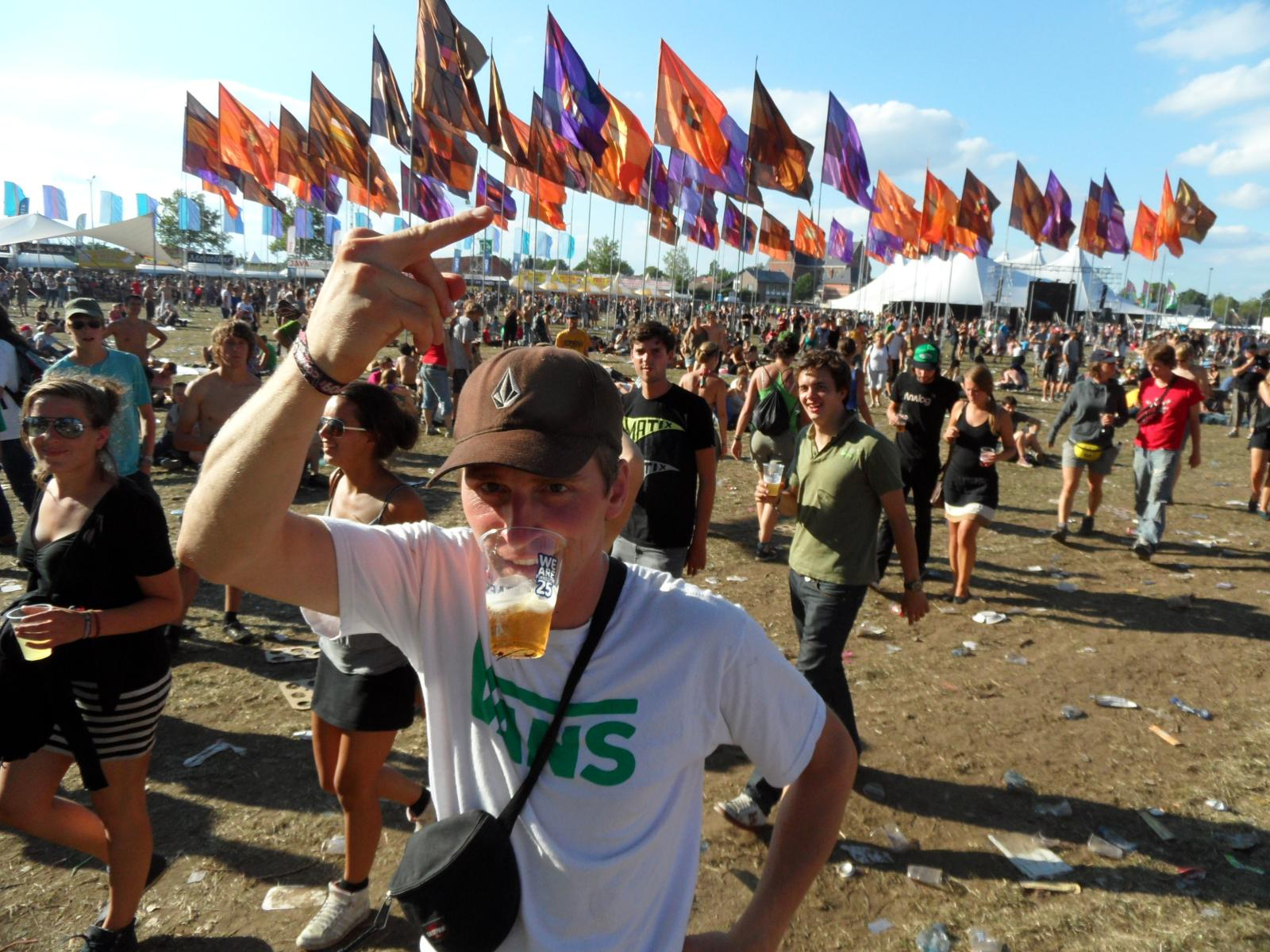
2010 Pukkelpop festival

The 2011 festival was affected by a severe thunderstorm during the evening of 18 August 2011, the opening day of the event. Torrential rain and strong winds toppled several concert tents, uprooted trees and knocked down festival light towers and video screens. The Chateau tent collapsed shortly after American rock band Smith Westerns began performing their set. Lead singer/guitarist Cullen Omori updated the band's Twitter account directly after the incident: "Stage collapsed max almost got crushed by trees, I hope pukkelpop has insurance bc all our shit is broke". The message was later removed. Five people were killed, and at least 140 were injured. The initial death toll was originally believed to be five, however this figure was later dropped to four; Belgian media have suggested that a man who died in a local hospital and did not attend the festival was erroneously counted as a reported death. Another victim died five days later in the hospital, which brought the death toll back to five. Following the storm, officials of the event announced that all music performances for the remainder of the night would be cancelled and that the festival would be put on hold "until we understand the situation completely". On 19 August 2011 the organisers decided to cancel the entire event. A statement read:

Pukkelpop is in deep mourning. We truly sympathise with the families and friends of the victims. Words are not enough. We have struggled with the decision to continue the festival. Therefore, we have decided to cancel Pukkelpop 2011. What has happened is very exceptional and could not have been predicted. We are deeply moved by all the spontaneous support the festival goers and the organisation have received.

The closest anemometer, in the town of Diepenbeek, recorded gusts above 80 km/h (50 mph), with reports of large hail and the possibility of a tornado. However, research done by specialists after the event, showed that the actual wind speed at the festival site reached 170 km/h (106 mph).

The 2011 festival was to have featured Eminem, Foo Fighters, The Offspring, dEUS and Thirty Seconds to Mars among the headlining acts. The incident came just five days after the Indiana State Fair stage collapse in the United States, which killed seven people and sparked debate about regulations in outdoor concert events.

== Camping and transport facilities ==
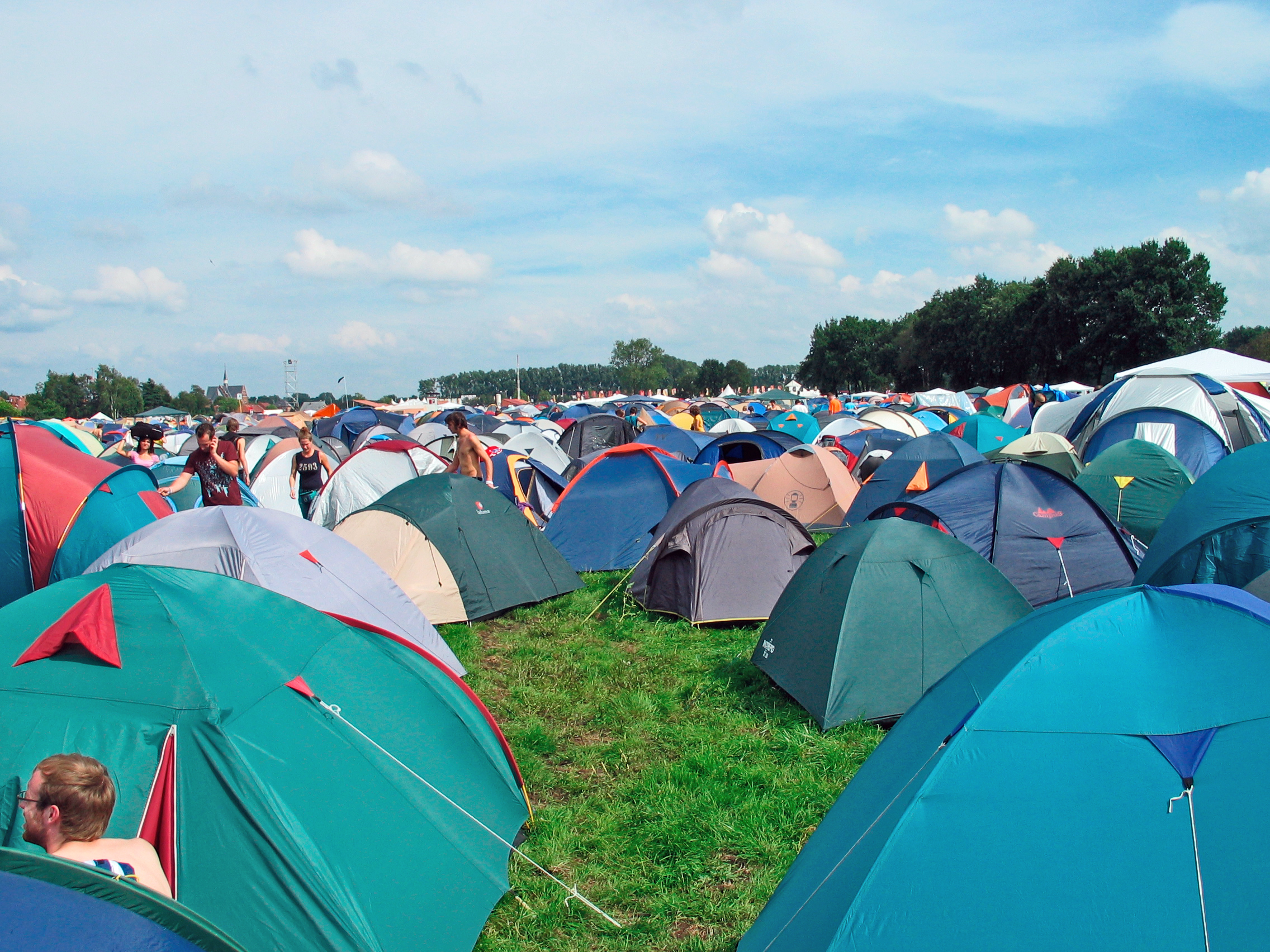
Tent camp of Pukkelpop in 2006

Pukkelpop provides camping facilities to attendees. The campsite lies on one side of Kempische Steenweg—with the main event grounds located directly on the other—and is opened on the day prior to the commencement of the event. Traffic guards are implemented in order to direct traffic and attendees during the festival period. To encourage use of public transport, an outward return trip within Belgium to Hasselt or Kiewit on the NMBS/SNCB train network or on the De Lijn bus network is included with all ticket types. A free shuttle bus, which runs regularly during the festival period, is also provided to-and-from Hasselt train station and the festival site in Kiewit. There are two ticket types available: day tickets, which provide access to one of the three days of the event, and "combi" tickets, which provide access to all three days of the festival.

== Polsslag ==
Logo for Polsslag 2009

Polsslag (Dutch term for "pulse" or "heartbeat") was a one-day annual music festival which took place in Hasselt in the spring of 2008 and 2009. The event, billed as Pukkelpop's sister festival, was held indoors at the Grenslandhallen in Hasselt. The festival featured four stages, the names of which are all retained from Pukkelpop: The Marquee, Dance Hall, Club and Boiler Room.

The first Polsslag event took place on 15 April 2008, featuring acts such as The Breeders, Millencolin and Boys Noize. In 2009, the festival ran on 2 May, with artists such as Dizzee Rascal and Yeah Yeah Yeahs performing.
