= Former aerodromes of Belgium =

| Nearest city | Name | ICAO code | Coordinates | Elevation | Activity period | Reference | Comment |
|---|---|---|---|---|---|---|---|
| Gent | Sint-Denijs-Westrem | EBGT | 51°1′39″N 03°41′21″E | 10 m (33 ft) | until 1985 | Nostalgia and photography | Was made the site of Flanders Expo, ICAO code now used for Ghent/Industry Zone Heliport |
| Zottegem | Oombergen | EBZO | | | | | ICAO code now used for Zonnebeke/Zandvoorde Heliport |
| | Beernem | | | | 1982-1997 | Article in Dutch | Glider |
| Aalst (Moorsel) | Ter Kluizen | | | | | | Not to be confused with Moorsel EBMO |
| Brussels (Haren) | Evere Airport | | | | | | |
| | Keerbergen | | | | 1932-1957 | Dutch language book reference | |
| Turnhout | Oud-Turnhout | EBOT | | | until 1999 | | |
| | Beerse | | | | | Article in Dutch | 800 m (2,600 ft) asphalt runway broken up 2009 |
| Knokke | Knokke-Zoute Airfield | | | | 1929-1960 | | |
| Nivelles | Nivelles airfield | | | | 1917-1962 | | Military |
| | Héron | EBHE | 50°32′50″N 5°6′30″E | 591 ft (180 m) | Last flight on 21 Nov. 2009 | ^{Aeronews of Belgium 37/2} | ULModrome closed 1 December 2009 |
| | Lierneux - Menil | EBLI | 50°17′12″N 5°50′11″E | | | | ULModrome closed 2009 |
| | Maasmechelen | EBMM | {{coord|50|46|35.2|N|5|36|46.1| | | | | ULModrome closed 2008 |
| Bouillon | Mogimont Airfield | EBBO | 49°52′00″N 005°04′06″E | 1,349 ft (411 m) | | | Closed circa 2009. |
| Bassenge | Wonck Airfield | EBBW | 50°46′35.2″N 5°36′46.1″E | 367 ft (112 m) | | | Closed circa 2006 |
