= SHAPE Pad =

Military helipad in Belgium

- IATA: none; ICAO: EBCH

Summary
- Airport type: Military
- Serves: Supreme Headquarters Allied Powers Europe
- Location: Mons, Belgium
- Elevation AMSL: 291 ft / 89 m
- Coordinates: 50°30.19′N 003°58.95′E

Map
- Location in Belgium

Helipads
Number	Length		Surface
Number	ft	m	Surface
	75x75	23 × 23	Concrete
- Source: DoD FLIP

SHAPE Pad (ICAO: EBCH) is a military helipad located in Mons, Belgium, serving Supreme Headquarters Allied Powers Europe (SHAPE). It is operated by the United States Air Force's 424th Air Base Squadron, stationed at Chièvres Air Base.

== See also ==
- List of airports in Belgium
