= Verviers-Theux Airfield =

Verviers-Theux Airfield Aérodrome de Verviers-Theux
- IATA: none; ICAO: EBTX

Summary
- Airport type: Private
- Operator: Royal Verviers Aviation ASBL
- Serves: Theux
- Location: Wallonia, Belgium
- Elevation AMSL: 1,099 ft / 335 m
- Coordinates: 50°33′09″N 005°51′18″E
- Website: www.verviers-aviation.be

Map
- Location in Belgium

Runways
Direction	Length		Surface
Direction	m	ft	Surface
06/24	732	2,402	Grass
- Sources: Belgian AIP

Verviers-Theux Airfield (French: Aérodrome de Verviers-Theux, ICAO: EBTX) is a public use airport located 3 km (2 mi) east-northeast of Theux, Liège, Wallonia, Belgium.

== See also ==
- List of airports in Belgium
