= Liernu Airfield =

- IATA: none; ICAO: EBLN

Summary
- Airport type: Private
- Operator: ULM Jonathan's Team
- Serves: Éghezée
- Location: Wallonia, Belgium
- Elevation AMSL: 564 ft / 172 m
- Coordinates: 50°34′47″N 004°47′32″E

Map
- Location in Belgium

Runways
Direction	Length		Surface
Direction	m	ft	Surface
07/25	150	492	Grass
- Sources: Belgian AIP

Liernu Airfield (ICAO: EBLN) was a recreational airfield located near Éghezée, Namur, Wallonia, Belgium. The runway was short and designed to accommodate only ultralight planes. The aerodrome closed in May 2023.

== See also ==
- List of airports in Belgium
