= Knokke-Heist/Westkapelle Heliport =

- IATA: none; ICAO: EBKW

Summary
- Airport type: Private
- Operator: Knokke Heliport NV
- Serves: Knokke-Heist
- Location: Westkapelle, Belgium
- Elevation AMSL: 10 ft / 3 m
- Coordinates: 51°19′18″N 003°17′40″E

Map
- Location in Belgium

Helipads
Number	Length		Surface
Number	m	ft	Surface
1	25	82	Grass
- Sources: Belgian AIP

Knokke-Heist/Westkapelle Heliport (ICAO: EBKW) is a public use airport located in Westkapelle, which is part of the municipality of Knokke-Heist in the province of West Flanders, Belgium.

== See also ==
- List of airports in Belgium
