= Orchimont Aerodrome =

Ultralight Airfield in Vresse-sur-Semois, Namur, Wallonia,Belgium

- IATA: none; ICAO: EBOR

Summary
- Airport type: Private
- Operator: Mr Lefèvre
- Serves: Vresse-sur-Semois
- Location: Wallonia, Belgium
- Elevation AMSL: 1,304 ft / 397 m
- Coordinates: 49°54′23″N 004°56′03″E

Map
- Location in Belgium

Runways
Direction	Length		Surface
Direction	m	ft	Surface
03/21	270	886	Grass
- Sources: Belgian AIP

Orchimont Aerodrome (ICAO: EBOR) is a recreational airfield located near Vresse-sur-Semois, Namur, Wallonia, Belgium. It only accepts ultralight aeroplanes.

== See also ==
- List of airports in Belgium
