= Zhenxing District =

Zhenxing 振兴区
- District
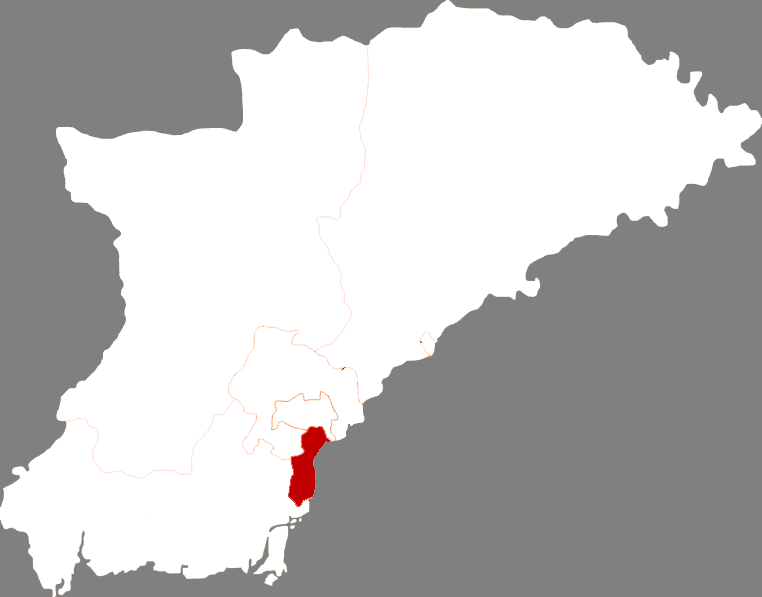
- Location in Dandong
- Country: China
- Province: Liaoning
- Prefecture-level city: Dandong
- District seat: Yongchang Subdistrict

Area
  - Total: 203.1 km^{2} (78.4 sq mi)

Population (2020 census)
  - Total: 423,538
  - Density: 2,085/km^{2} (5,401/sq mi)
- Time zone: UTC+8 (China Standard)
- Website: www.zhenxing.gov.cn

Zhenxing District (simplified Chinese: 振兴区; traditional Chinese: 振興區; pinyin: Zhènxīng Qū) is a district of the city of Dandong, Liaoning, China.

== Administrative divisions ==
There are 7 subdistricts and 3 towns in the district.

- Zhanqian Subdistrict (站前街道)
- Linjiang Subdistrict (临江街道)
- Maokuishan Subdistrict (帽盔山街道)
- Xianwei Subdistrict (纤维街道)
- Yongchang Subdistrict (永昌街道)
- Huayuan Subdistrict (花园街道)
- Jianghai Subdistrict (江海街道)
- Langtou Town (浪头镇)
- Anmin Town (安民镇)
- Tangchi (汤池镇)

== Education ==
Eaglebridge International School is in the district.
