= Overboelare Airfield =

Airport near Geraardsbergen, East Flanders, Belgium

Overboelare Airfield Vliegveld Overboelare
- IATA: none; ICAO: EBGG

Summary
- Airport type: Private
- Serves: Geraardsbergen
- Location: Belgium
- Elevation AMSL: 48 ft / 15 m
- Coordinates: 50°45′20″N 003°51′50″E

Map
- Location in Belgium

Runways
Direction	Length		Surface
Direction	m	ft	Surface
03/21	500	1,640	Grass
- Sources: Belgian AIP

Overboelare Airfield (Dutch: Vliegveld Overboelare, ICAO: EBGG) is a private use airport located near Geraardsbergen, East Flanders, Belgium.

== See also ==
- List of airports in Belgium
