= Elsenborn-Butgenbach Air Base =

- IATA: none; ICAO: EBLB

Summary
- Airport type: Military/Public
- Serves: Butgenbach
- Location: Wallonia, Belgium
- Elevation AMSL: 1,870 ft / 570 m
- Coordinates: 50°29′05″N 006°10′59″E

Map
- Location of Elsenborn-Butgenbach Air Base in Belgium

Runways
Direction	Length		Surface
Direction	m	ft	Surface
04/22	597	1,959	Asphalt
- Source: Landings.com

Elsenborn-Butgenbach Air Base (ICAO: EBLB) is a military aerodrome located 7 km (4 miles) north‑northwest of Butgenbach, Liège (province), Wallonia, Belgium.

== See also ==
- List of airports in Belgium
