= Zaffelare Heliport =

- IATA: none; ICAO: EBLZ

Summary
- Serves: Lochristi
- Location: Belgium
- Elevation AMSL: 10 ft / 3 m
- Coordinates: 51°07′50″N 003°51′51″E

Map
- Location in Belgium

Helipads
Number	Length		Surface
Number	m	ft	Surface
1	18	59	Grass
- Source: Landings.com

Zaffelare Heliport (ICAO: EBLZ) is an airport located near Lochristi, East Flanders, Belgium. It has 1 grass helipad.

== See also ==
- List of airports in Belgium
