= Büllingen Airfield =

- IATA: none; ICAO: EBBN

Summary
- Airport type: Private
- Operator: Aero und Modelclub "Feuervogel"
- Serves: Büllingen
- Location: Wallonia, Belgium
- Elevation AMSL: 2,059 ft / 628 m
- Coordinates: 50°24′54″N 006°16′35″E

Map
- Location in Belgium

Runways
Direction	Length		Surface
Direction	m	ft	Surface
12/30	350	1,148	Grass
- Sources: Belgian AIP

Büllingen Airfield (ICAO: EBBN) in Büllingen, is an ultralight aviation (ULM) airfield located in Liège, Wallonia, Belgium. Apart from ULM planes, it also hosts model ("R/C") flying. It is the only aerodrome in Belgium's German-speaking area. Like most recreational aerodromes in Belgium, its use is subject to prior permission from the operator.

== See also ==
- List of airports in Belgium
