= Zwartberg Airfield =

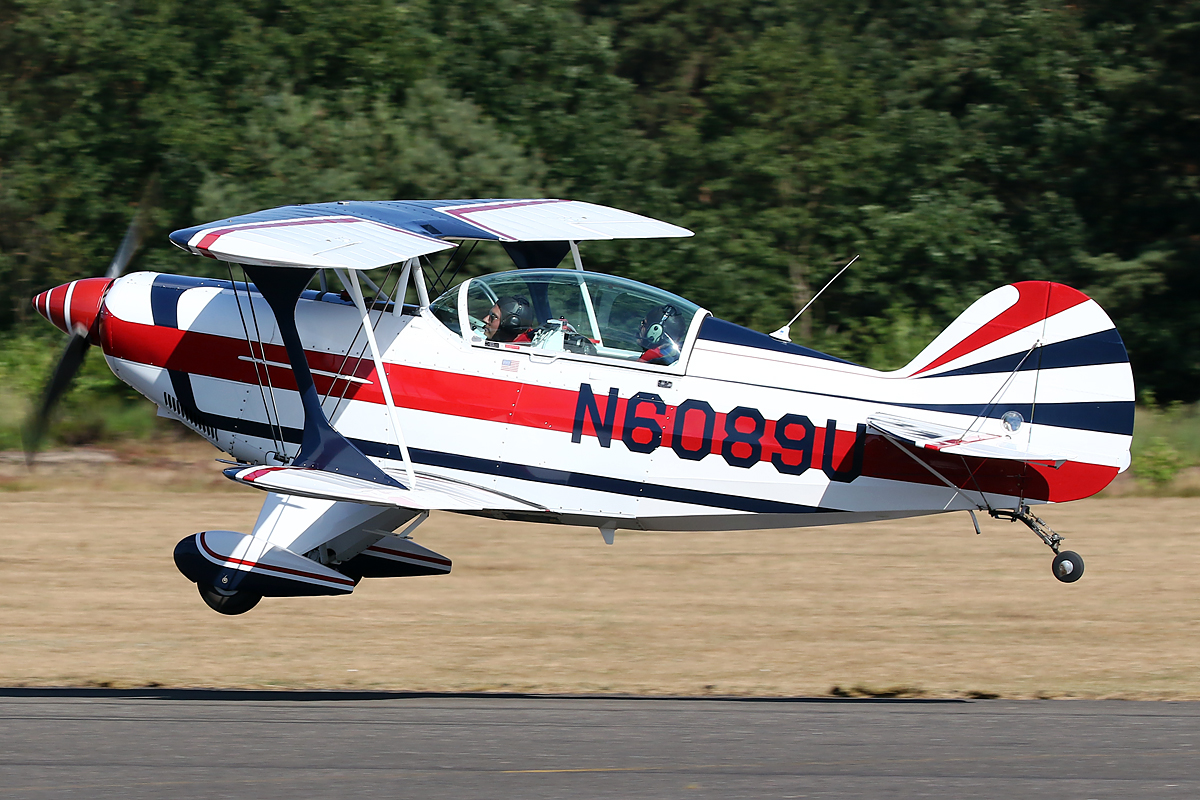
- A Pitts S-2 Special landing at Zwartberg Airfield in 2018.
- IATA: GNK; ICAO: EBZW

Summary
- Airport type: Public
- Serves: Genk
- Location: Belgium
- Elevation AMSL: 270 ft / 82 m
- Coordinates: 51°00′55″N 005°31′35″E

Map
- Location in Belgium

Runways
Direction	Length		Surface
Direction	m	ft	Surface
03L/21R	799	2,621	Asphalt
03R/21L	655	2,149	Grass
- Note: Runway 03R/21L has no ICAO markings. Sources: Belgian AIP

Zwartberg Airfield (IATA: GNK, ICAO: EBZW) is a public use airport located 6 km (4 miles) north-northeast of Genk, Limburg, Belgium. It was built in the 1950s.

== See also ==
- List of airports in Belgium
