= Oeren Heliport =

Oeren Heliport Veurne Heliport
- IATA: none; ICAO: EBVE

Summary
- Airport type: Private
- Operator: Restaurant-feestzaal Myosotis
- Serves: Veurne, West Flanders, Belgium
- Location: Oeren [nl], West Flanders, Belgium
- Elevation AMSL: 82 ft / 25 m
- Coordinates: 51°01′20″N 002°40′48″E

Map
- Location in Belgium

Helipads
| Number | Length | | Surface |
| Number | m | ft | Surface |
|---|---|---|---|
| 1 | 21 | 69 | Concrete/grass |
- Sources: Belgian AIP

Oeren Heliport (ICAO: EBVE) is a private heliport located near Veurne, West Flanders, Belgium. It is also known as Veurne Heliport.

== See also ==
- List of airports in Belgium
