= Arlon-Sterpenich Aerodrome =

Arlon Sterpenich Aerodrome
- IATA: none; ICAO: EBAR

Summary
- Airport type: Private
- Operator: Arel-Air ASBL
- Serves: Arlon
- Location: Wallonia, Belgium
- Elevation AMSL: 1,138 ft / 347 m
- Coordinates: 49°39′46″N 005°53′13″E
- Website: http://www.arelair.be

Map
- Location in Belgium

Runways
Direction	Length		Surface
Direction	m	ft	Surface
09/27	150	492	Grass
- Sources: Belgian AIP

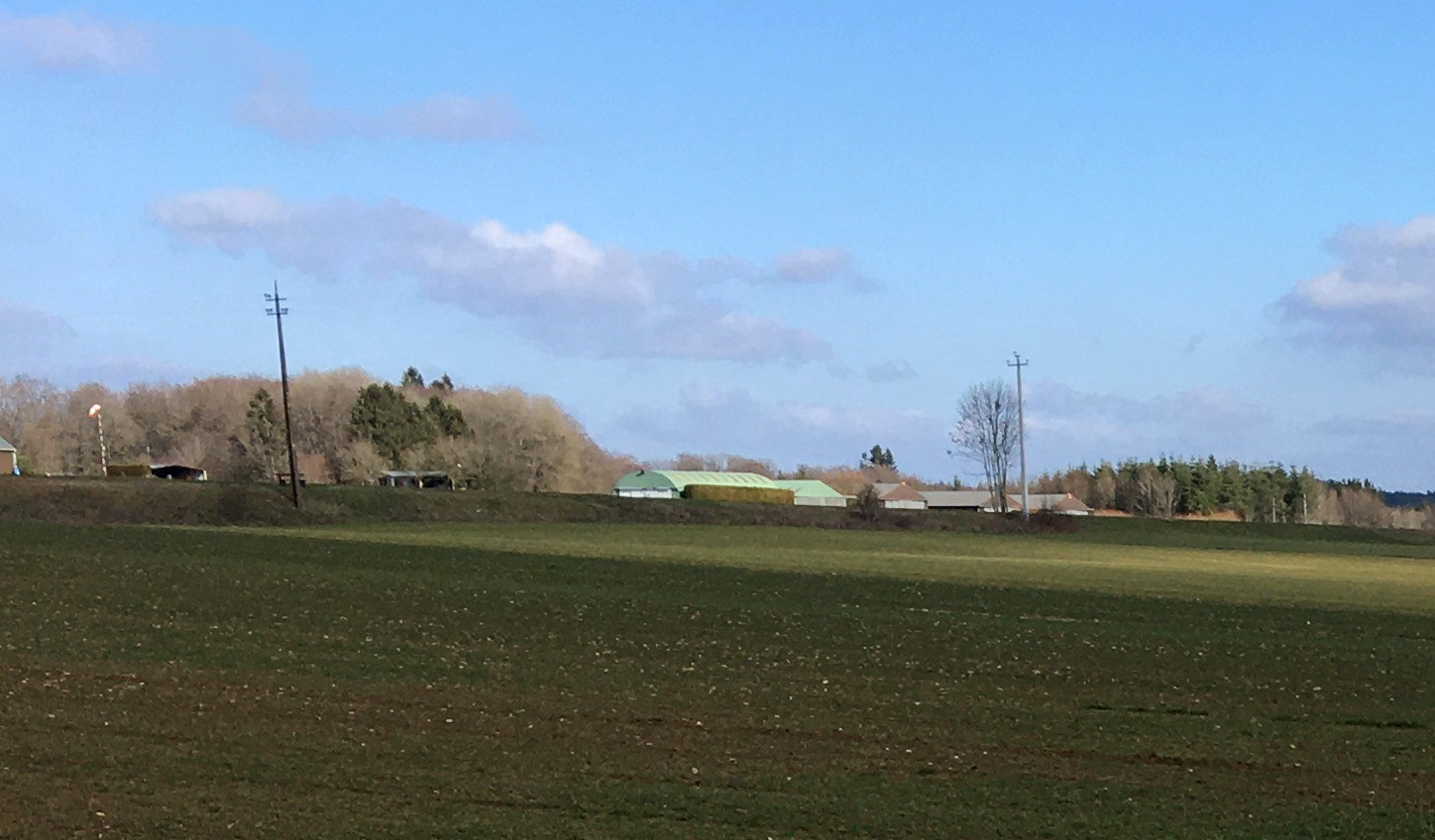
The airfield in 2021

Arlon Sterpenich Airfield (ICAO: EBAR) is a recreational aerodrome located east of Arlon, Belgian Luxembourg, Wallonia, Belgium, close to the border of the Grand Duchy of Luxembourg. Like most recreational airfields in Belgium, its use is subject to prior permission from the operator. Only ultralight aircraft are accepted.

== See also ==
- List of airports in Belgium
