= Veurne/Sint-Augustinus Heliport =

- IATA: none; ICAO: EBVS

Summary
- Airport type: Public
- Operator: AZ Sint-Augustinus Veurne
- Serves: Veurne
- Location: Belgium
- Elevation AMSL: 13 ft / 4 m
- Coordinates: 51°03′44″N 002°40′10″E

Map
- Location of Veurne/Sint-Augustinus Heliport in Belgium

Helipads
Number	Length		Surface
Number	m	ft	Surface
1	30	98	Asphalt
- Sources: Belgian AIP

Veurne/Sint-Augustinus Heliport (ICAO: EBVS) is a hospital heliport located near Veurne, West Flanders, Belgium.

== See also ==
- List of airports in Belgium
