= Cerfontaine Airfield =

- IATA: none; ICAO: EBCF

Summary
- Airport type: Private
- Serves: Cerfontaine
- Location: Wallonia, Belgium
- Elevation AMSL: 951 ft / 290 m
- Coordinates: 50°09′10″N 004°23′14″E

Map
- Location in Belgium

Runways
Direction	Length		Surface
Direction	m	ft	Surface
12L/30R	798	2,618	Grass
12R/30L	675	2,215	Grass
- Sources: Belgian AIP

Cerfontaine Airfield (ICAO: EBCF) is a private airfield located near Cerfontaine, Namur, Wallonia, Belgium. It took over most flying activity from the nearby Froidchapelle airfield when that closed.

== See also ==
- List of airports in Belgium
