= Diksmuide Heliport =

- IATA: none; ICAO: EBDI

Summary
- Airport type: Private
- Operator: Helihaven Diksmuide BVBA
- Serves: Diksmuide
- Location: Belgium
- Elevation AMSL: 16 ft / 5 m
- Coordinates: 51°01′04″N 002°51′25″E

Map
- Location in Belgium

Helipads
Number	Length		Surface
Number	m	ft	Surface
1	21	69	Grass
- Sources: Belgian AIP

Diksmuide Heliport (ICAO: EBDI) is a private heliport located near Diksmuide, West Flanders, Belgium.

== See also ==
- List of airports in Belgium
