= Baudour Heliport =

Airport in Saint-Ghislain, Belgium

- IATA: none; ICAO: EBBA

Summary
- Airport type: Private
- Operator: Epicura
- Serves: Douvrain
- Location: Wallonia, Belgium
- Elevation AMSL: 98 ft / 30 m
- Coordinates: 50°28′10″N 003°50′20″E

Map
- Location in Belgium

Helipads
Number	Length		Surface
Number	m	ft	Surface
1	20	66	Asphalt
- Sources: Belgian AIP

Baudour Heliport (ICAO: EBBA) is a hospital heliport located near Douvrain, in the Walloon municipality of Saint-Ghislain, Hainaut, Belgium.

== See also ==
- List of airports in Belgium
