= Maillen Airfield =

- IATA: none; ICAO: EBML

Summary
- Airport type: Private
- Operator: Loisir Club Mosan
- Serves: Assesse, Wallonia, Belgium
- Location: Maillen
- Elevation AMSL: 878 ft / 268 m
- Coordinates: 50°22′27″N 004°55′40″E

Map
- Location in Belgium

Runways
Direction	Length		Surface
Direction	m	ft	Surface
09/27	400	1,312	Grass
- Sources: Belgian AIP

Maillen Airfield (ICAO: EBML), located near Assesse, Namur (province), Wallonia, Belgium, accepts only (European style) ultralights.

The airfield's elevation is 878 feet (268 m) and it has a grass runway designated 09/27 which measures 400 by 30 metres (1,312 ft × 98 ft).

== See also ==
- List of airports in Belgium
