= Sint-Lucas Hospital Heliport =

- IATA: none; ICAO: EBSS

Summary
- Airport type: Private
- Serves: Bruges
- Location: Belgium
- Elevation AMSL: 16 ft / 5 m
- Coordinates: 51°11′03″N 003°15′00″E

Map
- Location in Belgium

Helipads
Number	Length		Surface
Number	m	ft	Surface
1	21	69	Asphalt
- Sources: Belgian AIP

Sint-Lucas Hospital Heliport (ICAO: EBSS) is a hospital heliport located near Bruges, West Flanders, Belgium.

== See also ==
- List of airports in Belgium
