= Brasschaat Airfield =

Former military, currently civilian airfield in Belgium

Brasschaat Airfield Vliegveld Brasschaat
- IATA: none; ICAO: EBBT

Summary
- Airport type: Public
- Operator: Koninklijke Aeroclub van Brasschaat
- Serves: Brasschaat
- Location: Belgium
- Elevation AMSL: 68 ft / 21 m
- Coordinates: 51°20′27″N 004°30′15″E

Map
- Location in Belgium

Runways
Direction	Length		Surface
Direction	m	ft	Surface
16/34	799	2,621	Asphalt
- Sources: Belgian AIP

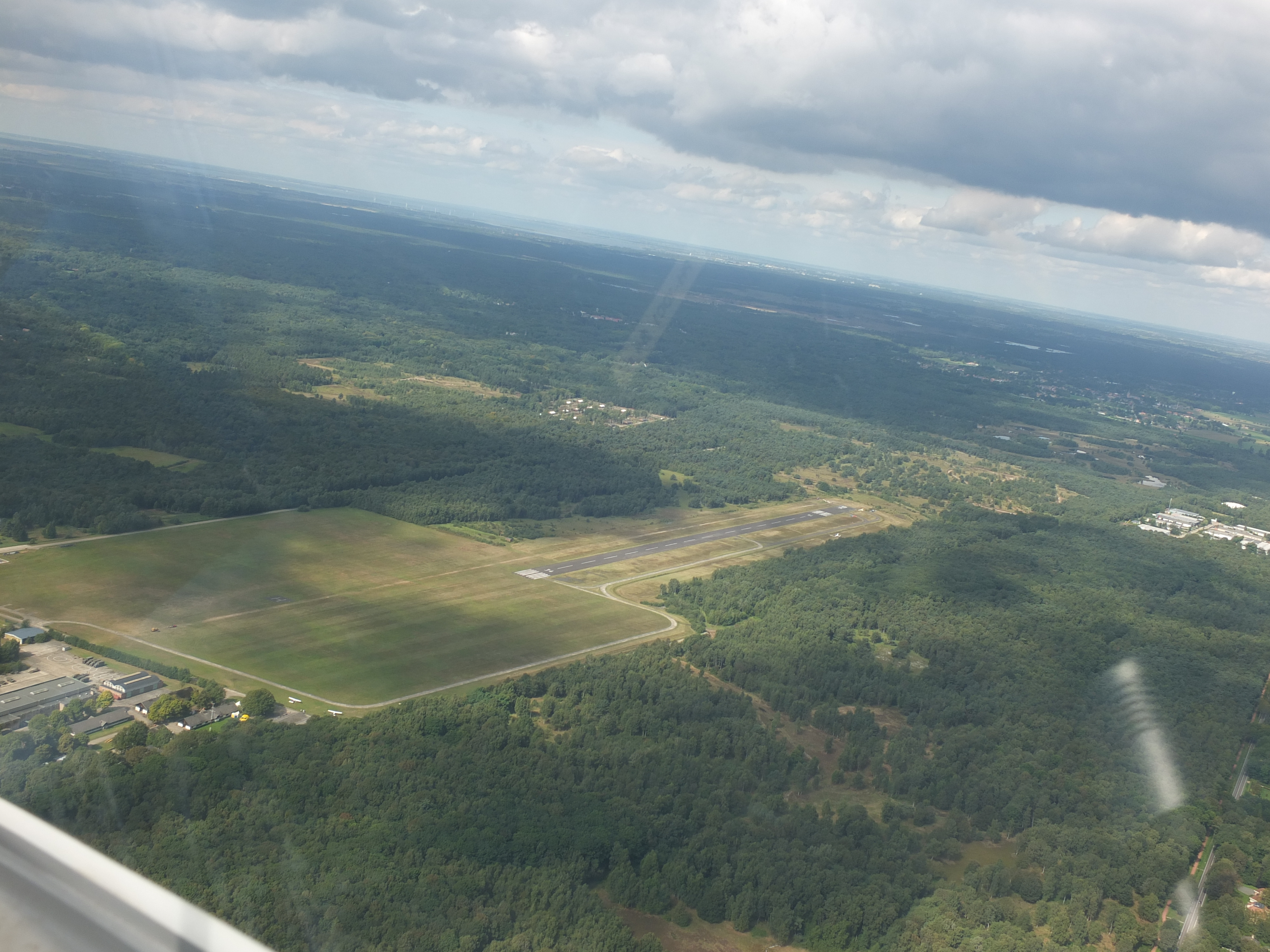

Brasschaat Airfield (Dutch: Vliegveld Brasschaat, (ICAO: EBBT)) is an airfield located 4 km (2 miles) north of Brasschaat, Antwerp, Belgium. Formerly the base of the Belgian Army Flying Service, it is today home to recreational flying, including gliders and microlights.

== See also ==
- List of airports in Belgium
