= Avernas-le-Bauduin Airfield =

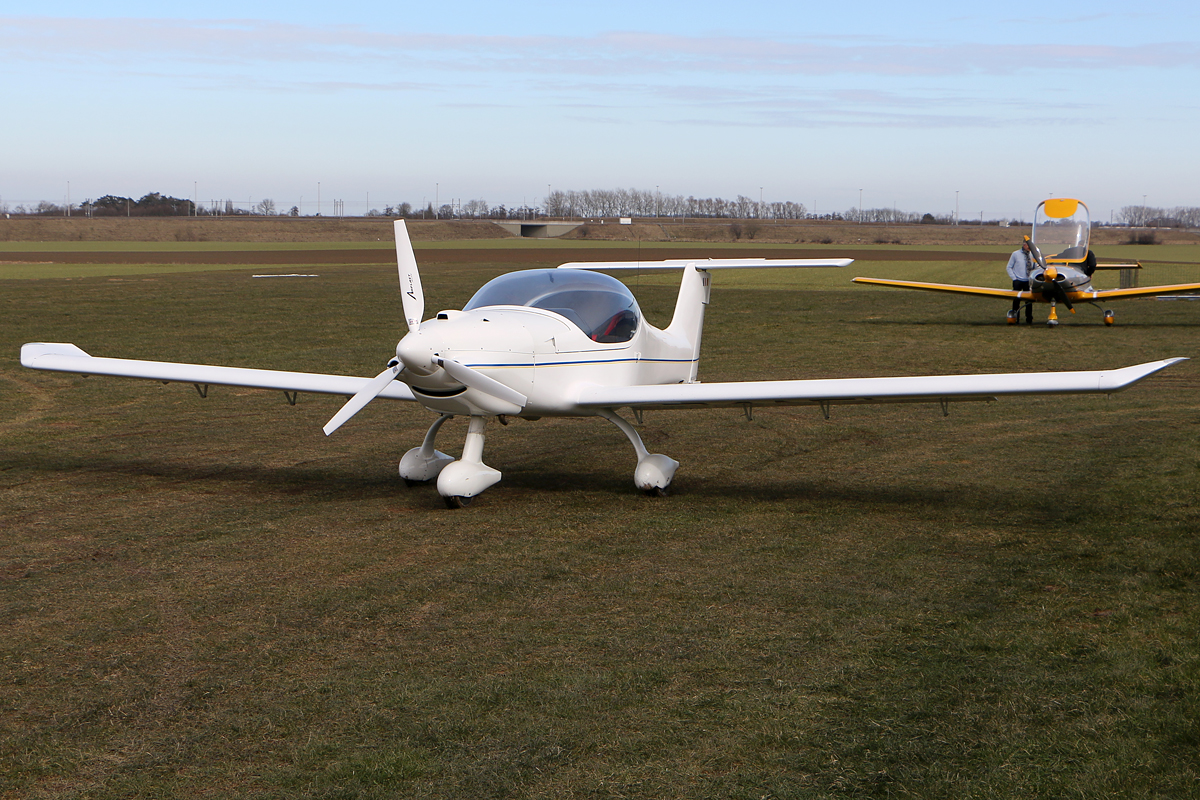
- A Dyn'Aéro MCR01 at Avernas-le-Bauduin in 2018.
- IATA: none; ICAO: EBAV

Summary
- Airport type: Public
- Operator: Aéro Club de Hesbaye ASBL
- Serves: Hannut
- Location: Wallonia, Belgium
- Elevation AMSL: 386 ft / 118 m
- Coordinates: 50°42′24″N 005°04′05″E

Map
- Location in Belgium

Runways
Direction	Length		Surface
Direction	m	ft	Surface
05/23	399	1,309	Grass
- Sources: Belgian AIP

Avernas-le-Bauduin Airfield (ICAO: EBAV) is a club aerodrome located near Hannut, Liège (province), Wallonia, Belgium. It only serves ULM planes, many of which are based there.

== See also ==
- List of airports in Belgium
