= Zingem Heliport =

- IATA: none; ICAO: EBZI

Summary
- Airport type: Private
- Operator: Vande Kerckhove
- Serves: Zingem
- Location: Belgium
- Elevation AMSL: 30 ft / 9 m
- Coordinates: 50°55′35″N 003°37′02″E

Map
- Location in Belgium

Helipads
Number	Length		Surface
Number	m	ft	Surface
1	21	69	Grass
- Sources: Belgian AIP

Zingem Heliport (ICAO: EBZI) is a private heliport located near Zingem, East Flanders, Belgium.

== See also ==
- List of airports in Belgium
