= Mogimont Airfield =

Former airfield in Wallonia, Belgium

- IATA: none; ICAO: ~~EBBO~~

Summary
- Airport type: Public
- Serves: Bouillon
- Location: Wallonia, Belgium
- Elevation AMSL: 1,394 ft (425 m)
- Coordinates: 49°52′00″N 005°04′06″E

Map
- Location in Belgium

Runways
Direction	Length		Surface
Direction	m	ft	Surface
~~09/27~~	~~232~~	~~760~~	~~Grass~~
- Source: Landings.com

Mogimont Airfield ~~(ICAO: EBBO)~~ was a public use aerodrome located near Bouillon, Luxembourg, Wallonia, Belgium. It was used only for ultralights, before it closed circa 2009.

== See also ==
- List of airports in Belgium
