= Ghent/Industry Zone Heliport =

Ghent/Industry Zone Heliport Ghent University Hospital Heliport
- IATA: none; ICAO: EBGT

Summary
- Airport type: Private
- Operator: Universitair Ziekenhuis Gent
- Serves: Ghent
- Location: Belgium
- Elevation AMSL: 26 ft / 8 m
- Coordinates: 51°01′14″N 003°43′49″E

Map
- Location in Belgium

Helipads
Number	Length		Surface
Number	m	ft	Surface
1	24	79	Concrete
- Sources: Belgian AIP

Ghent/Industry Zone Heliport (ICAO: EBGT) is a heliport serving Ghent University Hospital located near Ghent, East Flanders, Belgium.

== See also ==
- List of airports in Belgium
