= Leopoldsburg/Beverlo Airfield =

Leopoldsburg/Beverlo Airfield Aeroclub Sanicole VZW
- IATA: none; ICAO: EBLE

Summary
- Airport type: Private
- Operator: Aeroclub Sanicole
- Serves: Leopoldsburg
- Location: Belgium
- Elevation AMSL: 207 ft / 63 m
- Coordinates: 51°07′12″N 005°18′26″E

Map
- Location in Belgium

Runways
Direction	Length		Surface
Direction	m	ft	Surface
08/26	600	1,969	Asphalt
- Sources: Belgian AIP

Leopoldsburg/Beverlo Airfield (ICAO: EBLE) was originally a military airfield on the grounds of a big military base. It had long permitted civilian use, hosting an aeroclub and several private aircraft owners. The military no longer having any use for it, it was turned over to civilian usage in 2017. It is located near Leopoldsburg, Limburg, Belgium. It is sometimes known by the name of its operator, the aeroclub Sanicole. It yearly hosts a reputed airshow, and also a European meeting/fly-in of builders/owners of experimental and/or historic aeroplanes.

== See also ==
- List of airports in Belgium
