= Kiewit Airfield =

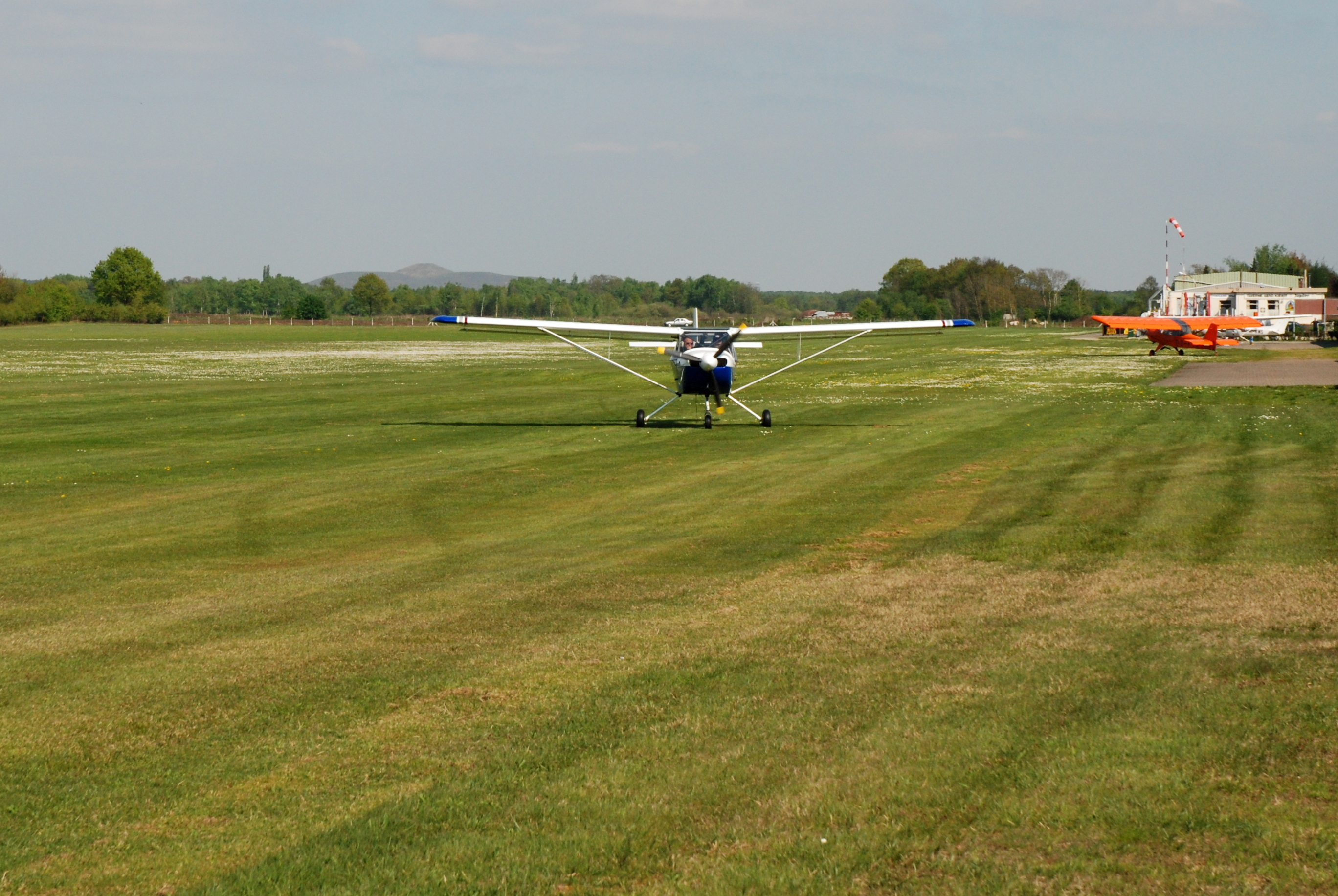
- IATA: none; ICAO: EBZH

Summary
- Airport type: Private
- Operator: Aeroclub Kiewit
- Serves: Hasselt
- Location: Belgium
- Opened: May 15, 1910
- Elevation AMSL: 133 ft / 41 m
- Coordinates: 50°58′12″N 005°22′30″E
- Website: www.aero-kiewit.be

Map
- Location in Belgium

Runways
| Direction | Length | | Surface |
| Direction | m | ft | Surface |
|---|---|---|---|
| 09/27 | 600 | 1,969 | Grass |
- Sources: Belgian AIP

Kiewit Airfield (ICAO: EBZH) is a recreational airfield located near Hasselt, Limburg, Belgium. It has a single grass runway of 600 m length. It is operated by Aeroclub Kiewit. There is mixed activity of airplanes and gliders.

It is also home to gliding club Albatros.

== History ==
The field was first identified as a good location for aviation activities by Alfred Lanser in 1909. At the time, it was 8 km long and 3 km wide.

After Aero Club Liège Spa signed a deal with the owner of the field, it was inaugurated on May 15, 1910. It became the first public airport in Belgium. Later that year, it was subrented to the ministry of War which used it for training, making it the first military airfield in Belgium.

After World War I, the field was used for artillery shooting exercises. Aviation activities resumed in 1933, led by the newly formed Limburg Aviation Club.

During World War II, the field was used as a decoy airfield by German occupiers. After the war, there were several attempts to restart flying activities. In 1969, flying club Aero-Kiewit was founded and flying activities gradually resumed. In 1973, they were joined by the glider club Albatros.

== See also ==
- List of airports in Belgium
