= Eaglebridge International School =

International school in Dandong, China

Eaglebridge International School 丹东鹰桥国际学校 丹東鷹橋國際學校

Information
- School type: International Boarding School
- Established: 2012
- Grades: K-12

Eaglebridge International School (EBIS; simplified Chinese: 丹东鹰桥国际学校; traditional Chinese: 丹東鷹橋國際學校; pinyin: Dāndōng Yīngqiáo Guójì Xuéxiào) is an international school in Zhenxing District, Dandong, China. It includes grades kindergarten through high school.

== History ==
It was founded in Dandong by Adventists from the United States for K-12 international students. It opened in October 2012, at the same time as the New Yalu River Bridge was planned, a major bridge connecting Dandong and Sinuiju, North Korea.

In 2016, the school had 200 students, including about 50 North Koreans, which was less than the original projection of 300 students. China - North Korean relations had deteriorated by that point, and the bridge's construction had not been completed.

== Campus ==
Secondary and elementary students can board at the school; secondary students live in rooms with two or four other students, while elementary students live in house-like environments.
