= Ath/Isières Airfield =

- IATA: none; ICAO: EBIS

Summary
- Airport type: Private
- Operator: Ulmath ASBL
- Serves: Ath
- Location: Wallonia, Belgium
- Elevation AMSL: 90 ft / 27 m
- Coordinates: 50°39′51″N 003°48′16″E

Map
- Location in Belgium

Runways
Direction	Length		Surface
Direction	m	ft	Surface
17/35	151	495	Grass
- Sources: Belgian AIP

Ath/Isières Airfield (ICAO: EBIS) is a private ultralight aviation field, located near the Walloon city of Ath, Hainaut, Belgium. Like most small aerodromes in Belgium it welcomes visitors, but prior permission is legally required.

== See also ==
- List of airports in Belgium
