= Saint-Hubert Air Base =

Saint-Hubert Air Base Base aérienne de Saint-Hubert
- IATA: none; ICAO: EBSU

Summary
- Airport type: Military
- Location: Saint-Hubert, Wallonia, Belgium
- Elevation AMSL: 1,930 ft / 588 m
- Coordinates: 50°02′03″N 005°26′24″E

Map
- Location of Saint-Hubert Air Base

Runways
Direction	Length		Surface
Direction	m	ft	Surface
07/25	2,600	8,530	Concrete/Asphalt
- Sources: Belgian AIP

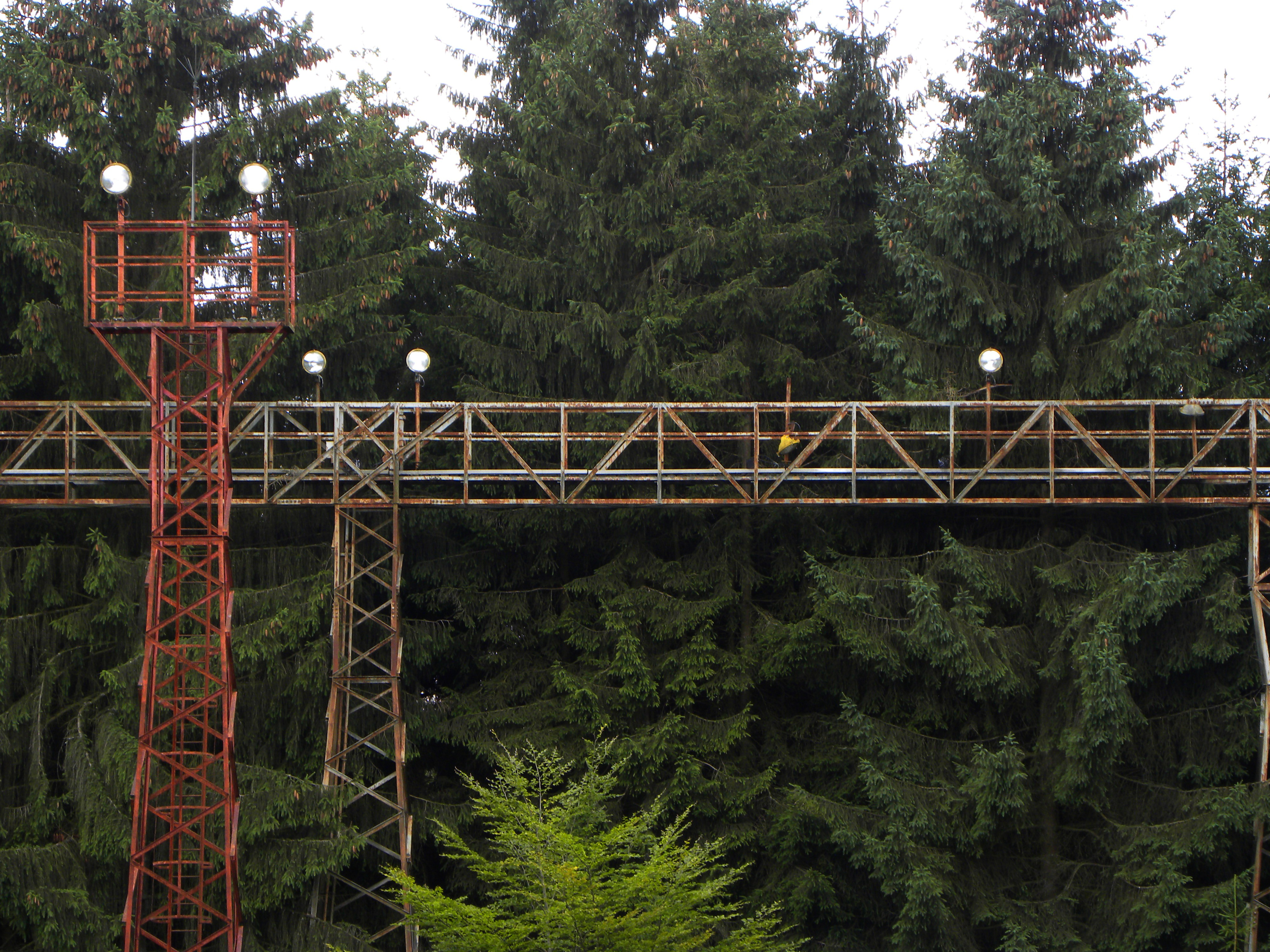

Saint-Hubert Air Base (French: Base aérienne de Saint-Hubert, (ICAO: EBSU)) is a military aerodrome located northeast of Saint-Hubert, a municipality in the province of Luxembourg in Wallonia (southern Belgium). It is not in active use.

The base is southeast of the Saint-Hubert Airfield (Aérodrome de Saint-Hubert) (ICAO: EBSH), which is located at 50°02′09″N 005°24′15″E.
