= Kuurne =

- Municipality
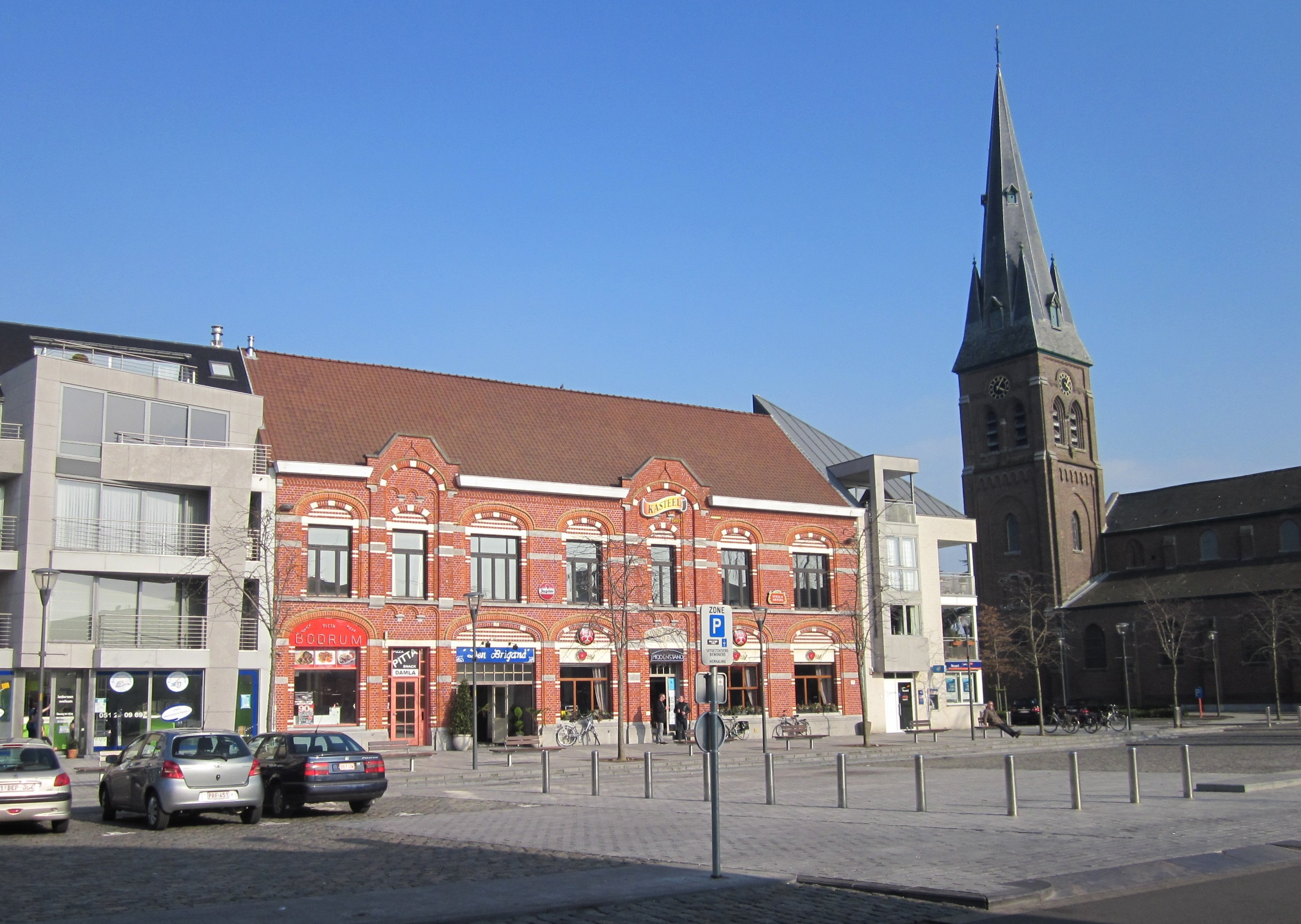

- Flag Coat of arms

- Location of Kuurne in West-Flanders
- Interactive map of Kuurne
- Location in Belgium
- Coordinates: 50°51′N 03°17′E
- Country: Belgium
- Community: Flemish Community
- Region: Flemish Region
- Province: West Flanders
- Arrondissement: Kortrijk

Government
  - Mayor: Francis Benoit (CD&V)
  - Governing parties: CD&V, N-VA, Vooruit-Groen

Area
  - Total: 10.11 km^{2} (3.90 sq mi)

Population (2018-01-01)
  - Total: 13,318
  - Density: 1,317/km^{2} (3,412/sq mi)
- Postal codes: 8520
- NIS code: 34023
- Area codes: 056
- Website: www.kuurne.be

Kuurne (Dutch pronunciation: [ˈkyːrnə]) is a municipality located in the Belgian province of West Flanders. The municipality comprises only the town of Kuurne proper. On January 1, 2006, Kuurne had a total population of 12,591. The total area is 10.01 km^{2} which gives a population density of 1258 inhabitants per km^{2}. The Leie functions as a natural border between Kuurne and Harelbeke.

Inhabitants from Kuurne are nicknamed 'donkeys'. This is said to be a term of derision given to them by the people of nearby Kortrijk because traders from Kuurne habitually set off for the Kortrijk market at an early hour, their ass-drawn carts laden with vegetables. Awoken by the rattle of the cart wheels and the braying of the asses, the people of Kortrijk exclaimed: "It's those asses from Kuurne again!"

An alternative, more legendary explanation originates from the tale of a priest who had to hold a funeral on Ash Wednesday. He asked the sacrister to take over his regular service, but the latter couldn't remember the Latin words "Memento, homo, quia pulvis es, et in pulverem reverteris" (Remember, man, that dust thou art, and unto dust thou shalt return), which are to be proclaimed while applying a cross of ash to the foreheads of the churchgoers. Later the priest spoke to him in exasperation, saying: "You were born an ass, and you will die an ass!" "Aha," said the sacrister, "I'll remember that!" and so saying, he continued giving the people of Kuurne their crosses of ash.

The best-known donkey in Kuurne is 'Ambroos' (Ambrose), a larger-than-life and somewhat stylised statue in front of the town hall. The winner of the annual pro road cycling race Kuurne–Brussels–Kuurne received a big bouquet and a soft toy version of 'Ambroos' to wave from the stage.

At 50.87257 N 3.26302 E, there was a mediumwave transmitter of BRT, which worked on 1188 kHz with a power of 5 kW.

== Twin towns ==
- Kuressaare, Estonia (1998)
- Chiuza, Romania (1999)
- (France) Marcq-en-Baroeul (1945)
