= Zuienkerke =

- Municipality
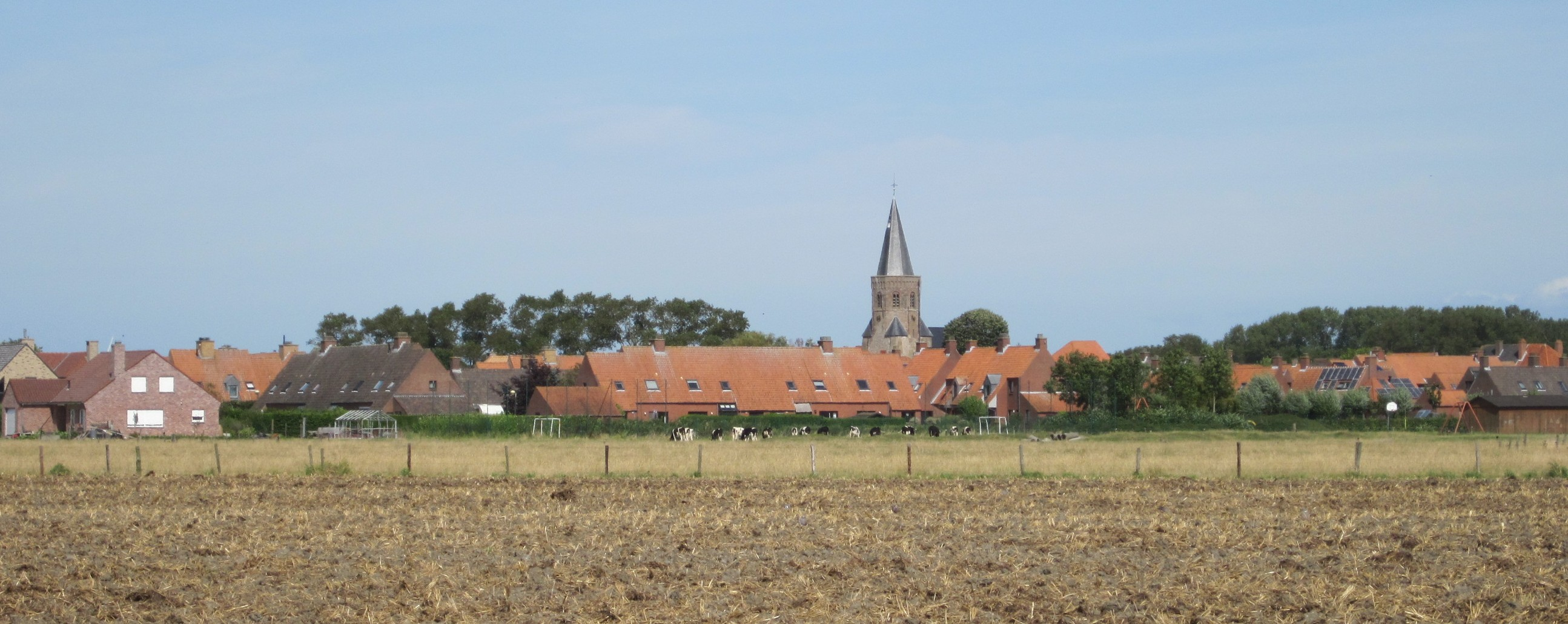

- Flag Coat of arms

- Location of Zuienkerke in West Flanders
- Interactive map of Zuienkerke
- Location in Belgium
- Coordinates: 51°15′N 03°09′E
- Country: Belgium
- Community: Flemish Community
- Region: Flemish Region
- Province: West Flanders
- Arrondissement: Bruges

Government
  - Mayor: Alain De Vlieghe
  - Governing party: LB

Area
  - Total: 48.9 km^{2} (18.9 sq mi)

Population (2018-01-01)
  - Total: 2,730
  - Density: 55.8/km^{2} (145/sq mi)
- Postal codes: 8377
- NIS code: 31042
- Area codes: 050
- Website: www.zuienkerke.be

Zuienkerke (Dutch pronunciation: [ˈzœyə(ŋ)kɛrkə]; West Flemish: Zuunkerke [ˈzyŋkærkə]; French: Zuyenkerque) is a municipality located in the Belgian province of West Flanders. The municipality comprises the towns of Houtave, Meetkerke, Nieuwmunster and Zuienkerke proper. On January 1, 2006, Zuienkerke had a total population of 2,776. The total area is 48.86 km^{2} which gives a population density of 57 inhabitants per km^{2}.
