= Château de Saint-Hubert =

Royal château in Yvelines, France

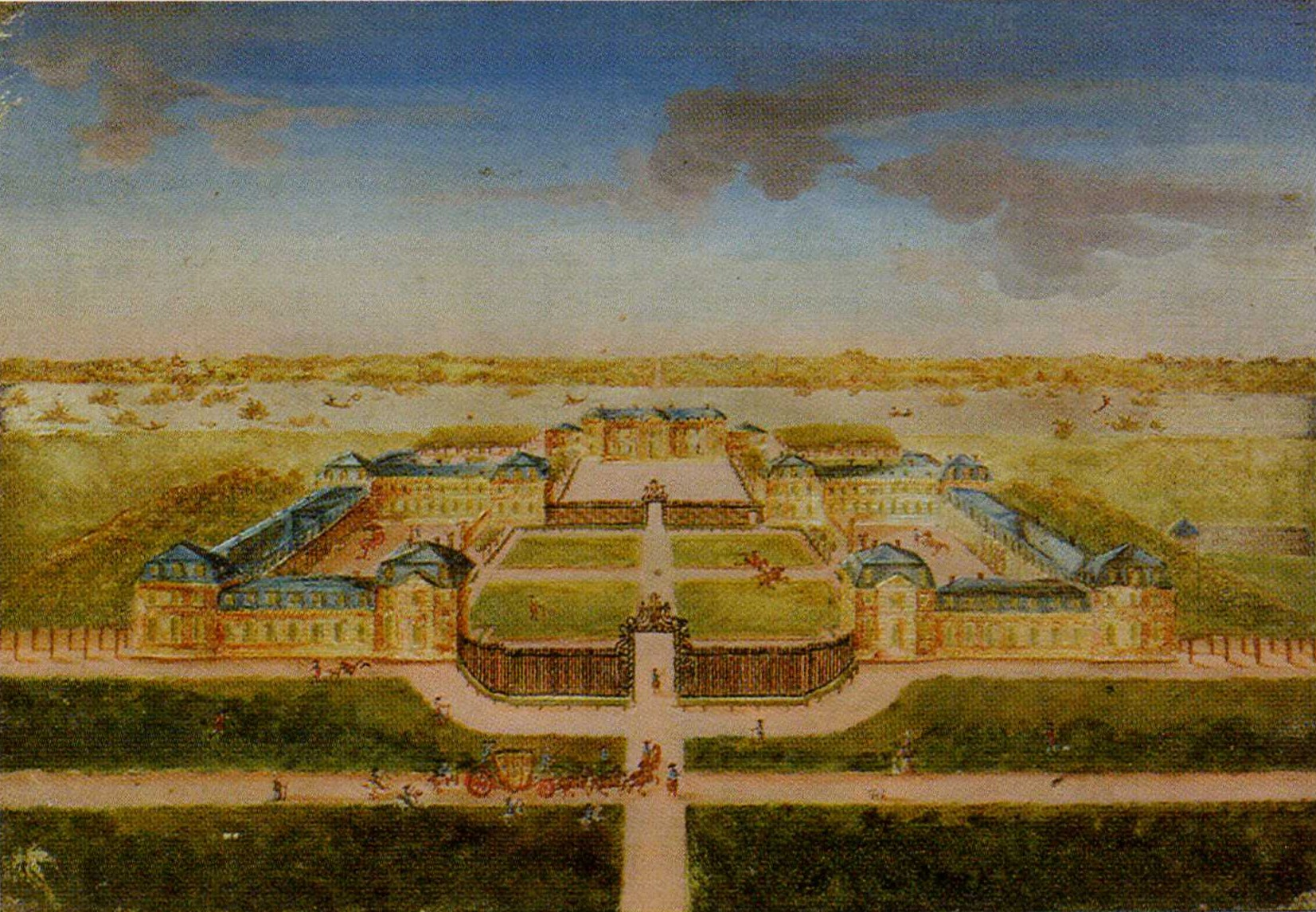
- View of the Château de Saint-Hubert

- Location within Île-de-France (region)

General information
- Status: Destroyed
- Architectural style: Neoclassical
- Location: Le Perray-en-Yvelines
- Coordinates: 48.714727°N 1.850621°E
- Construction started: 1755
- Owner: Louis XV

Design and construction
- Architect: Ange-Jacques Gabriel

The Château de Saint-Hubert was a royal château built by order of Louis XV in Perray-in-Yvelines (now in the department of Yvelines), for use while he was hunting in the nearby forest (Saint Hubert is the patron saint of hunters). The design was entrusted to Ange-Jacques Gabriel, designer of the École Militaire, and the building was under construction from 1755 to 1758.

Saint-Hubert was originally intended as a simple hunting lodge, to allow the King to rest during and after the hunt without calling on his cousin, Louis Jean Marie de Bourbon, Duke of Penthièvre. Work was not completed by 1756, and it was decided to turn Saint-Hubert into a full château, with a main building housing 25 nobles, plus two projecting service wings and a gatehouse creating a courtyard. The main room was elaborately decorated with painted stucco.

The building was still not completed by the death of Louis XV, and Louis XVI abandoned it as too expensive. Instead, he bought the Château de Rambouillet from the Duke of Penthièvre. Saint-Hubert then fell into disrepair and was demolished in 1855. Little remains today.

Louis XV had planned a model village around the Château de Saint-Hubert, but it also was never completed.

A painting by Charles-André van Loo ordered in 1758 for the chapel at Saint-Hubert, The conversion of Saint-Hubert is now housed in the église Saint-Lubin-et-Saint-Jean in Rambouillet.
