= Reninge =

Coordinates: 50°57′N 2°47′E

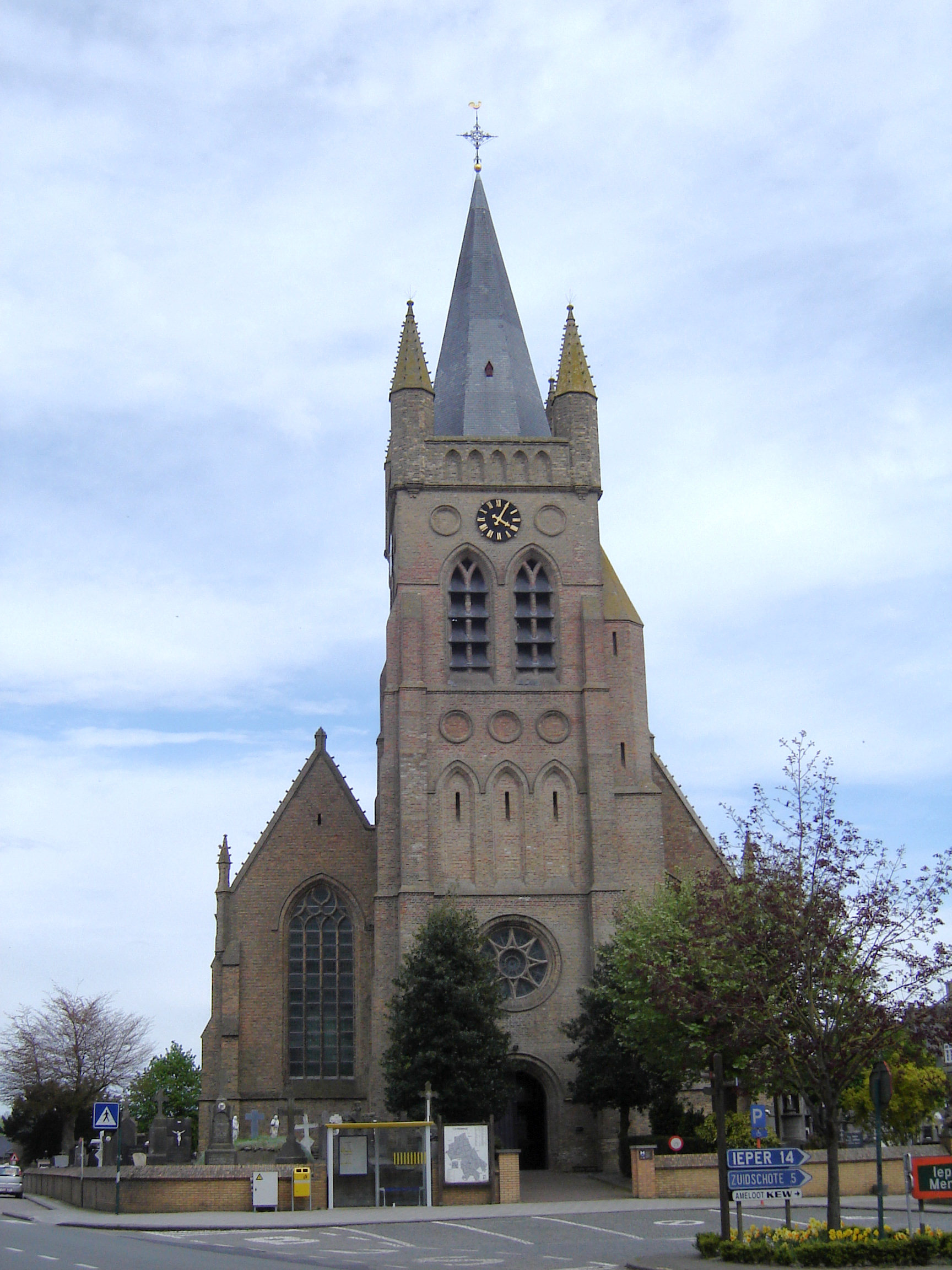
Sint-Rictrudiskerk in Reninge

Reninge is a town in north-west Belgium in the province of West Flanders with approximately 1,000 inhabitants. Since the reforms of 1977, it is located in the municipality of Lo-Reninge and is part of the Arrondissement of Diksmuide. Its postcode is B-8647.

== See also ==
- West Flanders
