= Saint-Hubert Airfield =

- IATA: none; ICAO: EBSH

Summary
- Airport type: Public
- Serves: Saint-Hubert
- Location: Wallonia, Belgium
- Elevation AMSL: 1,847 ft / 563 m
- Coordinates: 50°02′09″N 005°24′15″E

Map
- Location of EBSH

Runways
Direction	Length		Surface
Direction	m	ft	Surface
05L/23R	600	1,969	Grass
05R/23L	600	1,969	Grass
14L/32R	799	2,621	Grass
14R/32L	799	2,621	Grass
- Sources: Belgian AIP

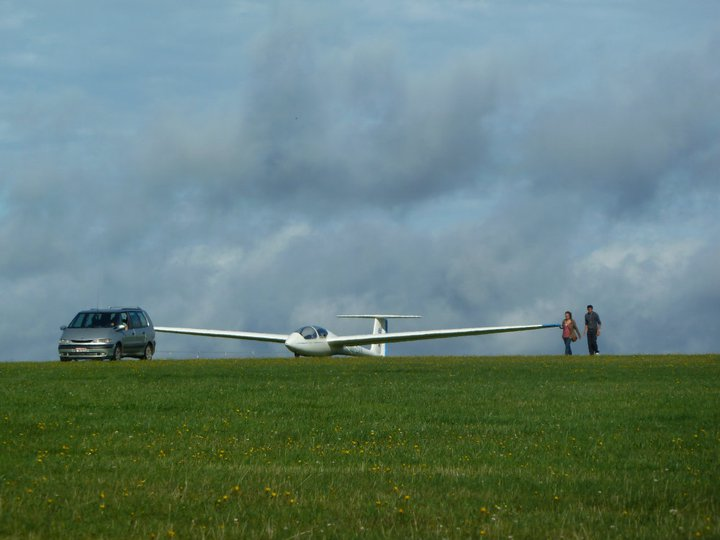
An airplane in the field

Saint-Hubert Airfield (ICAO: EBSH) is a public use airfield located near Saint-Hubert, Belgium, Luxembourg, Wallonia, Belgium.

It is the second highest aerodrome in Belgium at 1,847 ft (563 m) above sea level. It has four grass runways, in two parallel pairs, almost perpendicular; several aircraft hangars are rented on the site. It is located in the heart of the Ardennes, in uncontrolled airspace.

== History ==
Initially created as an aviation school in 1930, the airfield was used as a US Army center in 1945. It was sold to the Belgian state in 1946 and served as a backup airport for the city of Ostend, in case Melsbroek or Brussels Airport were to be unusable. It has a long tradition in glider flying.

== See also ==
- List of airports in Belgium
