= Air Shares Elite =

- Destinations: Point to point
- Headquarters: Waterford, Michigan

Air Shares Elite, offered fractional ownership and rental of private high performance aircraft.

== History ==
Air Shares Elite was formed in 1999 providing shares in aircraft that it owned. In 2014, the service terminated and aircraft were sold.

== Fleet ==
The Air Shares Elite offered a fractional ownership of mainly Cirrus SR22 aircraft, with the intent of offering fractional ownership of the Cirrus Vision SF50 Jet.

== See also ==
- ImagineAir - Airline operating Cirrus aircraft
- NetJets Fractional Jet Ownership
