= Air Taxi Association =

- Type: For profit, one member LLC
- Industry: Aviation transportation
- Founded: June, 2007
- Founder: Joe Leader
- Defunct: December, 2015
- Headquarters: Atlanta, Georgia
- Key people: Bruce Holmes
- Members: 18 companies

The Air Taxi Association, LLC (ATXA) was founded in June 2007 by Joseph Leader as a membership, payment company with the goal of encouraging the adoption of the next-generation air taxi model based on the company's operating interface system booking flights on small jets, commonly referred to as very light jet. Dr. Bruce Holmes was chairman of the advisory board. The following year the company he worked for, Dayjet, went out of business.

American founding members

- BusinessJetSeats
- Earthjet
- ImagineAir
- Jumpjet
- Linear Air
- POGO Jets Inc.
- SATSair
- Virgin Charter

European founding members

- AccelJet
- Air-Cannes
- AirCab
- Blink
- byJets
- ETIRC
- GlobeAir
- Jet Ready
- JetBird
- London Executive Aviation
- NexusJets
- Taxijet
- Wondair
