= SATSair =

American air taxi provider

IATA	ICAO	Call sign
—	SYK	AEROCAB
- Founded: 2004
- Ceased operations: 24 October 2009
- Fleet size: 26 Cirrus SR22
- Headquarters: Greenville, South Carolina, United States
- Website: www.satsair.com

SATSair was an air taxi provider based in Greenville, South Carolina, USA. SATSair was a founding member of the Air Taxi Association (ATXA).

== History ==
The company's first flight was in November 2004. SATSair operated 26 Cirrus SR-22, each equipped with entire-aircraft parachute systems for emergency safety. Unlike traditional charter flights, SATSair offered one-way pricing, so passengers did not directly pay for unused return legs.

Cirrus Design, the company that manufactured the aircraft used by SATSair, was a major shareholder having acquired a 25-percent stake of SATSair in July 2006.

On 24 October 2009 SATSair ceased operations "due to circumstances." The cessation of operations was not unexpected as five of the company's aircraft had been repossessed and were without engines and a further ten company SR22s had been sitting on the ramp without engines for some time.

On 31 December 2009, SATSair filed for Chapter 7 bankruptcy protection.

== See also ==
- Small Aircraft Transportation System
