= LZU =

LZU may refer to:

- Gwinnett County Airport, Atlanta, Georgia, US, IATA airport code LZU
- Lanzhou University, in Gansu, China
