= ImagineAir =

American airline

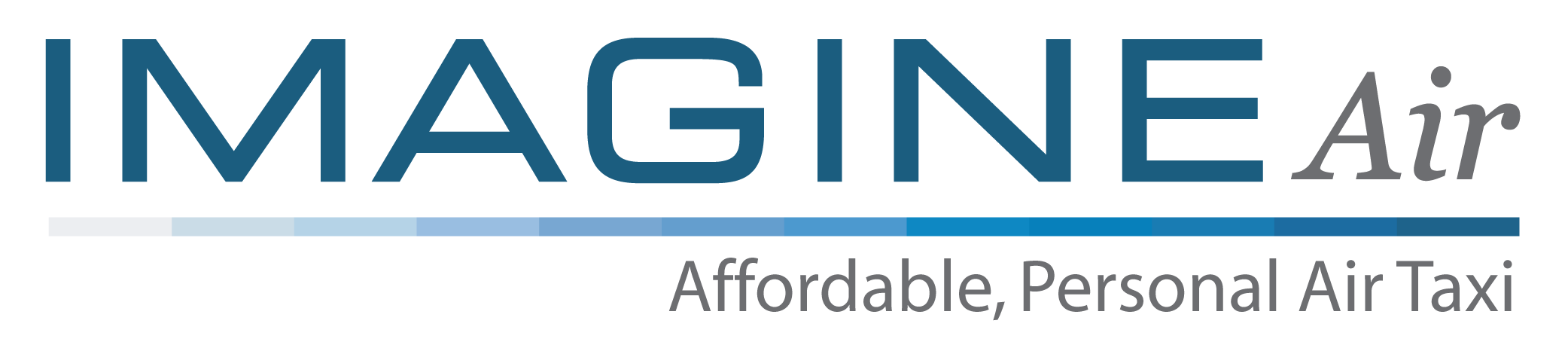
IATA	ICAO	Call sign
-	IMG	IMAGINE
- Founded: 2005; 21 years ago
- Ceased operations: May 2018; 8 years ago
- Secondary hubs: Charleston, South Carolina, Raleigh, North Carolina, Allentown, Pennsylvania
- Frequent-flyer program: Flight Card Program
- Destinations: 900+ in the Southern and Eastern U.S.
- Headquarters: Atlanta, Georgia, United States
- Key people: Benjamin Hamilton, Haroon Qureshi, Ryan Rodd
- Website: www.imagineair.com

ImagineAir was an air taxi service headquartered in metro Atlanta, Georgia. With a service area that covered a majority of the southeastern US, the company operated an average of 5000 flights annually. ImagineAir was often noted for its young management; as founders Aaron Sohacki and Benjamin Hamilton were 19 and 21 respectively when the company was founded, as well as its innovative online aircraft booking system, providing the familiarity of buying an airline seat on a charter.

ImagineAir's business model was based on an industry study of the Small Aircraft Transportation System (SATS), developed by NASA. Implementing a uniform fleet of aircraft and utilizing technology enabled strategies. ImagineAir was a founding member of the Air Taxi Association (ATXA). In 2008, the company reported revenues of US$800,000. In 2015, it had grown to $2.8 million, securing a spot on that year's Inc. 500.

== History ==
ImagineAir was founded in November 2005 as ImagineAir Jet Services LLC by Paul Fischer, Aaron Sohacki and Benjamin Hamilton and headquartered at the Gwinnett County Airport near Atlanta, Georgia. From the beginning it was the intention of the company's founders to fly a network of the Eclipse 500 VLJs; however, delivery delays led ImagineAir to begin operating with Cirrus SR22s. From 2007 through 2012 the company has reported steady quarter over quarter growth, tripling its number of Cirrus aircraft and establishing bases in Charleston, South Carolina, and Raleigh, North Carolina.

In March 2014, ImagineAir announced a merger with the Danbury, Connecticut-based operator Kavoo in an effort to become the first nationwide air taxi carrier. The merger widened ImagineAir's service area to include the entire east coast of the United States and created the largest part 135 air carrier by flight volume.

In May 2018, ImagineAir suspended operations as the company’s leadership and advisors were unable to secure the necessary short-term funding to continue operations, nor the long-term funding to scale the company to profitable scale.

== Fleet ==
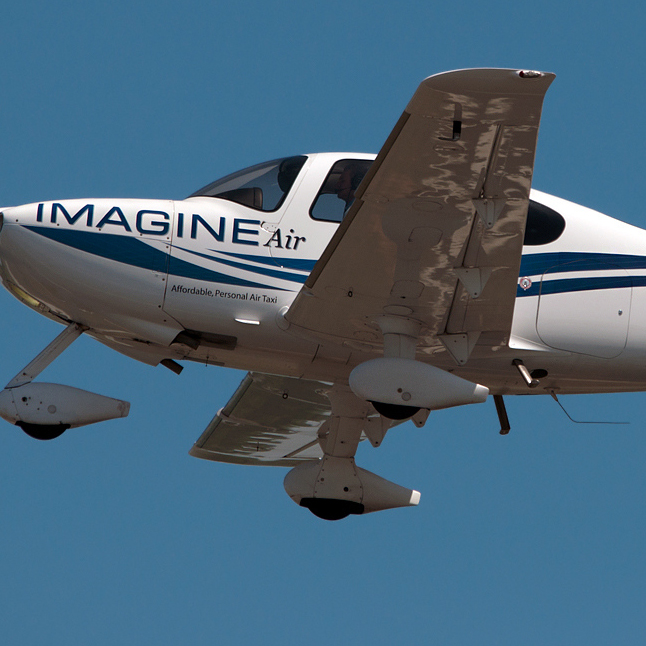
ImagineAir Cirrus SR22

ImagineAir operated a uniform fleet of Cirrus SR22 aircraft. The Cirrus SR22 is a single-engine, originally four and later five-seat, composite aircraft, built by Cirrus Aircraft. The aircraft is perhaps best known for being equipped with the Cirrus Airframe Parachute System (CAPS), an emergency parachute capable of lowering the entire aircraft (and occupants) to the ground in an emergency.
