= B&F Fk14 Polaris =

German ultralight aircraft

Fk14 Polaris
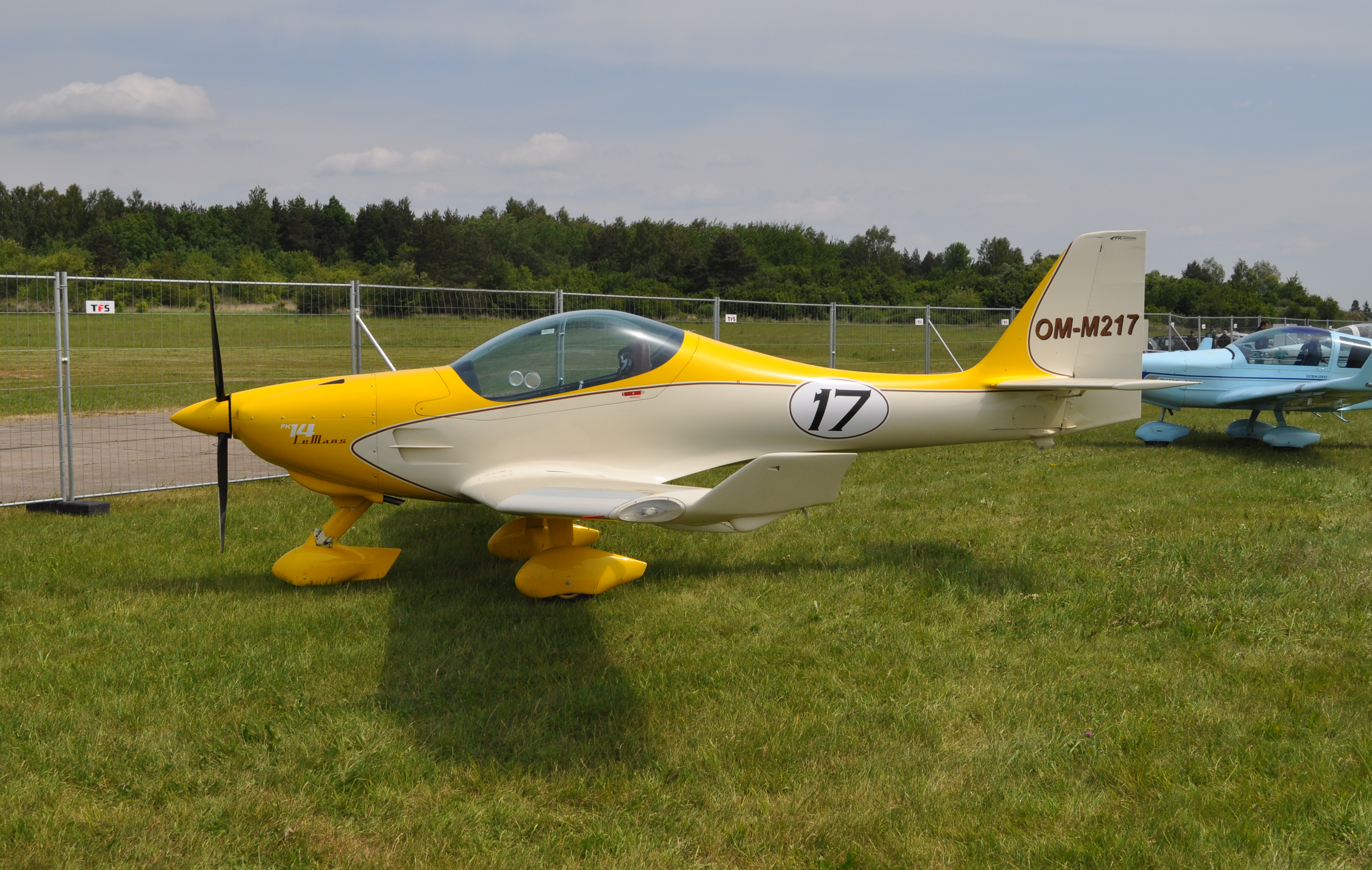

General information
- Type: Two seat sports ultralight
- National origin: Germany
- Manufacturer: B&F Technik, Speyer
- Status: In production
- Number built: 90 by September 2008

History
- First flight: May 1999

The B&F Fk14 Polaris, also called the FK-Lightplanes FK14, is a single-engine, low-wing ultralight aircraft that seats two side by side. Designed in Germany in the late 1990s, it remains in production as of 2024.

The Cirrus SR Sport, simply called the Cirrus SRS, was a version of the B&F Fk14 Polaris that was intended to be marketed as a light-sport aircraft by U.S.-based aircraft manufacturer Cirrus Design (now called Cirrus Aircraft), and was promoted from 2007 until its suspension in 2009 during the economic crisis.

== Design and development ==
Design of the B&F Fk14 Polaris, sometimes known as the Funk Fk 14 Polaris but not by its makers, began in 1998. It first flew in May 1999 and started in production the next year. It is a low-wing, single-engine ultralight, with enclosed accommodation for two seated side by side. Its largely glass fibre (carbon on the Fk14B variant) wing is mostly of parallel chord but toward the tips, where short span aluminium ailerons occupy the trailing edges, the leading edge is swept. Electrically operated Fowler flaps are fitted. Four flap settings are available: +0°, +10°, +20° and +32°. The wingtips incorporate short winglets. The fin and rudder are gently swept; the rudder is deep, reaching the lower fuselage line and moving in a cutout between the elevators. These rear flying surfaces are mass-balanced. The Polaris also has spring-trimmed controls.

Until 2007 B&F offered a choice of steel framed or monocoque fuselage structures, but since then have produced only the latter. The occupants sit side by side under a single piece, forward-hinged canopy. The standard undercarriage is of tricycle configuration, though a conventional undercarriage is an option. The main legs are fuselage mounted spring cantilevers and the nosewheel is steerable. All wheels are spatted. The Polaris may be fitted with a ballistic parachute (BRS 5) as an option.

There is a choice between two of the Rotax 912 series flat four-cylinder engines: either the 60 kW (80 hp) 912 UL or the 74 kW (99 hp) 912 ULS may be fitted. These engines drive three-blade, ground adjustable pitch propellers.

=== Cirrus SRS ===
At EAA AirVenture Oshkosh 2007, the U.S. aircraft manufacturer Cirrus Design announced that they intended to market a version of the Fk14 as the Cirrus SR Sport, also known as the Cirrus SRS. First deliveries were initially planned for mid-2008. In early 2008, the company began taking orders for delivery, with a $5,000 deposit required.

Cirrus Design's then-CEO, Alan Klapmeier, announced in October 2008 that, due to the economic situation and resulting lack of demand for Cirrus aircraft, the company was moving to a three-day work week and that the introduction of the Cirrus SRS had been delayed due to a lack of demand in the light sport aircraft (LSA) market sector. In April 2009, the company announced that it was suspending the project, citing economic conditions and the need to develop the airplane and expand flight-training strategy. They also stated that with time the LSA rules are expected to change and allow Cirrus to build an LSA with a broader mission profile.

As of February 2022, a full-scale mockup of the Cirrus SRS is located at the Duluth Children's Museum in Duluth, Minnesota, donated to the museum by Cirrus for visitors to learn and interact with.

== Operational history ==
The 90th Polaris was completed in September 2008. In mid-2010, the European registers (excluding Russia) listed 72 aircraft.

== Variants ==
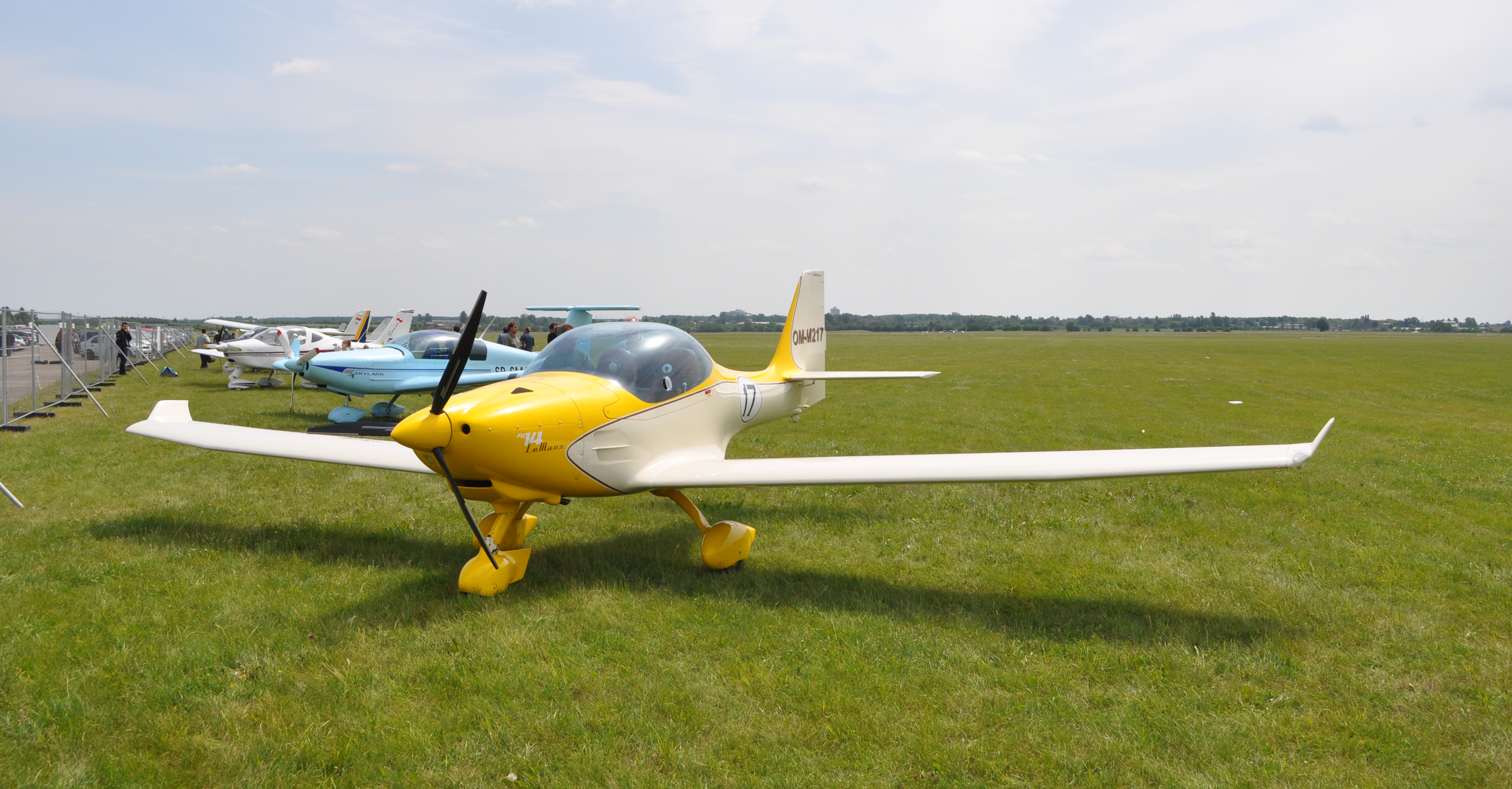
Fk14 Polaris in 2012

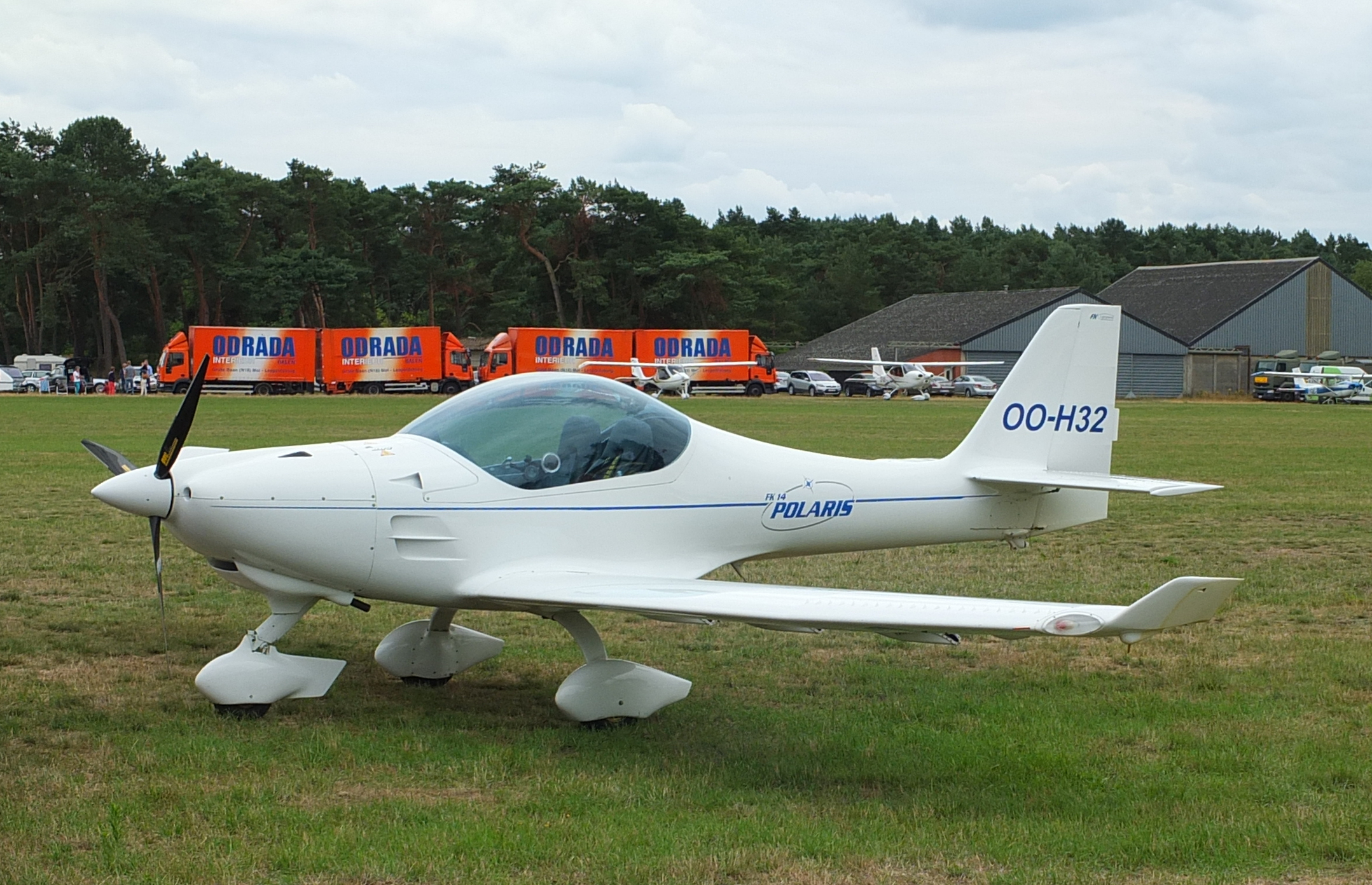
B&F Technik FK-14B at Keiheuvel

Fk14
Standard version.
Fk14B
Introduced circa 2003, with new carbon fibre wing, greater range, improved access with greater canopy opening angle; baggage space behind seats; altered engine cowling.
Fk14B2 Polaris
Model with redesigned wing with slotted flaps to improve short-field performance. Small spoilers are fitted to the ailerons to reduce adverse yaw.
FK14 B2 LeMans
Version with the bubble canopy replaced by two separate "roadster-style" windshields mounted in a single frame.
Cirrus SRS
Currently suspended. First under development by Cirrus Design Co. in the United States from 2007–2009, this met local LSA rules: test bed had flown.

== Specifications (Fk14 Polaris) ==
Data from Jane's All the World's Aircraft 2010/11

General characteristics

- Capacity: two
- Length: 5.69 m (18 ft 8 in)
- Wingspan: 9.04 m (29 ft 8 in)
- Height: 2.00 m (6 ft 7 in)
- Wing area: 9.40 m^{2} (101.2 sq ft)
- Empty weight: 284 kg (626 lb) including parachute
- Max takeoff weight: 472.5 kg (1,042 lb)
- Fuel capacity: 65 L (15.8 imp gal, 19.0 US gal) standard
- Powerplant: 1 × Rotax 912ULS 4- cylinder flat four, air and water cooled, 73.5 kW (98.6 hp)
- Propellers: 3-bladed Junkers or Duc, ground adjustable pitch/

Performance

- Cruise speed: 243 km/h (151 mph, 131 kn) at 75% power
- Stall speed: 64 km/h (40 mph, 35 kn)
- Never exceed speed: 290 km/h (180 mph, 160 kn)
- Range: 648 km (403 mi, 350 nmi)
- g limits: +4/−2
- Rate of climb: 7.5 m/s (1,480 ft/min)
