= Gwinnett County Airport =

Airport in Lawrenceville, Georgia, United States of America

Coordinates: 33°58′41″N 083°57′45″W

Gwinnett County Airport Briscoe Field
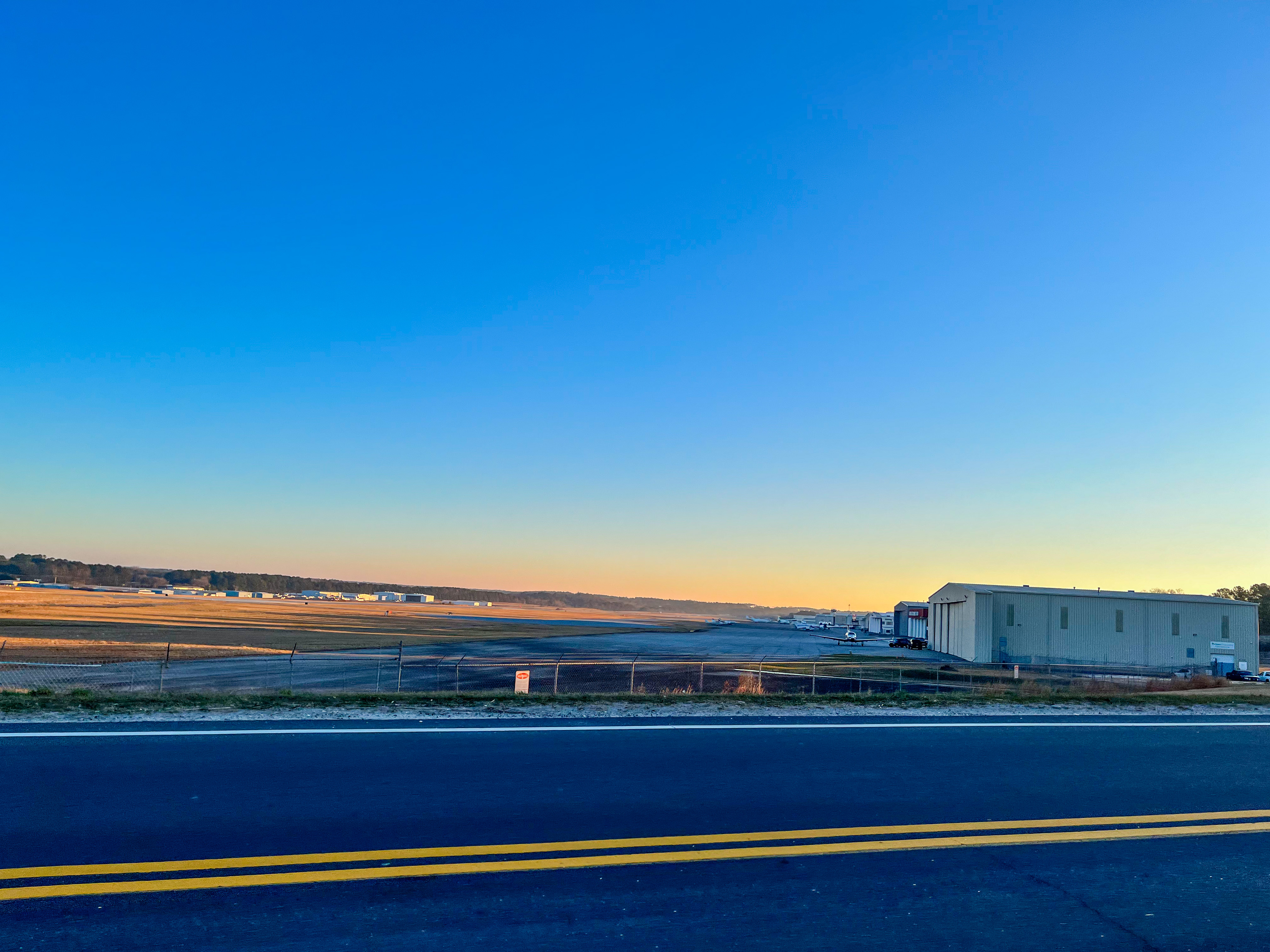
- IATA: LZU; ICAO: KLZU; FAA LID: LZU

Summary
- Airport type: Public
- Owner: Gwinnett County
- Operator: Gwinnett County Department of Transportation
- Serves: Atlanta, Georgia
- Location: Lawrenceville, GA
- Elevation AMSL: 1,060 ft (320 m)
- Website: Official website

Map
- Location of airport in Georgia LZU (the United States)

Runways
| Direction | Length | | Surface |
| Direction | ft | m | Surface |
|---|---|---|---|
| 7/25 | 6,000 | 1,829 | Asphalt |

Statistics (2018)
- Aircraft operations: 82,895
- Based aircraft: 80
- Source: Federal Aviation Administration

Gwinnett County Airport (IATA: LZU, ICAO: KLZU, FAA LID: LZU) at Briscoe Field is a municipal airport in Gwinnett County, Georgia, partially in the Lawrenceville city limits. It is located about 2 miles (3.2 km) northeast of the city center of Lawrenceville and about 30 miles (48 km) northeast of Downtown Atlanta. It is owned and operated by the Gwinnett County government, in northeastern metro Atlanta.

It has a 6,000-foot (1,800 m) runway, and is 1,061 feet (323 m) above mean sea level (AMSL). Student training is conducted at the airport by several different flight schools, including ATP Flight School. Two fixed-base operators (FBOs), Landmark (north ramp) and Aircraft Specialists (south ramp), serve the field with facilities, passenger lounges, and fuel. Georgia Jet operates the largest air charter fleet in the Atlanta area from Briscoe Field, transporting passengers nationally and internationally, more than 10 million passenger miles per year. ImagineAir, an air taxi company, is based at the airport. Medway Air Ambulance and Care Medflight operate medical transport services. Its Airport Minimum Standards for Operation were rewritten in 2006.

== Facilities and aircraft ==
Gwinnett County–Briscoe Field covers an area of 520 acres (210 hectares) which contains one asphalt-paved runway designated 7/25 which measures 6,000 ft × 100 ft (1,829 m × 30 m).

For the 12-month period ending December 31, 2018, the airport had 82,895 aircraft operations, an average of 227 per day: 98% general aviation and 1% military. There were 80 aircraft based at the time at this airport: 58 single-engine, 11 multi-engine, 7 jet and 4 helicopter. There is currently no commercial service out of LZU. The closest airport offering passenger flights would be ATL located 42 miles to the southwest of LZU.

== Privatization ==
In May 2010 the FAA gave preliminary approval to a plan to privatize the airport. This allowed Gwinnett County to further study plans on a possible sale of the airport to private investors. New York-based Propeller Investments offered to buy Briscoe Field and upgrade it with a ten-gate terminal to attract more scheduled airline services and build a runway capable of accommodating planes as large as 737s. Atlanta's dominant airline, Delta, lobbied against the proposal due to its reluctance to split operations between Hartsfield-Jackson International Airport and Briscoe Field, even though two US carriers, Allegiant and Sun Country Airlines, do not yet offer service to Atlanta.

In June 2012, the county's Board of Commissioners canceled the privatization plan, amid local opposition to initiating commercial passenger service from the airport. The Board claims that it would not have been a suitable location for an airport due to the already widespread development around Briscoe, which would also have limited future expansion plans. They also raised the issue of distance, claiming that it was "too far away from metro Atlanta’s main population base", citing industry experts who said "most travelers would continue to utilize Hartsfield-Jackson over Briscoe because it would offer more flights, more destinations, and better ticket pricing". They also characterized Propeller Investments as a startup company without airport operations experience.

== See also ==
- List of airports in Georgia (U.S. state)
