= Cirrus Aircraft =

Aircraft manufacturer located in the United States

Cirrus Design Corporation
- Logo since February 2024
- Trade name: Cirrus Aircraft
- Formerly: Cirrus Design (1984–2009)
- Type: Public
- Traded as: SEHK: 2507
- Industry: Aerospace
- Founded: 1984; 42 years ago in Baraboo, Wisconsin, United States
- Founders: Alan & Dale Klapmeier
- Headquarters: Duluth, Minnesota, United States
- Area served: Worldwide
- Key people: Zean Nielsen (CEO); Patrick Waddick (president, innovation & operations, Duluth division); Todd Simmons (president, customer experience, Knoxville division); George Letten (executive vice president & CFO); Dale Klapmeier (senior advisor)
- Products: Light aircraft
- Revenue: ▲US$1.35 billion (2025)
- Owner: China Aviation Industry General Aircraft (CAIGA)
- Number of employees: 3,190+ (June 2026)
- Parent: Aviation Industry Corporation of China (AVIC)
- Subsidiaries: Flying Colors Aviation
- Website: www.cirrusaircraft.com

The Cirrus Design Corporation, doing business as Cirrus Aircraft (formally Cirrus Design), is an aircraft design, manufacturing, maintenance and management company, as well as a provider of flight training services, that was founded in 1984 by Alan and Dale Klapmeier to produce the VK-30 homebuilt aircraft. The company is headquartered in Duluth, Minnesota, United States, with operational locations in six other states—Arizona, Florida, Michigan, North Dakota, Tennessee (where its customer headquarters are based in Knoxville), and Texas—and sales locations in France and the Netherlands. It is majority-owned by a subsidiary of the Aviation Industry Corporation of China (AVIC).

Cirrus markets several versions of its three certificated single-engine light aircraft models: the SR20 (certified in 1998), SR22 (certified in 2000), and SR22T (certified in 2010). As of July 2024, the company had delivered 10,000 SR-aircraft in 25 years of production, and has been the world's largest producer of piston-powered aircraft since 2013 and general aviation aircraft since 2022. As of 2024, it is the world's third-largest aviation manufacturer by unit-volume.

Sales of the SR-series grew rapidly during the 2000s, until the 2008 financial crisis when they slowed significantly and the company downsized. In the mid-to-late 2010s, Cirrus returned to profitability and funded U.S.-based expansion. In 2016, it certified and began deliveries of the Vision SF50 very light jet, the first civilian single-engine jet to enter the market; the aircraft is often referred to as a "personal jet".

The company produces all of its aircraft with composite materials and is known for pioneering new technologies in the light general aviation aircraft manufacturing industry, including glass cockpits and full-airframe ballistic parachutes.

In 2001, Cirrus sold a majority of the company to Bahrain-based Arcapita. Ten years later, the manufacturer was acquired by China Aviation Industry General Aircraft (CAIGA), a division of the Chinese state-owned AVIC. In 2024, it became a minority publicly-owned company as a component of the Hong Kong Stock Exchange.

== History ==
=== 1980s ===
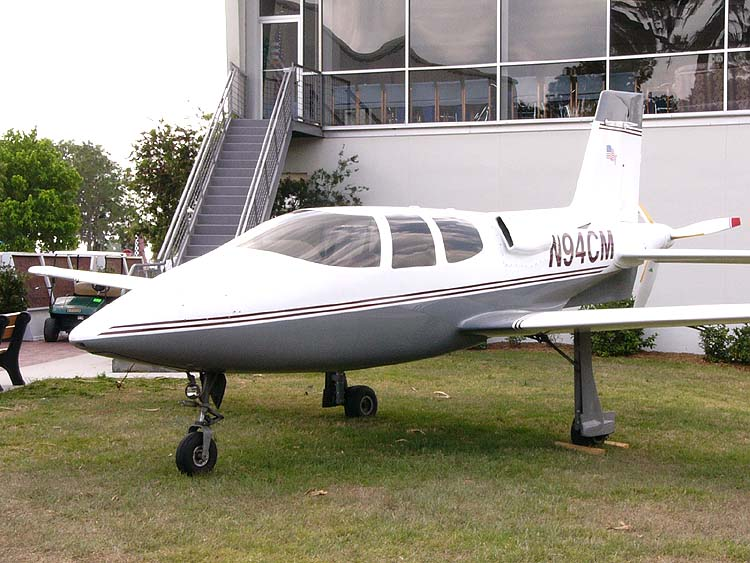
Cirrus VK-30 kit aircraft

In the early 1980s, while still in college, brothers Alan and Dale Klapmeier began making drawings and building foam models of the Cirrus VK-30. By 1984, they founded the Cirrus Design Company and along with spouses Jeff and Sally Viken, started developing the VK-30 as a kit aircraft project in the basement of the Klapmeier family's barn in rural Baraboo, Wisconsin. After a few years in the design phase, the brothers borrowed money to construct their own hangars on the Baraboo–Wisconsin Dells Airport, where they began flight testing. The VK-30 was introduced at the 1987 EAA Oshkosh Convention and first flew on 11 February 1988. Kit deliveries commenced shortly thereafter.

=== 1990s ===
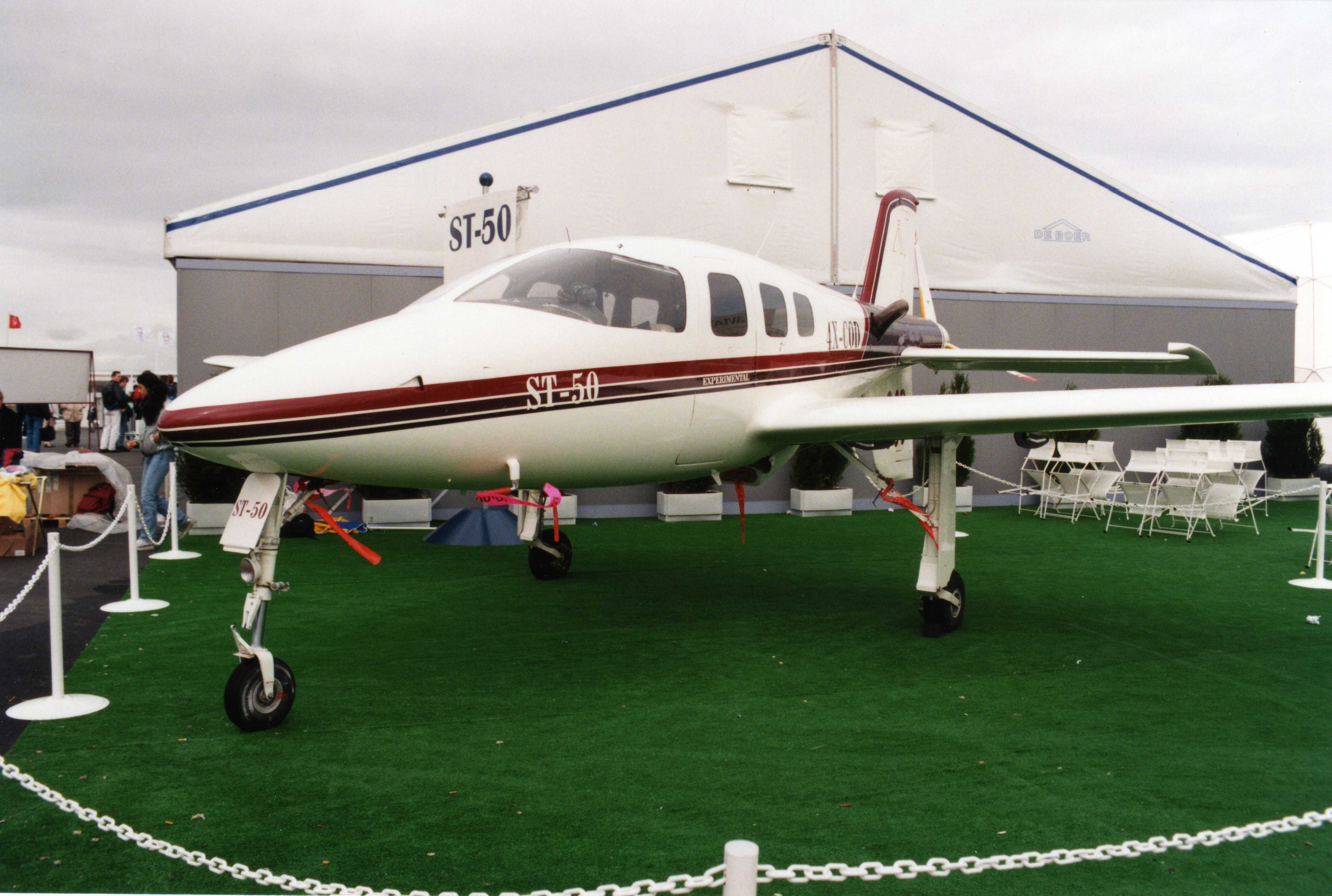
Cirrus-designed Israviation ST50 at the Paris Air Show in 1997

Cirrus began designing the ST-50 under contract to Israeli aircraft manufacturer IsrAviation in the early 1990s. The aircraft was configured like the Cirrus VK-30 but powered by a Pratt & Whitney Canada PT6-135 turboprop engine, in place of the piston engine used in the VK-30. The prototype was first flown on 7 December 1994 by Norman E. Howell. Earlier that year, the Klapmeier brothers moved company headquarters from southern Wisconsin to a much larger facility at the Duluth International Airport in Duluth, Minnesota, bringing 35 employees with them and hiring another 15 at once.

In August 1996, Cirrus announced plans to build a plant at the Grand Forks International Airport in Grand Forks, North Dakota.

By the middle of the decade the company had discontinued the VK-30 and began development of the Cirrus SR20, which was first flown on 21 March 1995 and type certified on 23 October 1998. This was followed by customer deliveries of the SR20 beginning in July 1999.

=== 2000s ===
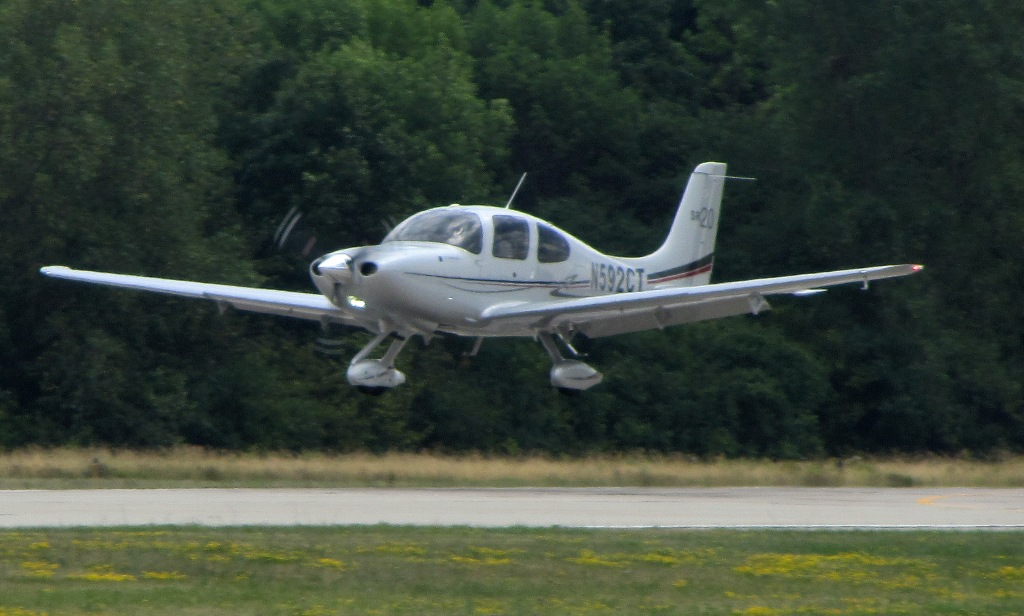
Cirrus SR20 landing

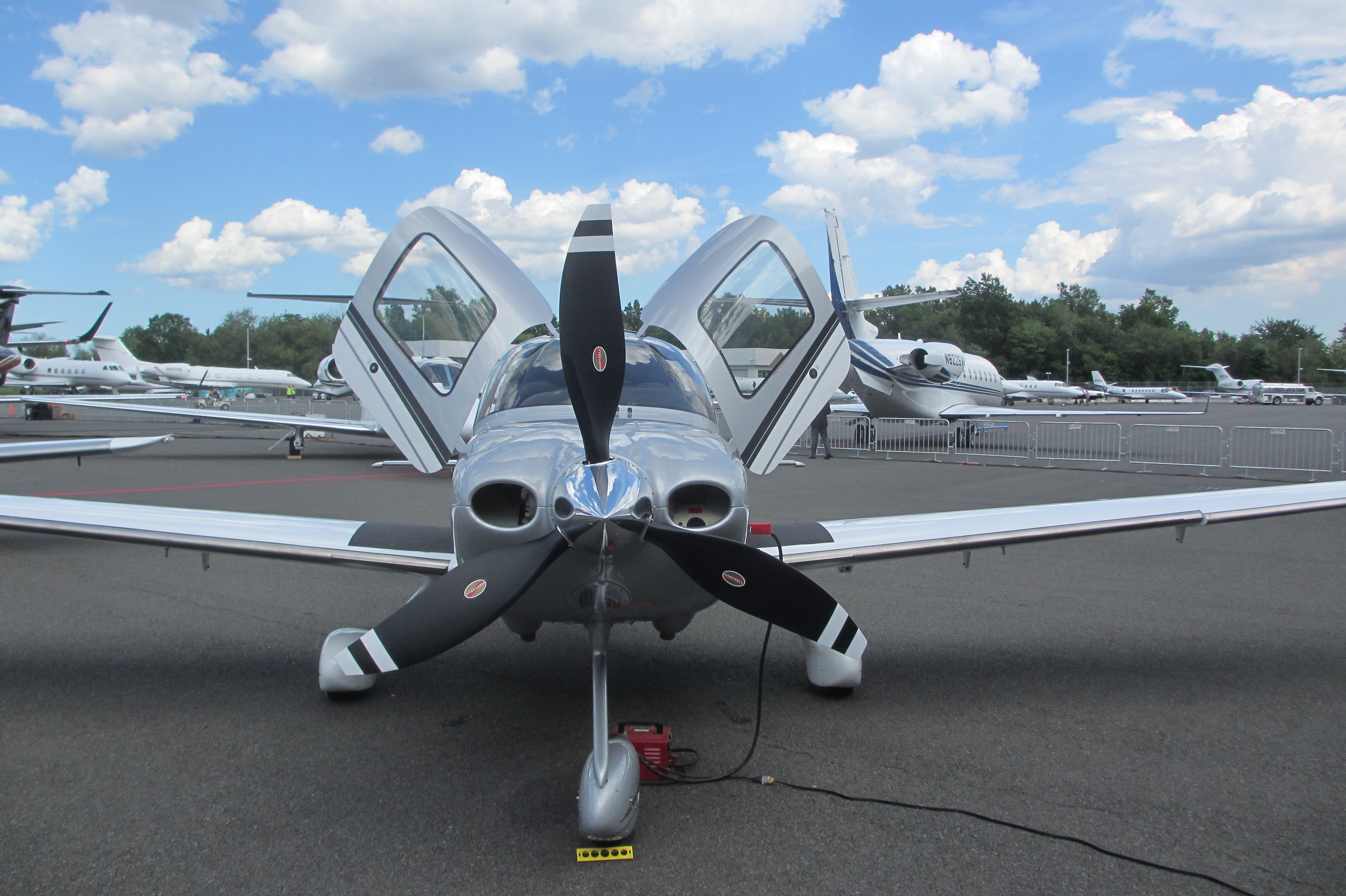
Cirrus SR22 front view

In June 2000, the company received an FAA Production Certificate for its SR20 aircraft. On 30 November of that year, Cirrus received a type certificate for its next model, the Cirrus SR22, which began deliveries in 2001.

In August 2001, Cirrus sold 58% of the company for $100 million to Crescent Capital, the U.S. arm of the First Islamic Investment Bank of Bahrain (now called Arcapita).

In July 2002, the company announced that it would collaborate with the University of North Dakota Aerospace Foundation to provide a new Cirrus Customer Training program. In February the following year, Cirrus delivered the industry's first-ever all glass cockpit light aircraft, sparking a major transition in general aviation, whereby over 90% of all new light aircraft by the year 2006 were equipped with glass cockpits.

In June 2004, Cirrus received type certification for the SR20 from the European Aviation Safety Agency (EASA). That same year, Cirrus accomplished record-breaking sales, up 69% over the previous year. The SR22 became the world's best-selling general aviation aircraft.

Cirrus entered the civilian flight-training fleet market with SR20 deliveries to Sweden's Lund University in January 2005, followed by Western Michigan University in September of that year.

In 2006, the company delivered 721 aircraft (at the time its most in a single year), celebrating the 3,000th SR-series airplane off the production line only seven years after deliveries commenced, something that no other aviation company had accomplished in the last half-century. That summer, Cirrus acquired a 25-percent stake in SATSair, a 2004 start-up air taxi operator that flew 26 SR22s. SATSair ceased operations on 24 October 2009.

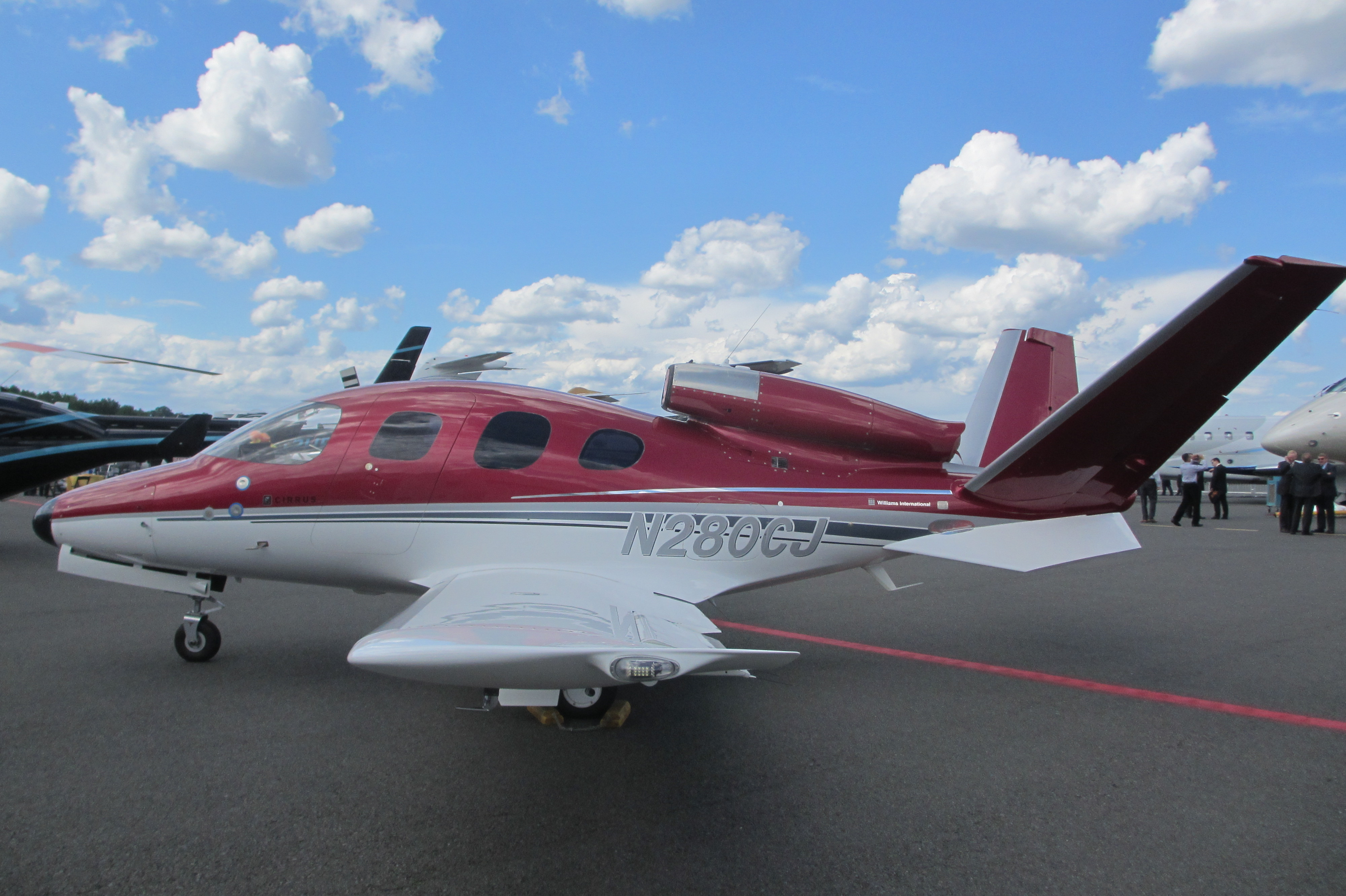
Cirrus Vision SF50 single-engine very light jet

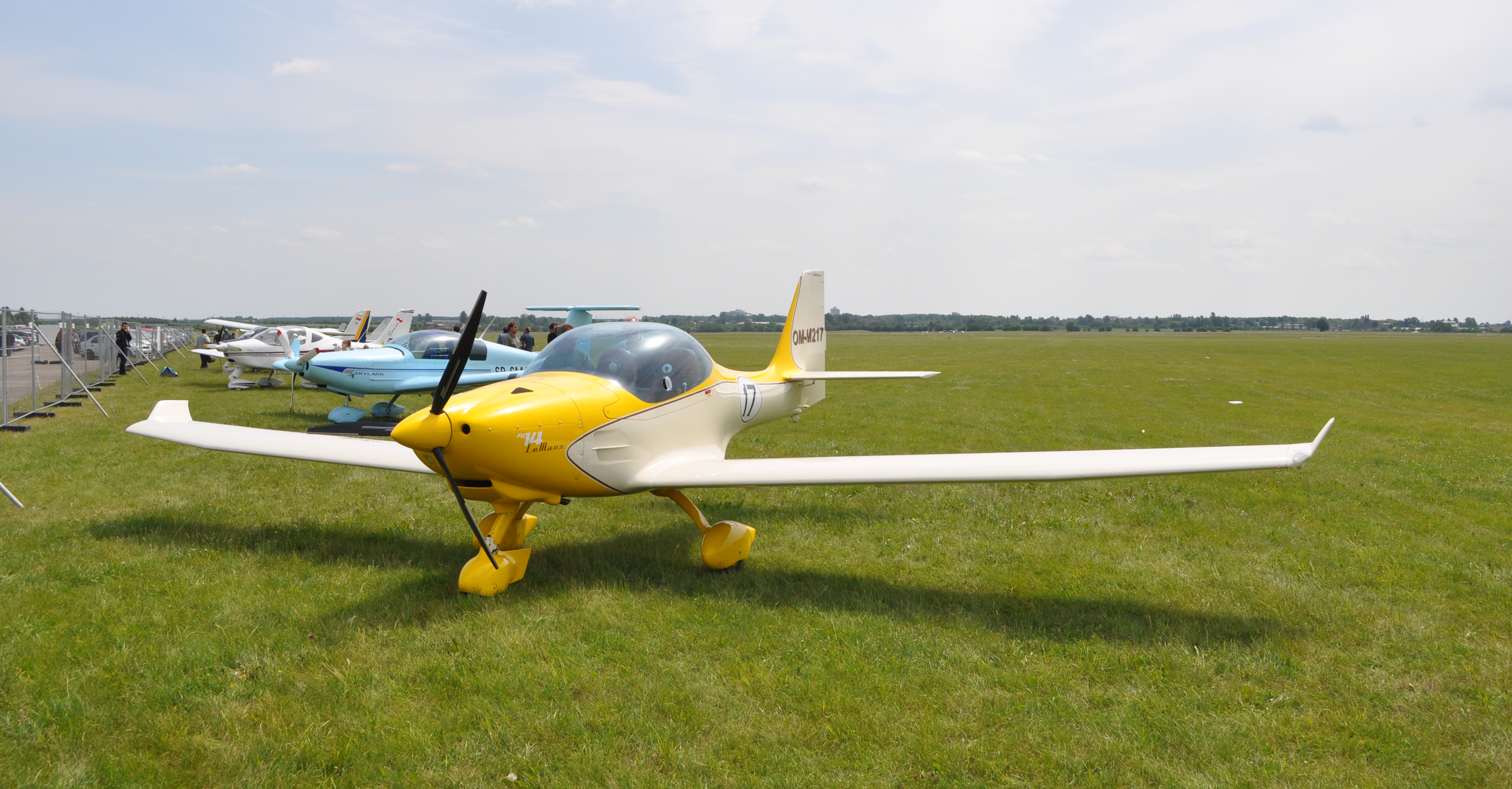
Cirrus SRS light-sport aircraft (Fk14 Polaris)

On 28 June 2007 the Cirrus Vision SF50 single-engine light jet was unveiled (then known simply as "The-Jet"). At the 2007 EAA AirVenture Oshkosh airshow, the company unveiled the Cirrus SR Sport (also called the SRS) light-sport aircraft. A version of the B&F Fk14 Polaris, the type never entered production for Cirrus. In December 2007 Arcapita stated that it was looking to sell its share of the company. Cirrus indicated at the time of the announcement that this was expected as Arcapita was considered a medium-term investor.

The Jet took its first flight on 3 July 2008. In September 2008, the global sale slump in piston-engined aircraft led the company to lay off 100 workers, or 8% of its workforce. This included 79 people at the main plant in Duluth, Minnesota, and 29 employees at the composite construction plant in Grand Forks, North Dakota. After this round of lay-offs Cirrus had 1,230 employees remaining. Company COO Brent Wouters stated that the lay-offs were due to "not selling as many airplanes as we'd hoped to this year."

Company CEO Alan Klapmeier announced in October 2008 that due to the economic situation and resulting lack of demand for Cirrus aircraft, the company was moving to a three-day work week. He reported that sales were down 10% over the same period in the previous year. Compared to the industry average in that same period sales were down 16%. Klapmeier also indicated that introduction of the SRS would be delayed until 2009, due to lack of demand in the light-sport aircraft market sector, but that the Cirrus Vision SF50 jet would not be delayed.

Cirrus eliminated 208 employee positions in the fall of 2008 and cut aircraft production from 14 to 12 aircraft per week in response to the economic situation. In November 2008, the company announced that it would lay-off about 500 production employees for one month to allow for reductions in excess stock of aircraft produced. Between December 2008 and January 2009, the company began the process of changing its name from Cirrus Design to Cirrus Aircraft.

Cirrus started recalling its workers on 5 January 2009 after the month-long shutdown. The furloughed workers were called back slowly over the month, to ramp up production to eight aircraft per week, compared to a company capacity of 16 aircraft per week. The company indicated at that time that it would retain the ability to reduce its workforce quickly as the economic situation and sales numbers dictate.

On 9 January 2009, Cirrus announced that it would lay off 50 administrative employees and extend the layoff period for 100 of the 500 employees laid off over Christmas 2008. Company spokesman Bill King stated that the cuts were necessary or else the company would not survive the 2008 financial crisis.

In early February 2009, the company's new CEO, Brent Wouters, indicated that the future of the company would likely hinge on the Vision SF50 jet design as production of the piston single-engine SR-series had fallen to 20% of its 2008 rate of 16 aircraft per week. Wouters characterized demand for new aircraft as "awful" and added, "We are increasing our focus on the jet, because that is going to be our future engine for growth in my estimation."

In April 2009, the company announced that it was suspending the light-sport SRS aircraft project. It cited economic conditions, that the aircraft required development, an expanded flight-training strategy and that the LSA rules were expected to change over time to allow LSAs with a broader mission profile.

On 29 April 2009, the company announced that it was increasing production from the previous 3-4 aircraft per week back to 6 aircraft per week. The change was accomplished without recalling any laid-off workers. The company stated: "We continue to see very encouraging trends in sales activities and interest from sales prospects domestically and around the world. Clearly, this is an upward move and is indicative of a stronger bias toward growth in aircraft orders. Though we remain in a very challenging environment, our hope is that this new rate is the first step and initial indicator of what will become a more substantial trend into the second half of the year and beyond."

On 1 June 2009, the company announced it was recalling 50 workers and boosting production to 8 aircraft per week.

The company stated:

In contrast to other reported general aviation industry trends, Cirrus Aircraft has seen consistent growth in new aircraft orders over the past 120 days, with stronger order rates consistently outpacing production output over that timeframe. Equally notable are the sources of the new orders. Domestic and international retail demand, as well as both U.S. and global institutional demand, are each playing a contributory role. Cirrus Certified, its pre-owned aircraft sales division, is seeing similar increased sales activity with used aircraft inventory levels showing increasing signs of stabilization.

On 26 June 2009, it was reported by AvWeb that Cirrus co-founder and former CEO Alan Klapmeier intended to buy the Vision SF50 project from Cirrus and its major shareholder Arcapita and produce the aircraft under a new company. The new venture had been receiving financial advice from Merrill Lynch. Klapmeier indicated that his reason for wanting to take over the project was to speed up development and get the aircraft on the market sooner. Cirrus CEO Brent Wouters indicated that while the company intended to proceed with the SF50 program itself, he would listen to Klapmeier's proposal. On Monday 27 July 2009 Wouters and Cirrus co-founder Dale Klapmeier stated at a press conference that they would find a way to produce the SF50, either at Cirrus or through selling it to Alan Klapmeier. They both said that the key factor was raising enough capital to proceed with the project, complete certification and commence production. On Friday 31 July 2009 Alan Klapmeier announced that his offer to buy the SF50 program had not succeeded, with the key issue having been the program selling price, as well as other points and that the negotiations were at an end. Wouters responded saying further talks were possible, but that Cirrus would continue to develop the SF50 in house.

In late August 2009, Cirrus announced that it was laying off 85 employees, mostly office workers. Todd Simmons, vice president of marketing, stated: "These are challenging days for Cirrus, but the decision made is in the best interest in the entire company. Our outlook is still positive. We are making forward progress within the industry."

In November 2009, the company laid off an additional 58 workers, or 10% of the remaining payroll. The company indicated that it had failed to achieve some "institutional sales of aircraft" and that meant the lay-offs were expected, emphasizing that it does not indicate deeper problems with the company. As of 11 November 2009, the company had about 550 production workers employed.

=== 2010s ===
In March 2010, Cirrus went to court in an attempt to get an order to prevent former supplier L-3 Communications from telling other Cirrus suppliers that Cirrus was heading into bankruptcy and from discouraging companies from doing business with Cirrus. On 1 April 2010, Cirrus applied for a "voluntary dismissal" of the case against L3, before L3 had filed a response. L3 had been engaged in a lawsuit against Cirrus for non-payment of US$18.7M in development costs for flat panel electronics, with Cirrus countering that L3 did not abide by the contract terms.

In June 2010, the company began paying back-rent owed to the city of Grand Forks. Cirrus had stopped paying its rent 16 months earlier. It also owed the city of Duluth back rent, which the city has indicated would be forgiven in exchange for job creation.

In February 2011, Cirrus was sold for US$210M to China Aviation Industry General Aircraft (CAIGA), a subsidiary of Aviation Industry Corporation, which is wholly owned by the Government of the People's Republic of China. The announcement of the sale was met with mixed responses. The Duluth News-Tribune labelled it "a sinking feeling of impending loss", while Russ Niles of AvWeb said "Chinese participation in the aviation industry isn't necessarily a bad thing and the folks in Duluth and Grand Forks could have suffered a worse fate. In the absence of a sale, bankruptcy was a real possibility for Cirrus and it might have been hard for a trustee to justify operating the business with the numbers it was showing. As for where it leaves current Cirrus owners and those thinking of buying one, the sale is probably a positive thing."

In mid-March 2011, aviation industry analyst Brian Foley indicated that he was trying to organize a group of US investors to make a counter-offer to the Chinese buy-out to keep Cirrus as a US-owned company. Foley stated that he had seen an "overwhelming response" from the U.S. aviation community, indicating that Americans want Cirrus "to be owned and operated on American soil, period." Foley's counter-offer did not materialize.

In late March 2011, freshman Minnesota congressman Chip Cravaack urged the Committee on Foreign Investment in the United States to exercise "extreme caution" over allowing the sale of Cirrus to the Chinese government, indicating that he was concerned that company technology would be used for Chinese military programs. Cirrus spokesman Todd Simmons responded to the congressman's remarks with surprise, responding that, "the CAIGA transaction is an investment in Duluth and our local communities." On 30 March 2011, at the Sun 'n Fun airshow, company co-founder Dale Klapmeier provided reassurances that Chinese ownership would not result in production being moved out of the US. Klapmeier also expressed disappointment in the political issues raised, particularly by Cravaack. Klapmeier explained, "His concerns are unfounded," detailing that Cirrus did not have any unique technology that could be employed in military applications. Former 18-term Minnesota Congressman Jim Oberstar also came out in support of Cirrus and the acquisition, saying Cravaack was "undermining" the situation, and that "we have nothing to fear from an investment such as this by the Chinese."

The sale was reviewed by the Committee on Foreign Investment in the United States and was approved, as Cirrus has no national security-sensitive trade secrets. The sale to CAIGA was completed as a merger of the two companies on 28 June 2011.

In July 2011, CAIGA president Xiangkai Meng and Duluth Mayor Don Ness signed a non-binding Memorandum of Understanding that the jobs at Cirrus would remain in Duluth and not be moved to China. Ness said "Verbal assurances are wonderful, but a written assurance, signed by the president of CAIGA, certainly carries much more weight."

Following the company's merger with CAIGA in July 2011, company CEO Brent Wouters indicated that Cirrus would move quickly to expand its line of aircraft, including bringing the Vision SF50 jet to market. Wouters said "We need to expand our product line -- bigger, smaller, faster airplanes, a much broader range, and very quickly. And we need more penetration in the top 10 foreign markets. And we must go forward quickly on both avenues."

On the first anniversary of Chinese government ownership in 2012, company CEO Dale Klapmeier indicated that Cirrus was financially in a much better position and progress was being made with certifying the Vision SF-50 jet.

In March 2013, the company was granted a loan for US$950,000 from the city of Grand Forks, North Dakota to purchase an autoclave for composite production at the company's Grand Forks facility. The loan was originally turned down by the city, questioning whether the company would ever repay it. The loan was later allowed and an apology issued.

In July 2013, Cirrus president and COO Pat Waddick indicated that the ongoing Chinese government investment would allow it to continue to develop new models of aircraft with innovative powerplants. CEO Dale Klapmeier stated that the company hopes to eventually establish additional aircraft manufacturing facilities in China.

In 2013 the company delivered 276 new aircraft. This was a 10 percent increase in the number of deliveries over 2012 and the company's best year since before the 2008 recession. In 2013 the SR22 and SR22T were the highest-selling general aviation fixed-wing aircraft in the world and had been for eleven years in a row. Cirrus passed Textron Aviation as the largest producer of piston aircraft by unit-volume in 2013, and has remained the largest ever since.

On 25 March 2014 the company's first conforming Vision SF50 jet flew. Cirrus also indicated that it was continuing to hire engineers, technicians and designers for the jet program. From 2011 to 2014 Cirrus hired more than 300 new workers, bringing the total number of employees to over 800.

In May 2015, Dale Klapmeier announced plans for the company to expand to the McGhee Tyson Airport in Knoxville, Tennessee and establish a customer delivery center there, which officially opened on 12 January 2017 with a focus on aircraft maintenance and support, design personalization, fixed base operations (FBO), flight training and more.

On 28 October 2016, Cirrus received FAA type certification for the Vision SF50 very light jet, with deliveries beginning in December of that year in the company's new Duluth aircraft finishing facility.

In April 2018, the company was named the 2017 winner of the Collier Trophy for the "greatest achievement in aeronautics or astronautics in America" in the past year. The trophy was awarded for "designing, certifying, and entering-into-service the Vision Jet — the world's first single-engine general aviation personal jet aircraft with a whole airframe parachute system".

By the end of 2019, Cirrus employed 1,600 people and produced 81 Vision Jets and 384 SR-series aircraft that year, 465 shipments total, resulting in the company's fifth year of growth and its best year in sales. The Vision SF50 became the world's best-selling general aviation jet.

=== 2020s ===
The company has continued to rapidly grow and expand into the 2020s, adding a thousand jobs from 2021 to 2023, growing its operational footprint with several new facilities in U.S. states such as Texas, Arizona, Florida and Michigan, as well as European countries like France and the Netherlands, and seeing an increase in demand since the start of the COVID-19 pandemic.

In 2022, Cirrus sold 539 SR-aircraft (almost 40% of the entire piston market) and 90 Vision Jets, totaling 629 deliveries, the most since 2007 and nearly $1 billion in total revenue. It also became the largest single producer of general aviation aircraft in 2022 for the first time in the manufacturer's history. It continued this trend in 2023, with SR shipments accounting for over 50 percent of the worldwide piston market, more than twice the output of any competitor.

Since the start of the pandemic, the company has experienced supply chain problems resulting in a backlog of almost 700 SR aircraft (as of March 2022) or nearly two years (as of January 2023). It has also faced challenges from the FAA with two separate airworthiness directives dealing with its Continental piston engines and SR power levers, as well as a company service bulletin dealing with its firing mechanisms for the primer material that ignites the parachute rocket on some SR and Vision Jet aircraft.

Cirrus has helped lead sustainable efforts in the general aviation industry, becoming one of the first OEMs to conduct tests of unleaded fuel in SR22/22Ts and continuing tests of G100UL as part of a program to move towards full unleaded fuels, along with being an early adopter of sustainable aviation fuel (SAF) in the Vision Jet's Williams FJ33 engine.

In June 2023, Cirrus filed an application for an initial public offering (IPO) on the Hong Kong Stock Exchange with the aim of raising around US$300 million for expansion and selling up to 20% of the company. The Chinese government-owned manufacturer does not plan to register with the U.S. Securities and Exchange Commission and thus will not be offering shares to Americans during the IPO, although U.S. investors may be able to buy stock in Cirrus following the IPO. The company ultimately raised HK$1.4 billion in net proceeds, or about US$180 million, and began trading in Hong Kong on Friday, July 12, 2024. In February of that year, the company rebranded to highlight its broadened focus from manufacturing to "flight training, product services and support, aircraft management, upgrades and accessories, sales, finance, insurance, and more”, with CEO Zean Nielsen saying, "Cirrus continues its legacy of delivering innovative products and services that make aircraft ownership easy and synonymous with premium car ownership... The new brand identity honors Cirrus’ history while positioning itself for the future where the company will leverage its intelligent aircraft and connected digital ecosystem.”

In 2024, Cirrus delivered 731 aircraft, its most in a single year to date (topping its 2006 record of 721) and totaling over $1 billion in revenue. In 2025, it shipped 797 aircraft, more than any other aviation company in the world. (Note: The world's second-highest aircraft producer by unit-volume, Airbus, delivered 793 airframes, only four less than Cirrus.)

In July 2026, the company introduced the Cirrus TRAC10 (also known as the SR10). A three-seat trainer aircraft, it will be equipped with the company's signature ballistic parachute, a turbocharged four-piston Rotax 916 iSC engine and a FADEC control system, as well as other flight training accommodations. First deliveries are expected in 2027.

== Facilities ==
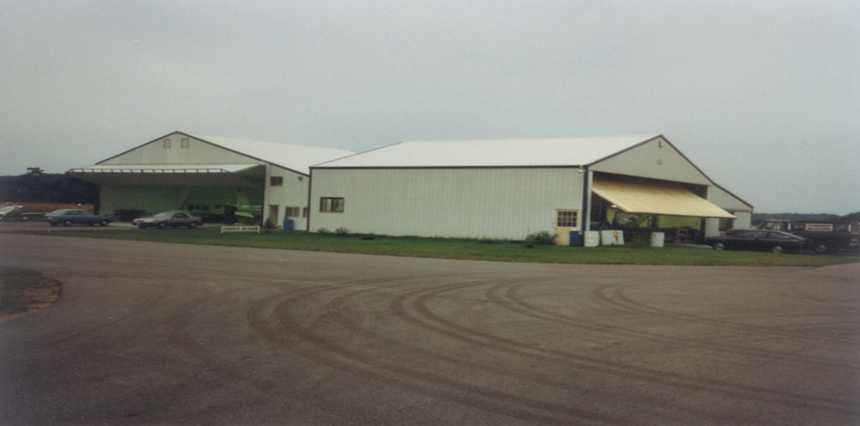
Original Cirrus headquarters on the Baraboo–Dells Airport, c. late 1980s

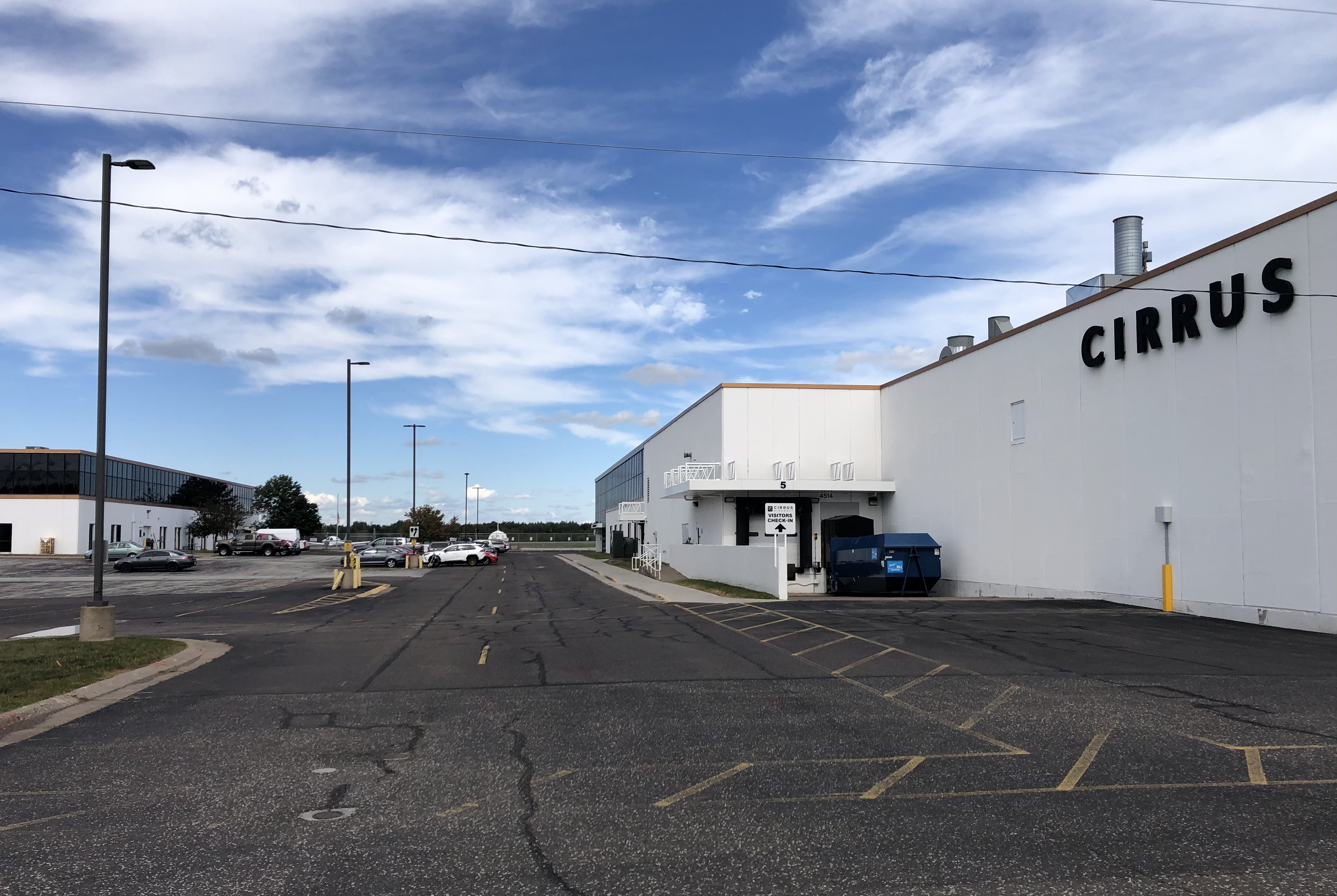
Current headquarters and main manufacturing facilities in Duluth, Minnesota on the Duluth International Airport since 1994. The company now has several facilities in six other states across the US, including its main customer center in Knoxville, Tennessee since 2017.

Cirrus Aircraft has several operational facilities throughout the United States and Europe.

The company's first headquarters was located in Baraboo, Wisconsin. Since 1994, its headquarters and main manufacturing facilities have been in Duluth, Minnesota. In the fall of 2002, Cirrus opened an "aviation incubator" building adjacent to its Duluth headquarters, which it was preparing to buy from the city for US$3.45M in April 2023.

An additional manufacturing facility, which opened in 1997 and produces the composite components for the planes, is located in Grand Forks, North Dakota. The Grand Forks facility was owned by the city of Grand Forks and leased to the company for many years until November 2020, when Cirrus purchased it for US$1.9M, and in June 2025, invested US$13M into it with plans to add another 30,000-square-foot (2,800 m^{2}) onto the 170,000-square-foot (16,000 m^{2}) facility, which was completed in August 2026.

On 27 December 2007, the company secured a lease for a hangar formerly owned by Northwest Airlines (who opened the facility in 1996 and closed it in 2005) at Duluth International Airport. The 189,000-square-foot (17,600 m^{2}) building was to be used for construction of its new Cirrus Jet. Cirrus canceled the lease in 2009 during the height of the Great Recession. In February 2022, Minnesota's St. Louis County approved plans for the company to expand back into the building (formerly used by AAR Corp. from 2012 to 2020) as it ramps up production, with the city of Duluth selling it to Cirrus in September of that year for just $1 in exchange for 80 additional jobs at an hourly rate of at least $36.05. Cirrus invested US$20M into the facility as its flagship "Innovation Center" to support engineering, design, testing, product development and other technical operations by the company. It opened on 26 September 2023.

In February 2015, Duluth agreed to put up US$6M and asked the state contribute the remaining US$4M to build a US$10M "Paint and Finish Facility" on the Duluth Airport dedicated to the production of SF50s. The city would then try to recoup its costs for the facility from lease payments by Cirrus over time. The factory opened on 19 December 2016, and was expanded on 15 July 2022.

On 6 May 2015, Cirrus announced that it will establish a new facility campus called the "Vision Center" in Knoxville, Tennessee on the city's McGhee Tyson Airport. The facility will focus on all customer interactions and aircraft service including training (with a full level-D flight simulator), maintenance & repair, personalization, and deliveries for both the Vision Jet and SR-series. The center opened on 12 January 2017. All manufacturing operations were said to remain in Duluth and Grand Forks.

In May 2019, the company announced that it will open its first factory-direct satellite service facility outside of Knoxville, at McKinney National Airport near Dallas, Texas, where it will expand its flight training, maintenance, and aircraft management operations. In May 2023, the company started construction of a 45,000 sq ft (4,200 m^{2}) addition to its McKinney Airport facility at a cost of US$13 million, with the airport, city of McKinney and McKinney Economic Development Corporation contributing funds. The new construction will provide space for aircraft sales, flight training, factory service and aircraft management. It will also include a 15,000 sq ft (1,400 m^{2}) maintenance hangar, 15,000 sq ft (1,400 m^{2}) storage hangar, eight shade hangars, a flight simulator room, retail store and customer lounge area.

In February 2020, Cirrus announced plans to establish a new engineering and design center in the Phoenix, Arizona metropolitan area, unveiled in September 2021 to be an Innovation Center located in the city of Chandler. Also in September, the company announced plans to open another Cirrus Innovation Center in McKinney, Texas, and expand its flight training services to a facility on the Scottsdale Airport in Scottsdale, Arizona. Later that same month, Cirrus Orlando was introduced, with two new training and service locations in Central Florida at the Kissimmee Gateway Airport in Kissimmee, Florida and Orlando Executive Airport in Orlando, Florida.

In February 2022, Cirrus announced that it had acquired the assets of Benton Harbor, Michigan–based Flying Colors Aviation, Inc., to expand the current facility there and increase its paint production capabilities, and in April announced the opening of both Cirrus France and Cirrus Rotterdam, two regional sales offices located in Valenciennes, France and Rotterdam, Netherlands, that will also support existing Cirrus training and service centers across Europe.

In June 2026, the company unveiled a new "Talent Center" in Hermantown, Minnesota, seeking to add 240 additional jobs in the town, which neighbors Duluth. It will act as a centralized hub for workforce development, technical training and recruitment, housed in a former Harley-Davidson facility.

== Management ==
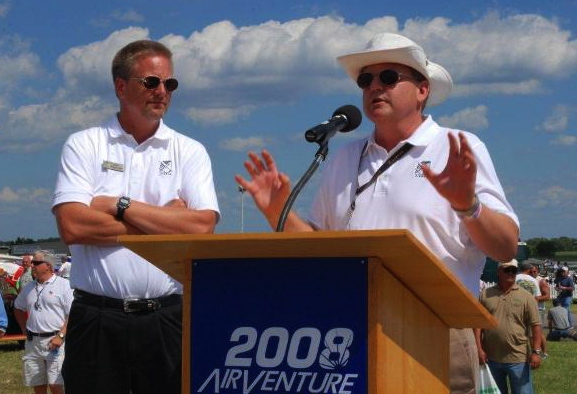
Cirrus founders the Klapmeier brothers (Dale pictured left, Alan right) both led the company from its 1984 inception until 2009; Dale then led it for the following decade while Alan pursued other ventures. Together they were inducted into the National Aviation Hall of Fame in 2014.

From 1984, co-founder Alan Klapmeier served as president until January 2006 and chief executive officer (CEO) until February 2009, while co-founder Dale Klapmeier led the company's design, testing and production and served as executive vice president until January 2006.

On 19 January 2006, Cirrus and the Klapmeier brothers announced that chief operating officer (COO) David Coleal had been named president.

On 18 December 2008, the company made public that COO Brent Wouters would be appointed president and CEO effective 1 February 2009. David Coleal was no longer with the company and Alan Klapmeier continued as chairman of the board, with Dale Klapmeier as vice-chairman.

On 1 August 2009, Cirrus Aircraft CEO Brent Wouters announced that Alan Klapmeier's contract as chairman would not be renewed when it expired at the end of that month. Alan left Cirrus on 21 August 2009 and Dale became interim chairman the following month.

On 19 September 2011, the company announced that Dale Klapmeier has been named CEO and that Brent Wouters, previously president and CEO, is no longer with the company.

On 12 March 2013, early Cirrus employee Patrick Waddick, who originally became hired as an intern by the Klapmeier brothers in 1988 to sweep floors for the company, was named president, adding this to his COO position.

On 6 May 2015, Cirrus reported that chief customer officer (CCO) Todd Simmons will lead the new Vision Center in Knoxville, Tennessee, where all customer activities and operations for the company will take place.

On 19 December 2018, it was announced that Dale Klapmeier will step down as CEO sometime in the first half of 2019, and transition into a senior advisory role for the company. During that time, Cirrus will conduct an internal and external search for a new CEO.

On 4 June 2019, Cirrus announced that former Tesla, James Hardie and Bang & Olufsen executive Zean Nielsen has been selected as its next CEO, marking the first time in the company's 35-year history without a Klapmeier at the helm.

== Products and features ==
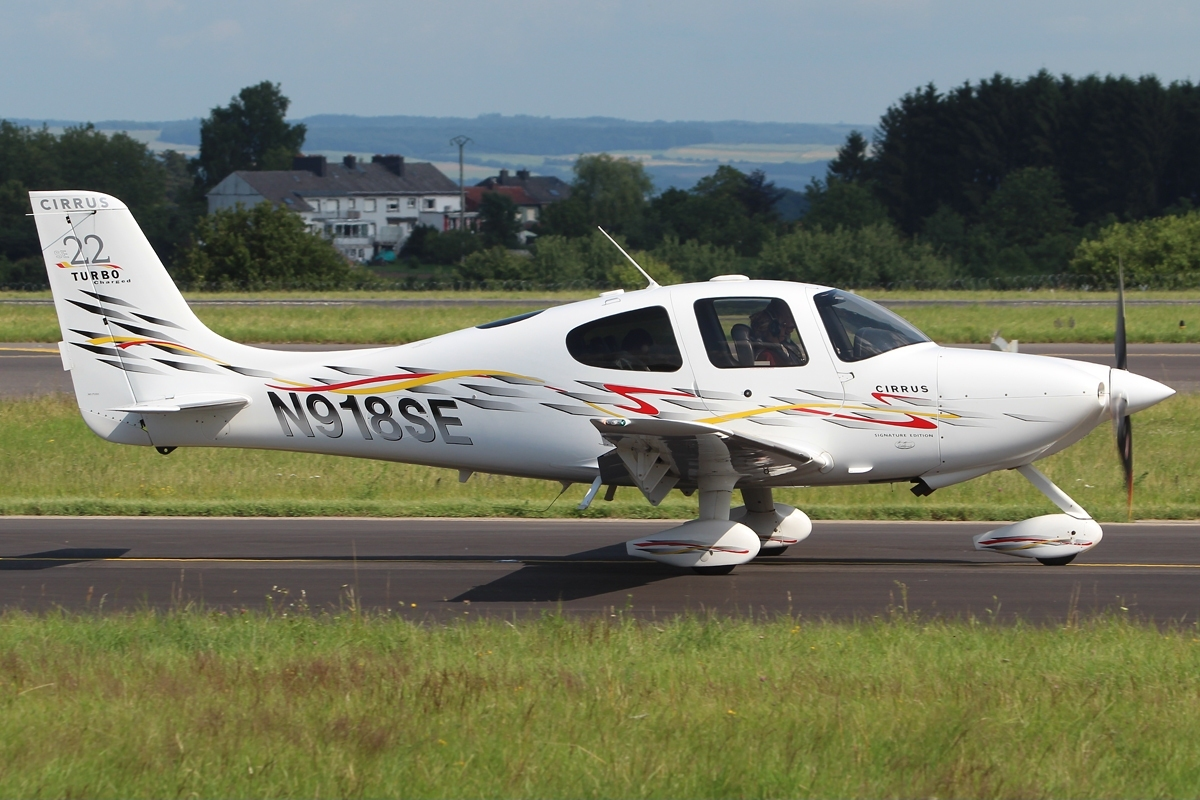
2006 model Cirrus SR22

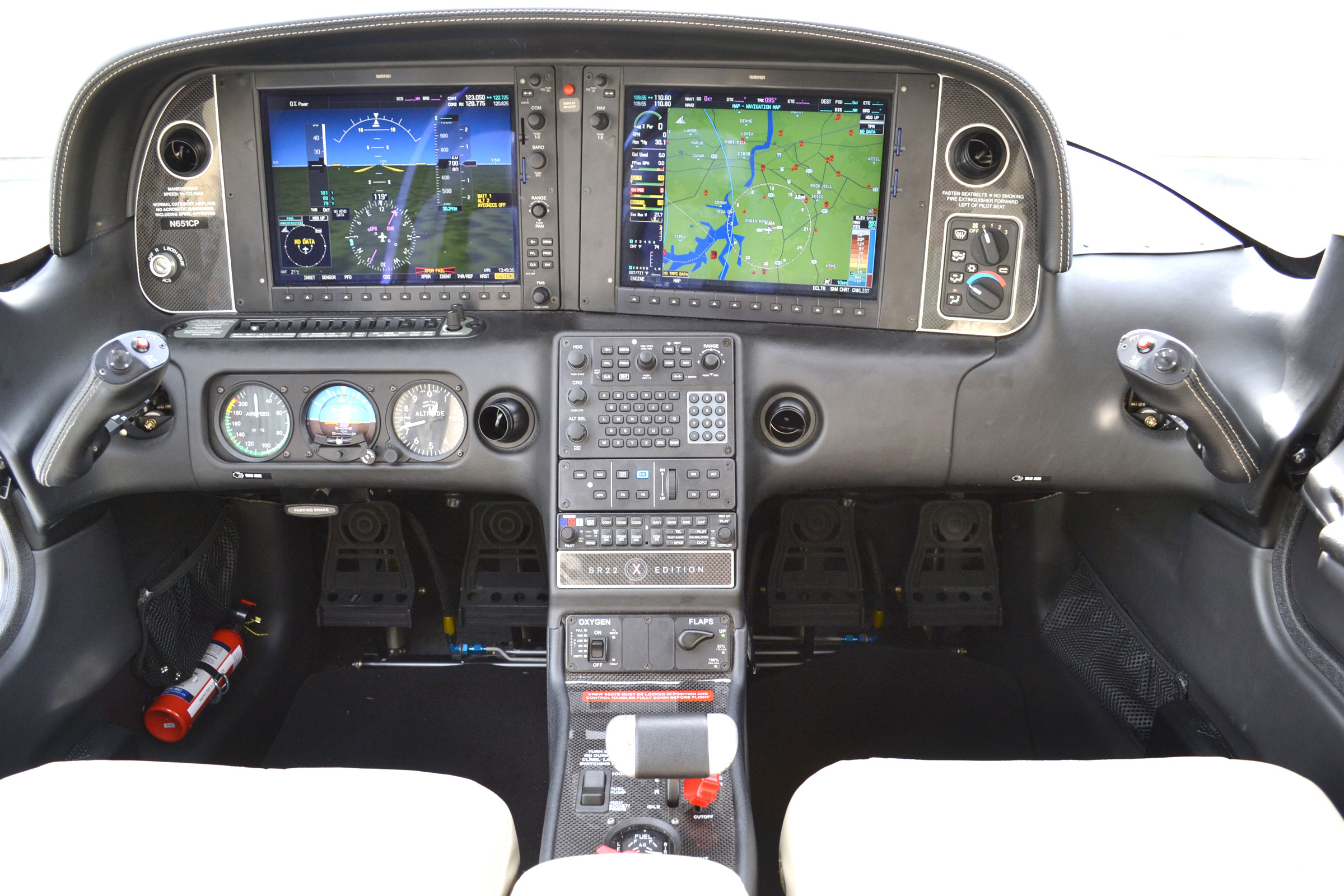
Interior of SR22 with post-2008 Cirrus Perspective avionics by Garmin

=== SR aircraft series ===
The Cirrus SR (Single Reciprocating) Series aircraft (including the SRV, SR20, SR22 and SR22T) are produced with "Cirrus Perspective" by Garmin (and previously Avidyne Entegra) integrated digital flight displays and modern avionics as standard equipment since 2008, a first in the light general aviation (GA) manufacturing industry when the Entegra instrument panel initially became available on the series starting in 2003. The aircraft are all electric - no vacuum systems are used. Redundancy is provided by dual batteries and alternators. The series originally began as a four-seat aircraft, with a smaller fifth seat added in 2013. The SR22 is also available with TKS anti-icing equipment, which has enabled flight into known icing (FIKI) conditions since 2009. The SR aircraft series was the first of its kind to come equipped with flight envelope protection in the form of an electronic "level" button, as well as "airbag seatbelts", two airbags installed in the shoulder harnesses of both the pilot and co-pilots' seat belts.

The series incorporates other unusual design elements. All SR-aircraft use a mechanical "side yoke" instead of the traditional yoke or stick flight controls, and a single power lever that adjusts both throttle and propeller RPM via a mechanical cam actuated throttle and propeller control system. The aircraft also include a leading-edge cuff on the wing for improved spin protection and 26G energy-absorbing seats for improved crashworthiness. Construction is dominated by composite materials (a technique the company has used with every model since its first design in 1988, the VK-30), with traditional aluminum being used only for flight control surfaces. Although not the first certified GA aircraft built with composites, the SR-series was the first composite aircraft produced in large numbers (over 4,000 units delivered from 1999 to 2008 alone).

The SR22T, introduced in 2010, is powered by a Continental TSIO-550-K turbocharged piston engine. Turbocharging allows the engine to maintain maximum power at higher altitudes while increasing the maximum operating altitude to 25,000 ft (7,620 m).

=== Cirrus Airframe Parachute System (CAPS) ===
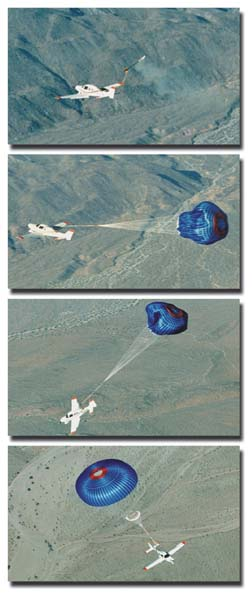
Cirrus SR20 inflight-test deployment of CAPS, 1998

SR-series aircraft are equipped with the Cirrus Airframe Parachute System (CAPS), developed in association with Ballistic Recovery Systems (BRS), a ballistic parachute deployed from the back of the aircraft. In many inflight emergencies, it allows the entire airplane to descend safely to the ground and has been credited with saving over 250 lives to date. Cirrus was the first manufacturer to receive FAA certification for production aircraft with ballistic parachute systems, and remains the only aviation company to implement the device as a standard equipment on all its models. The Klapmeier brothers decided to make CAPS standard after Alan survived a deadly mid-air collision in 1985, which inspired them to develop a new safety system for future Cirrus models that would give the pilot and passengers a way out in the worst-case scenario. It was first tested in 1998 by Air National Guard F-16 pilot and chief Cirrus test pilot Scott D. Anderson, who completed all CAPS testing that year in an SR20 prototype over the southern California desert.

Since starting deliveries in 2016, the turbofan-powered Vision SF50 also comes equipped with CAPS, making it the first jet with a whole-plane parachute to receive certification.

=== Safe Return autoland system ===
In October 2019, Cirrus became the first GA company, along with Piper Aircraft, to announce an emergency autoland system, developed by Garmin, which Cirrus calls "Safe Return" on the Vision SF50. It initiates at the push of a button and allows landing on runways over 5,836 ft (1,779 m) without any human input. The SF50 became the first jet, and third GA aircraft, to become certified with the system, earning certification in August 2020.

In May 2025, Cirrus added Safe Return to the SR series as the first piston aircraft equipped with emergency autoland.

=== Aircraft ===
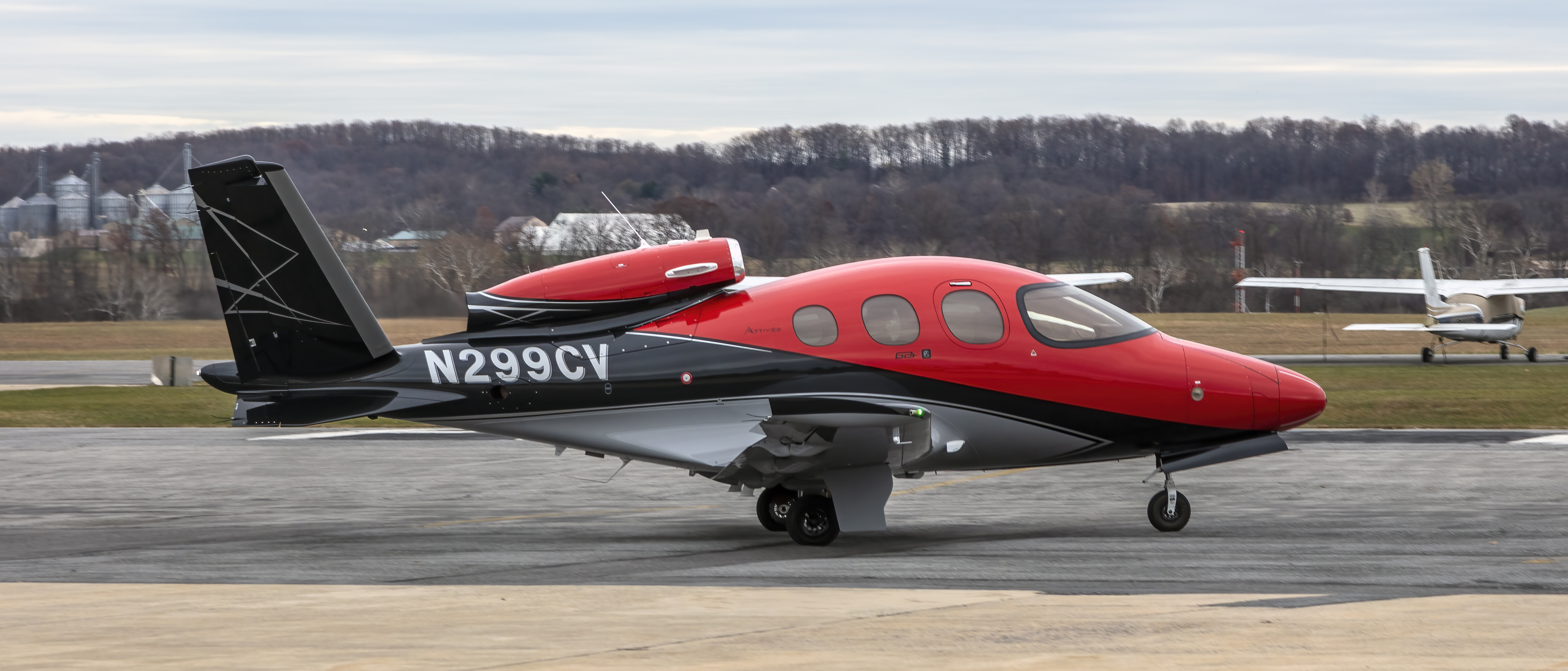
2021 model Cirrus Vision SF50

Model name	First flight	Number built	Type
Cirrus TRAC/SR10	2025		Single piston-engine three-seat trainer set for a 2027 introduction
Cirrus SR20	1995	1,932+	Single piston-engine four or five-seat utility monoplane
Cirrus SR22/22T	2000	8,246+	Single piston-engine four or five-seat utility monoplane
Cirrus SR Sport		0	Unbuilt single piston-engine two-seat ultralight sport plane
Cirrus ST50	1994	2	Single turboprop-engine five-seat airplane based on VK-30
Cirrus Vision SF50	2008	615+	Single jet-engine five or seven-seat business monoplane
Cirrus VK-30	1988	~13	Single piston-engine five-seat homebuilt monoplane
