= NCFlyPorts =

Education program in North Carolina, USA

NCFlyPorts is a program sponsored by the North Carolina Department of Transportation's Aviation Division. It was created to educate the public regarding the availability of "on demand air service" to and from small community airports throughout North Carolina and the entire Southeast via air taxi service. It is funded by the USDOT's Small Community Air Service Enhancement Program (SCASD), the NCDOT, and 11 community airports in North Carolina.
