= Wondair =

Spanish charter airline

Wondair On Demand Aviation
IATA	ICAO	Call sign
-	WNR	WONDAIR
- Founded: 1990
- Ceased operations: 2015
- Hubs: Valencia Airport
- Headquarters: Valencia, Spain
- Website: wondair.com

Wondair (Wondair On Demand Aviation) was an air charter company based in Valencia, Spain. It operates on demand business and executive services. Its main base was Valencia Airport while the management office was located in the Valencian town of Alzira.

== Fleet ==
As of December 2006 the Wondair fleet includes:

- Cessna 560 Citation Ultra
- Raytheon B200 King Air
