= Balen-Keiheuvel Aerodrome =

Balen-Keiheuvel Aerodrome Aeroclub Keiheuvel
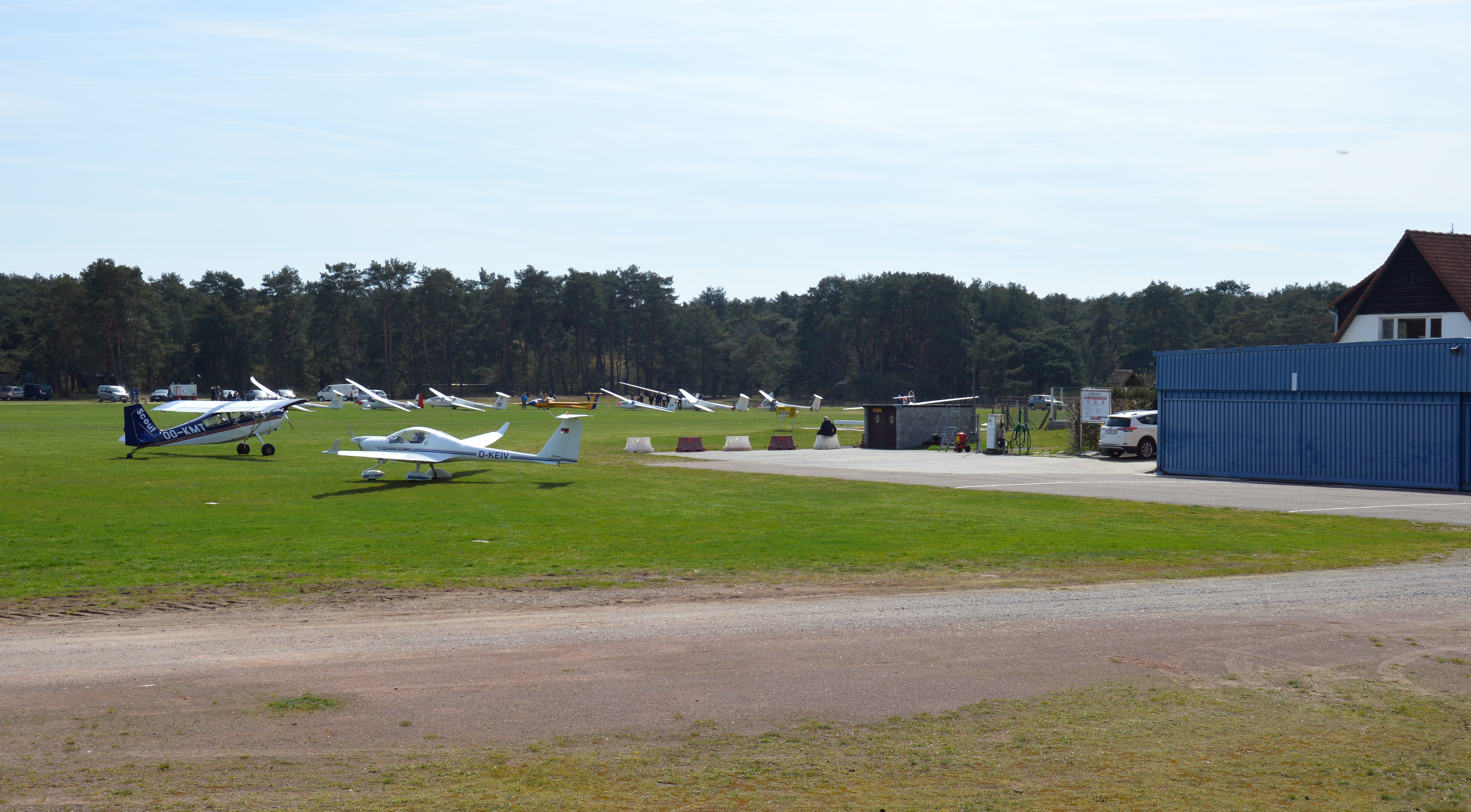
- IATA: none; ICAO: EBKH

Summary
- Airport type: Private
- Operator: Aeroclub Keiheuvel
- Location: Keiheuvel-Balen, Belgium
- Elevation AMSL: 123 ft / 37 m
- Coordinates: 51°10′51″N 5°13′15″E
- Website: aeroclub-keiheuvel.be

Map
- Location in Belgium

Runways
Direction	Length		Surface
Direction	m	ft	Surface
07/25	690	2,264	Grass
- Sources: Belgian AIP

Balen-Keiheuvel Aerodrome (ICAO: EBKH) is a private general aviation airfield located in Keiheuvel-Balen, a municipality of Belgium. Aircraft on the airport include both motorized aircraft and gliders.

== See also ==
- Transportation in Belgium
