= Air taxi =

Small commercial aircraft which makes short flights on demand

An air taxi is a small commercial aircraft that makes short flights on demand.

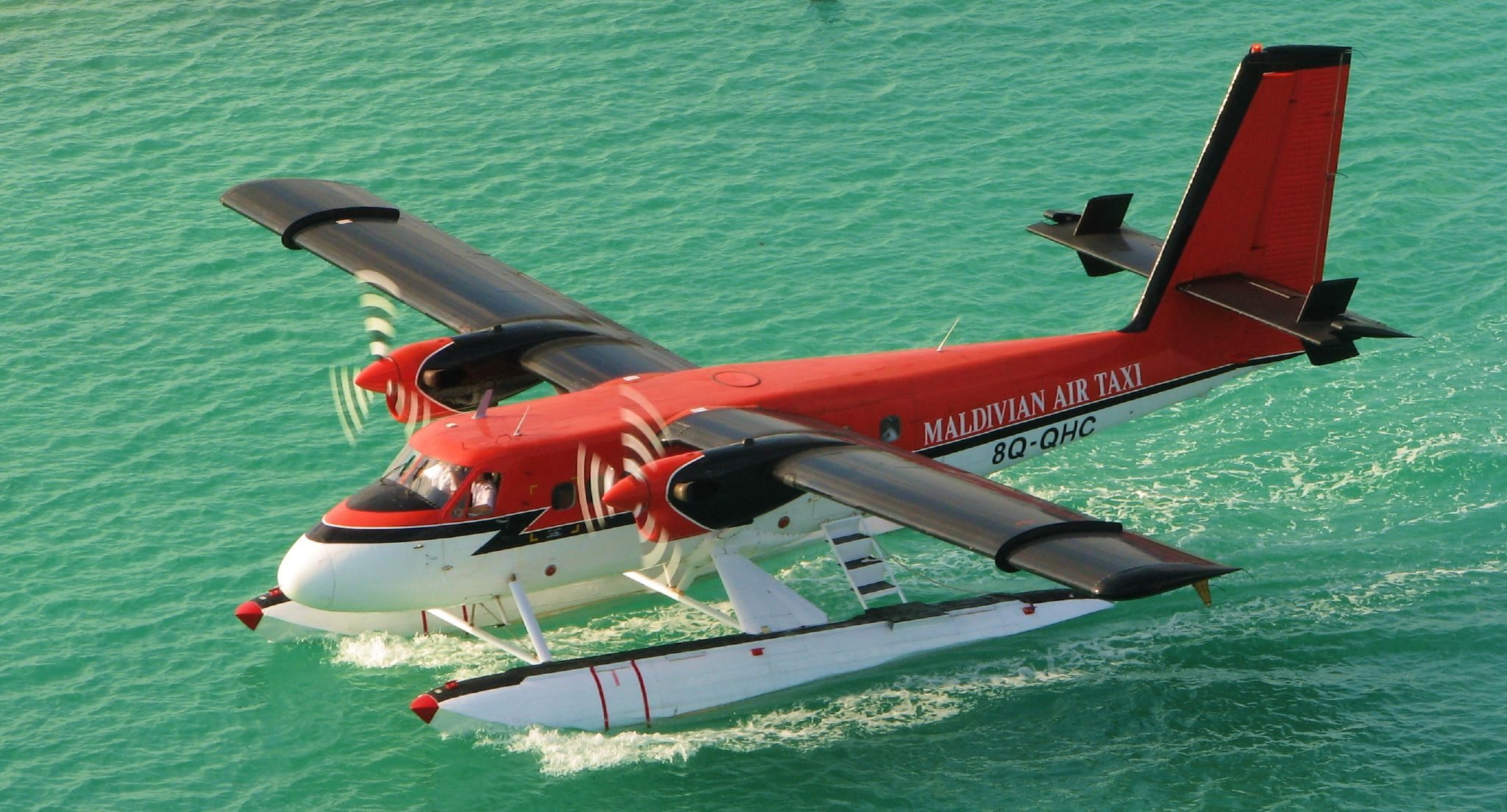
A DHC-6 Twin Otter of Maldivian Air Taxi in Malé, Maldives

== History ==
The concept of air taxis existed as early as the 1910s. This concept goes back as early as 1917 with Glenn Curtiss' prototype, the auto-plane. Furthermore, during the 1920s to the late 1950s, various inventors created their own prototypes. Such inventors included Henry Ford, Waldo Waterman, and Moulton "Molt" Taylor. However, each of these projects faced challenges which included crashes, lack of funding, or technical difficulties. After all this experimentation and challenges faced, the urban air mobility industry had shifted focus on "improving safety and enhancing economic and operational efficiency of vertical flight".

The next phase from the 1950s to the late 1980s included urban air mobility services through the use of helicopters within major cities such as Los Angeles, San Francisco, and New York; however, the challenges of fuel costs and safety have made it difficult to commercialize using helicopters for urban air mobility.

During the 2010s to the present day, there was the "reemergence" of catering to "on-demand aviation services" that focus on goods delivery and passenger mobility such as the ability of booking a helicopter through a smartphone. BLADE, SkyRyde, and UberCopter are just some examples of companies that are offering passenger mobility helicopter services. Additionally, NASA and the United States Air Force initiated a focus to improve safety and scalability of UAM systems through the launch of the AAM National Campaign and Agility Prime. NASA showed this initiative by signing agreements with 17 companies to test UAM vehicles and systems. On the other hand, the U.S. Air Force's Agility Prime program demonstrates a focus on scalability through exploring vertical flight opportunities for military applications.

The air taxi market is an application of Advanced Air Mobility (AAM) – air transportation systems that utilize advanced technologies such as vertical takeoffs, autonomous capabilities, or fully-electric systems – for short to mid range on-demand flights. Many AAM vehicles are designed for Short Takeoff and Landing (STOL) or Vertical Takeoff and Landings (VTOL); electric VTOL aircraft are also prominent, known as eVTOLs.

Another noteworthy term for the air taxi market is urban air mobility (UAM), which is a sub-category of AAM focused on applications in urban settings.

== Development ==
=== Designs ===
Air taxi designs vary to accommodate various numbers of passengers. NASA has proposed various designs that could accommodate various numbers of passengers such as: single, six, and fifteen passenger air taxi aircraft. NASA has analyzed three possible options of vehicle design to outweigh the most optimal model for missions, in which they compare mathematical statistics for a hybrid, turboshaft, and electrical aircraft models. Whereas for more of a single path commercial use the European Union Aviation Safety Agency propose that electrical aircraft will be the main source of power for air taxis, to ensure that air taxis are being designed with the new electronical technology.

Various designs have been considered when it comes to the development of air taxis. Development of designs are used for different purposes in based on the following criteria

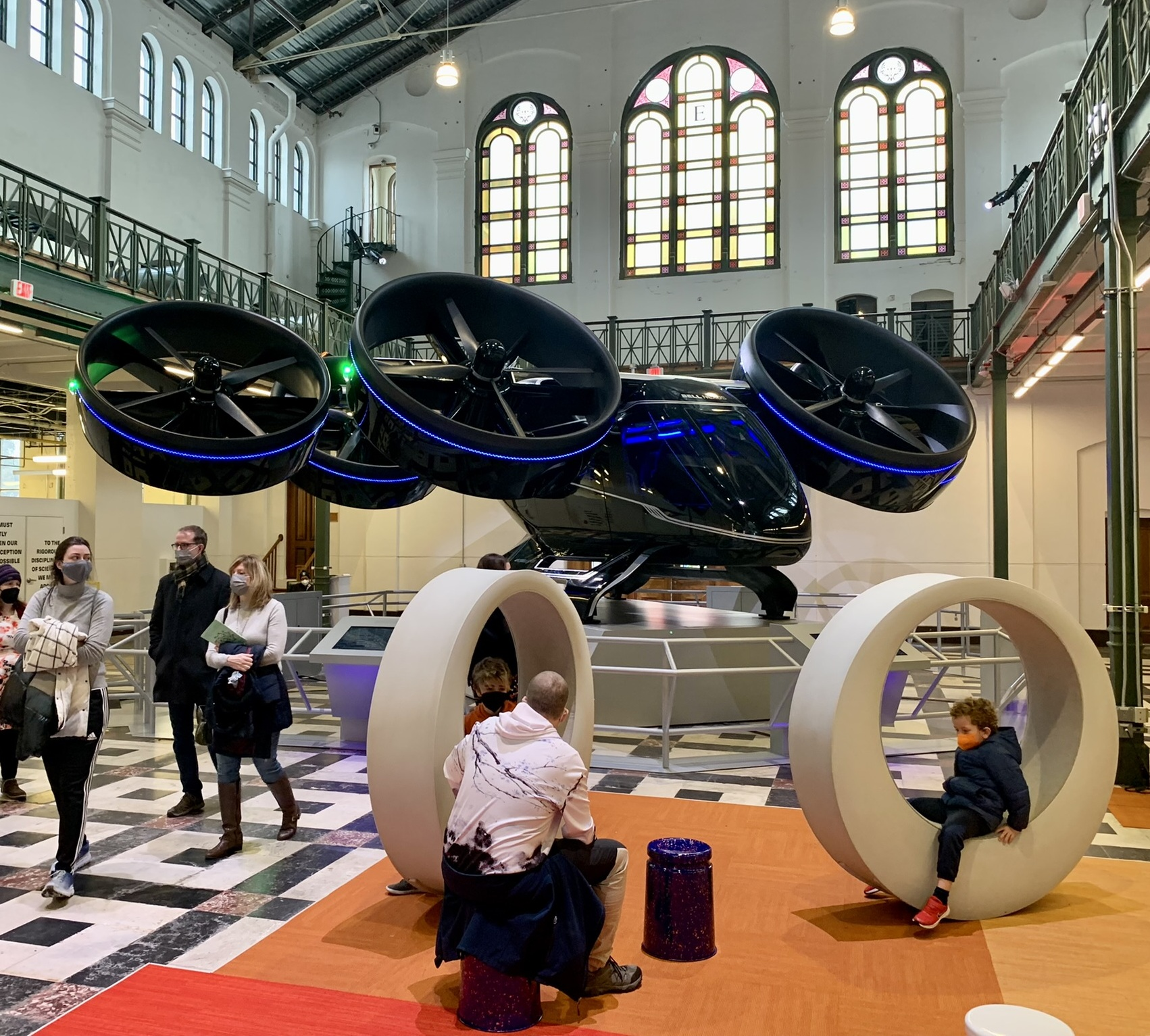
Bell Nexus Air Taxi

==== Types of propellers ====
1. Quadrotor
2. Side by side helicopter propellers – two propellers on opposite ends
3. Tiltwing – four propellers line up horizontally

For the most part, air taxis will be designed to be electrical and function as helicopters. Many companies such as Joby Aviation have partnered with the military to learn and redesign operations of the aircraft. Joby's partnership with the military allows for various testing within the military environment, such as transportation of cargo, medical evacuations, etc. Air taxis can be used for both commercial and private use to improve air mobility. The purpose will determine designs and technology, in which for the most part commercial use is predicted to be created as autonomous aircraft.

== Markets ==
One market analysis estimated early market demand for airport shuttles (AAMs along set routes to, from, and between airports) and air taxis to be 55,000 daily trips and 82,000 daily passengers – an annual value of US$2.5 billion. Facilitating an on-demand air taxi market similar to current ride-hailing services requires the infrastructure for highly prevalent vertistops, areas that can support vertical landings and takeoffs based on consumer demand rather than predetermined routes, which may be a barrier for profitable implementation by 2030. Moreover, market studies point to infrastructure as among the most significant constraints for the air taxi market. It is also predicted that 98% of demand for air taxis is created from ground transportation trips longer than 30 minutes. Because of these factors, areas with a high-density of wealthy individuals or businesses, such as New York or San Francisco, may offer a shorter path to profitability for air taxi services. San Francisco specifically is viewed as a possible early market for air taxis because of its large population of frequent, long-distance commuters. Some market studies assume autonomous operation of air taxis for their predictions, current FAA implementation plans for AAM constrains the scope of AAMs to aircraft operated with a pilot on board.

== Regulations ==
=== United States ===
Air taxi and air charter operations are governed by 14 CFR Part 135 and 14 CFR part 298 of the Federal Aviation Regulations (FAR).

In July 2023, the FAA released Version 1.0 of the Advanced Air Mobility (AAM) Implementation Plan, describing short-term implementation goals for AAM. These goals are centered around Innovate28, aka I28 – a joint program between the United States government and the AAM industry created by the FAA for the purpose of developing early stage AAM utilization in at least one site by 2028. First efforts by the program anticipate utilizing existing airports and helipads with potential modifications – such as parking stations, charging ports, or weather monitoring capabilities – being added as needed.

=== Canada ===
In Canada, air taxi operations are regulated by Transport Canada under Canadian Aviation Regulation 703. The Canadian definition of air taxi includes all commercial single-engine aircraft, multi-engine helicopters flown by visual flight rules by one pilot and all multi-engine, non-turbo-jet aircraft, with a maximum take-off weight 8,618 kg (18,999 lb) or less and nine or fewer passenger seats, that are used to transport people or goods or for sightseeing.

== Company projections ==
Companies such as Uber claim air taxis and other VTOL aircraft will enable rapid and reliable transportation. Uber plans to develop new skyports, which may provide multidimensional routes opposed to traditional routes taken by current forms of transportation. To achieve efficiency, the current proposed plan is to use the top decks of parking structures and current existing helipads to create multiple skyports for the future. EVTOL developer TCab Tech raised 20 million dollars in its first round of funding. The company has received more than 200 provisional orders for its E20 model, in which Chinese media has reported that the E20 will COST $970,000 per unit. Other companies, such as the German consultancy Roland Berger, have predicted about 3,000 flying taxis will be in operation by 2025 with as many as 98,000 by 2050.

=== United Arab Emirates ===
In 2023, a concept for a flagship vertiport in Dubai, developed by Foster + Partners in collaboration with Skyports Infrastructure, was presented at the World Government Summit. The design received the endorsement of His Highness Sheikh Mohammed bin Rashid Al Maktoum, who presented an award for the project as part of the city's strategic vision for advanced air mobility.

Following this approval, construction commenced in late 2024 on the first permanent commercial vertiport network. The infrastructure, designed by the engineering and advisory firm GHD, is located at Dubai International Airport (DXB) and is developed in partnership with the Roads and Transport Authority (RTA). The facility is engineered to support commercial eVTOL operations by 2026, featuring modular designs intended to integrate with existing airport and metro systems.

In addition, Joby Aviation plans to be in operation in New York by 2025. They plan to offer electric air taxi transport from JFK airport to downtown Manhattan. Joby Aviation also plans to offer booking on demand, similar to rideshare apps. Furthermore, in 2025, Joby and Delta Air Lines hope to launch eVTOL flights in New York and Los Angeles. Additionally, United and Archer Aviation plan to do the same in Chicago. This shift towards urban air mobility is supported by Delta Air Lines statistics that is estimating about 1,000 people a day would choose eVTOLS instead of automobiles to travel to and from the airport.

== Operators ==
- Archer Aviation
- Joby Aviation
- Airbus
- Volocopter
- Urban Air Mobility
- Hyundai

== See also ==
- Air Taxi Association
- Commercial aviation
- eVTOL
- General aviation
- Very light jet
- NCFlyPorts
- Passenger drone
- Fractional Jets
