= T27 armored car =

T27 Armored car
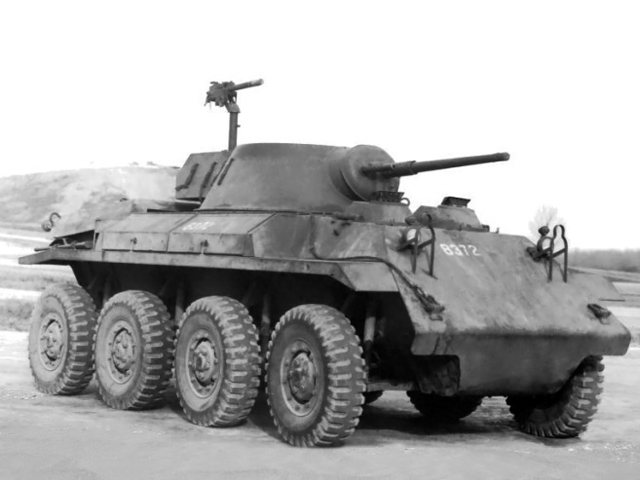
- The T27 Armored Car.
- Type: Armored car
- Place of origin: United States

Specifications
- Crew: 4
- Main armament: 37 mm M6
- Secondary armament: .30 cal machine gun
- Engine: Cadillac gasoline 8-cylinder engine
- Suspension: 8x6 wheel

The T27 Armored Car was a prototype armored car developed for the US Army in 1944 by the Studebaker Corporation. The T27 was an eight-wheeled vehicle, with the first, second and fourth pairs of wheels being powered. With a crew of four, the T27 was armed with two .30 caliber machine guns and a 37 mm cannon. Powered by a Cadillac gasoline eight-cylinder engine, two T27s were produced in 1944.

The T27's production was cancelled in favor of a competing design by Chevrolet, the T28 Armored Car.

== Development ==
The T27 was developed by the Studebaker Corporation in 1944 as a possible replacement for the M8 Greyhound. It was completed in late 1943 and was tested against the T28 Armored Car at the Aberdeen Proving Grounds. Although the T28 was found out to be more mobile than the T27, both were superior to the mobility of the M8. After more testing at Fort Riley, the T28 was found superior to the T27 and was officially designated the M38, but it was later cancelled because there was no apparent need for new armored cars after it finished testing.

== Specifications ==
Main Armament	Secondary Armament	Engine	Suspension	Crew
37 mm Gun M6	1 × .30 cal MG	One Cadillac 8-cylinder gasoline engine	8×6 wheel	Four

== See also ==
- List of U.S. military vehicles by model number
- Military technology and equipment
