= 37 mm gun M3 =

American anti-tank gun

37mm gun M3 on carriage M4
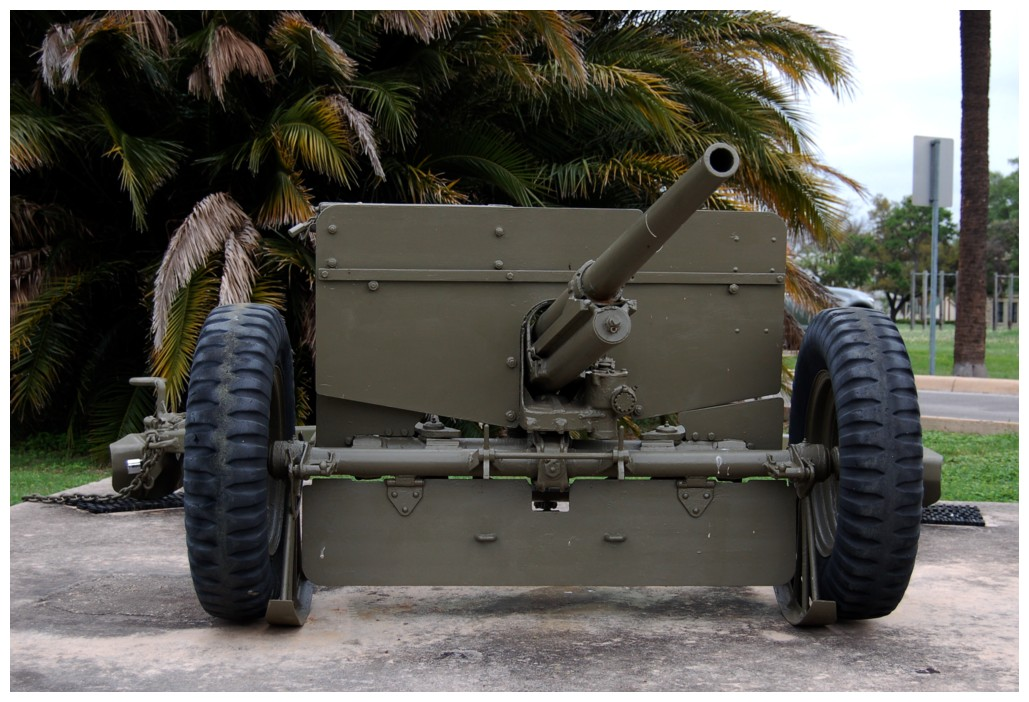
- M3 on display at Fort Sam Houston, Texas.
- Type: Anti-tank gun
- Place of origin: United States

Service history
- Used by: United States; National Revolutionary Army; Brazil; French Indochina; Viet Minh; National Guard of Nicaragua
- Wars: World War II; Second Sino-Japanese War; First Indochina War; Nicaraguan Revolution

Production history
- Designed: 1938
- Manufacturer: Gun: Watervliet Arsenal, Carriage: Rock Island Arsenal
- Produced: 1940–1943
- No. built: 18,702

Specifications
- Mass: 414 kg (912 lb)
- Length: 3.92 m (12 ft 10.3 in)
- Barrel length: overall: 2.1 m (6 ft 11 in) L/56.6 bore: 1.98 m (6 ft 6 in) L/53.5
- Width: 1.61 m (5 ft 3.4 in)
- Height: 0.96 m (3 ft 1.8 in)
- Crew: 4–6
- Shell: 37×223 mm. R
- Caliber: 37 mm (1.45 inch)
- Breech: Vertical sliding-block
- Recoil: Hydro-spring
- Carriage: Split trail
- Elevation: -10° to +15°
- Traverse: 60°
- Rate of fire: up to 25 rpm
- Muzzle velocity: up to 884 m/s (2,900 ft/s)
- Maximum firing range: 6.9 km (4.29 mi)
- Sights: telescopic, M6

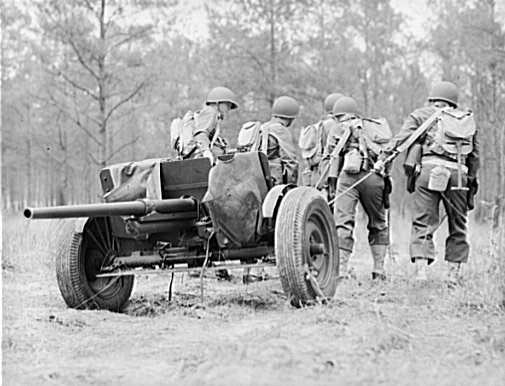
Manhandling a gun into position during training at Fort Benning, 1942. Note the raised wheel segments.

The 37 mm gun M3 is the first dedicated anti-tank gun fielded by United States forces in numbers. Introduced in 1940, it became the standard anti-tank gun of the U.S. infantry with its size enabling it to be pulled by a jeep. However, the continuing improvement of German tanks quickly rendered the 37 mm ineffective and, by 1943, it was being gradually replaced in the European and Mediterranean theaters by the more powerful British-developed 57 mm gun M1. In the Pacific, where the Japanese tank threat was less significant, the M3 remained in service until the end of the war, but some 57mm guns were issued.

Like many other light anti-tank guns, the M3 was widely used in the infantry support role and as an anti-personnel weapon, firing high-explosive and canister rounds.

The M5 and M6 tank mounted variants were used in several models of armored vehicles most notably in the Stuart light tank M3/M5, the Lee medium tank M3, and Greyhound light armored car M8. In addition, the M3 in its original version was mated to a number of other self-propelled carriages.

The inability of the 37 mm round to penetrate the frontal armor of mid-war tanks severely restricted the anti-armor capabilities of units armed with them.

== Development history ==
In the mid-1930s, the United States Army had yet to field a dedicated anti-tank artillery piece; anti-tank companies of infantry regiments were armed with .50 in (12.7 mm) machine guns. Although some consideration had been given to replacing the machine guns with a more powerful anti-tank gun, the situation began to change only after the outbreak of the Spanish Civil War. Combat experience from Spain suggested that a light anti-tank gun, such as the German 37 mm PaK 35/36, was capable of neutralizing the growing threat posed by tanks.

In January 1937, the Ordnance Committee recommended development of such a weapon; two PaK 36 guns were acquired for study. As the projected main user of the weapon, the Infantry Branch was chosen to oversee the work. They wanted a lightweight gun that could be moved around by the crew, so any ideas of using a larger caliber than that of the German gun were discarded. The 37 mm was a popular caliber of anti-tank guns in the 1930s; other anti-tank guns of the same caliber included Swedish Bofors gun, Czechoslovak vz. 34 and vz. 37, Japanese Type 94 and Type 1.

Development and testing continued until late 1938. Several variants of gun and carriage were proposed until on 15 December a combination of the T10 gun and T5 carriage was officially adopted as the 37 mm gun M3 and carriage M4. Although the weapon followed the concept of the PaK 36 and was often referred to as a copy of it, the M3 differed significantly from the German design and used different ammunition.

The gun was manufactured by Watervliet Arsenal and the carriage by Rock Island Arsenal. The first production examples of the M3 were delivered in July 1940. It took until August 1941 for production to accelerate, and some infantry antitank units were forced to use wooden mock-ups of the new gun or their original weapons (37 mm gun M1916) during the Louisiana Maneuvers and Carolina Maneuvers, and did not get their first weapons until late 1941. Production continued until October 1943.

Production of М3, numbers of pieces
Month	1940	1941	1942	1943
January		40	609	894
February			639	625
March		2	394	452
April		57	752	290
May		12	1,002	200
June		63	962	400
July	20	72	921	600
August	75	188	1,104	500
September	75	366	1,099	152
October	128	555	1,501	185
November	31	451	1,338	
December	11	446	1,491	
Total	340	2,252	11,812	4,298

Minor changes in the gun construction were introduced during production. The carriage received a modified shoulder guard and traverse controls (carriage M4A1, standardized on 29 January 1942). Although ordnance requested an upgrade of all M4 carriages to M4A1, this process was not completed. Another change was a threaded barrel end to accept a big five-port muzzle brake (gun M3A1, adopted on 5 March 1942). According to some sources, the latter was intended to avoid kicking too much dust in front of the gun, which hindered aiming; however, the brake turned out to be a safety problem when firing canister ammunition and consequently the M3A1 went into combat without the muzzle brake. Other sources state that the muzzle brake was intended to soften the recoil, and that it was dropped simply because additional recoil control measures were not really needed.

In an attempt to increase the armor penetration of the M3, several squeeze bore adapters (including the British Littlejohn adaptor) were tested; none was adopted. Experiments with rocket launchers on the M4 carriage (e.g. 4.5 in (110 mm) rocket projector T3) did not produce anything practical either.

== Description ==
The barrel was of one-piece forged construction, with uniform rifling (12 grooves, right-hand twist, one turn in 25 calibers). The breech end of the barrel was screwed into a breech ring. The breech mechanism was of standard vertical sliding-block type, but unlike the overwhelming majority of the anti-tank guns of the era, it was not semi-automatic, meaning that a crew member had to manually open and close the breech at each shot. The barrel was fitted with a hydrospring recoil system.

The carriage was of split trail type, with pneumatic tires but without any spring suspension whatsoever. Mounted on the axle next to the wheels were the "wheel segments"; these were segment-shaped supports that could be lowered to provide more stability in the firing position or raised so that they would not impede movement of the gun.

The telescopic sight on the M6 and both elevation and traverse controls were located on the left side, so one gunner was able to aim the gun. The traverse gear had a release mechanism which allowed free movement of the barrel in case a quick traverse was needed.

== Organization ==
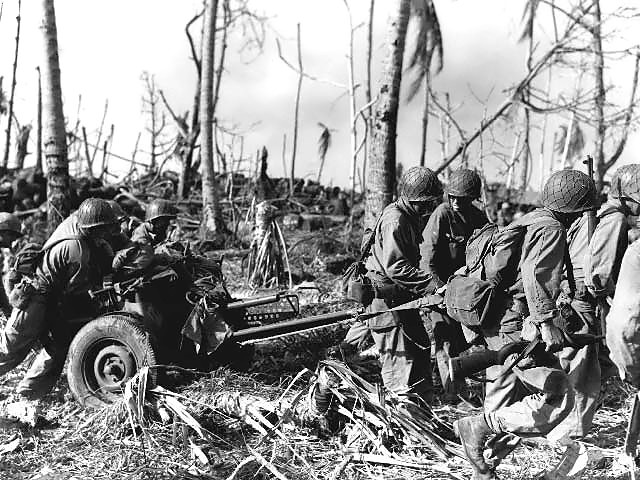
Men of the 7th Division, US Army move a gun up to the front line on Kwajalein.

=== US Army ===
Under the April 1942 organization, each infantry battalion had an anti-tank platoon with four 37 mm guns (1/4 ton trucks, better known as jeeps, were authorized as prime movers) and each regiment an anti-tank company with twelve (towed by 3/4 ton trucks). Each of the four divisional artillery battalions possessed six anti-tank guns, the combat engineering battalion had nine pieces (towed by M2 halftracks); in addition, the division's headquarters company had four (towed by 3/4 ton trucks) and the divisional maintenance company two.

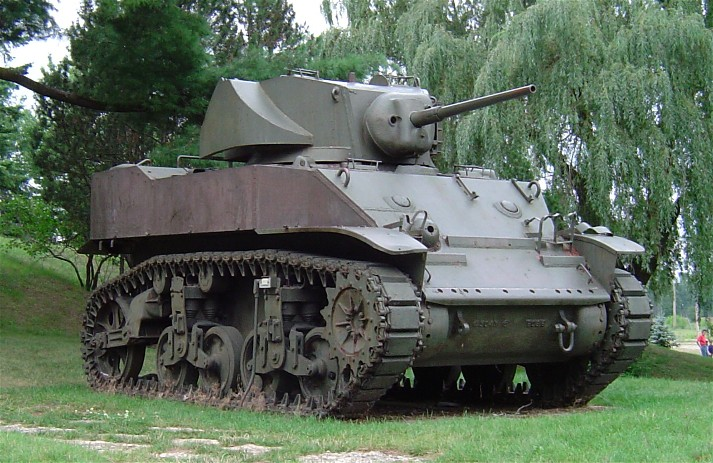
A 37 mm gun on a M5A1 Stuart tank

In 1941, provisional antitank battalions had been formed from divisional or brigade anti-tank weapons (producing companies armed with 37 mm guns and 75 mm guns), in December 1941, these battalions became permanent and were reorganized as independent tank destroyer battalions. The towed guns of many battalions were replaced with self-propelled ones as soon as the latter became available.

In 1942, the first airborne divisions were formed. According to their October 1942 organizational structure, an airborne division had 44 37 mm anti-tank guns: four in divisional artillery (AA/AT battery of parachute field artillery battalion), 24 in the AA/AT battalion, and eight in each of two glider infantry regiments; parachute infantry regiments did not have anti-tank guns. In practice, airborne divisions often had only one glider infantry regiment and therefore 36 guns.

37 mm guns were also issued to the infantry regiments of the only mountain division formed in the U.S.: the 10th Mountain Division.

Finally, U.S. armored divisions under the March 1942 organization possessed 68 37 mm anti-tank guns. Of these, 37 belonged to the armored infantry regiment (four in each company and one in regiment HQ); 27 to the armored engineer battalion; three to the divisional train and one to division HQ.

=== US Marine Corps ===
Under the D-series Tables of Organization (TO) from 1 July 1942, the role of AT weapons in Marine Corps service was officially entrusted to 20 mm automatic guns, which were in the regimental weapons company (three platoons) and the battalion weapons company (one platoon). In practice, units used the World War I-era 37 mm M1916 for training. They were equipped with the M3 (four in each platoon) before being sent to the frontline. Additionally, a divisional special weapons battalion was equipped with self-propelled 37 mm GMC M6.

Under the E-series TO from 15 April 1943, self-propelled guns in the divisional special weapons battalion were replaced with eighteen 37 mm towed guns in three batteries of six; an infantry regiment had a weapons company with 12, in three platoons of four. The battalion-level AT guns were removed. In total, a division possessed 54 pieces. The F-series TO from 5 May 1944 removed the special weapons battalion from the divisional organization, resulting in a total of 36 guns per division. The subsequent G-series TO reduced regimental weapons companies to two platoons, meaning 24 pieces per division. Although the G-series TO was only adopted on 4 September 1945, in practice in some divisions this change was introduced early in 1945.

=== Other operators ===
The only major lend lease recipient of the M3 was the Chinese National Revolutionary Army (1,669 pieces). The gun was also supplied to Bolivia (4), Canada (3), Chile (198), Colombia (4), Cuba (1), El Salvador (9), France (130), Paraguay (12), United Kingdom (78), Soviet Union (63), Nicaragua (9), and other countries. Some nations still had it in service in the early 1970s.

== Combat service ==
=== As an infantry anti-tank gun ===
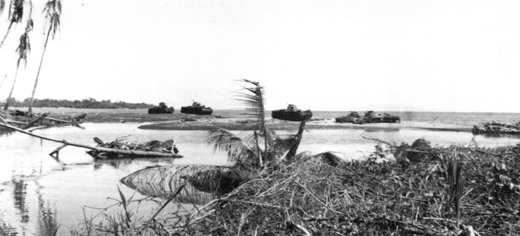
Japanese tanks knocked out by 37 mm guns near the mouth of the Matanikau River, Guadalcanal.

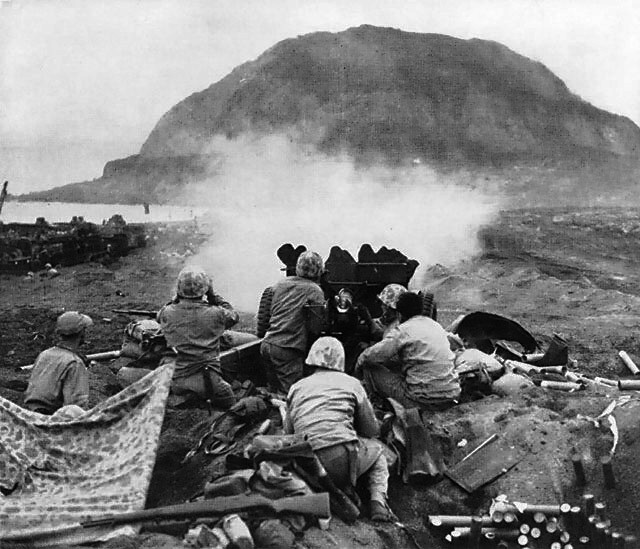
The M3 fires against Japanese cave positions in at Iwo Jima. Note modified shield with irregular top edge.

The M3 saw action for the first time during the defense of the Philippines in December 1941. It went on to become a factor in the Guadalcanal Campaign, where it was successfully employed against both Japanese armor and infantry. Throughout the war it remained effective against Japanese vehicles, which were thinly armored and were rarely committed in large groups. The light weight of the gun made it easy to move through difficult terrain; for example, when attacked by Japanese tanks on Betio during the Battle of Tarawa, Marines were able to heave the M3 over the 5 ft (1.5 m)-high seawall. While high-explosive and canister ammunition proved useful in stopping Japanese infantry attacks, against enemy fortifications the M3 was only somewhat effective because of its small high-explosive projectile. Its overall effectiveness and ease of use meant the gun remained in service with the Marine Corps and with some army units in the Pacific until the end of the war. Unhappy with the unusually low shield of the M3, some Marine Corps units extended it to provide better protection. These extensions sometimes had a scalloped top edge, intended to improve camouflage. A standard kit was tested in 1945, but was never issued.

The experience of the M3 in the North African Campaign was completely different. The gun was not powerful enough to deal with late production German Panzer III and IV tanks. After the nearly disastrous Battle of Kasserine Pass in February 1943, reports from some of the involved units mentioned 37 mm projectiles "bouncing off like marbles" from the turret and front armor of German medium tanks and proclaimed the gun "useless unless you have gun crews with the guts to stand and shoot from 100 yards". The Army was initially uncertain if these reports reflected the obsolescence of the weapon, or whether unrefined tactics and lack of experience were to blame. (Note: The situation mirrored German experience with their 3.7 cm Pak 36, which was nicknamed Heeresanklopfgerät (literally "army door-knocking device") by its crews for its inability to affect Soviet T-34 tanks aside from notifying its presence by futilely bouncing rounds off its armour, regardless of the angle or distance.) Yet, on 26 May 1943, a new organization had the M3 replaced by the 57 mm Gun M1 (the U.S.-produced version of the British 6-pounder gun), (Note: In service with the British Army since 1942) with Dodge 1½ ton trucks as prime movers. Only by spring 1944 did the 57 mm gun reach the battlefield in large numbers.

Meanwhile, the Italian campaign was launched, and M3 guns saw action from the day of the Sicily landing on 10 July 1943. That day the 37 mm guns demonstrated once again both their effectiveness against pre-war tanks—when they helped to repel an attack by Italian Renault R 35s—and inability to cope with modern threats in a subsequent encounter with Tiger Is from the Hermann Göring division. The Italian theater had a lower priority for reequipment than Northwest Europe, and some M3s were still in use in Italy in late 1944.

By mid-1944, the M3 had fallen out of favor even with airborne troops, despite their strong preference for compact and lightweight weapon systems. The Airborne Command had rejected the 57 mm M1 in the summer of 1943 claiming its unfitness for airlifting and the Table of Organisation and Equipment (TO&E) of February 1944 still had airborne divisions keeping their 37 mm guns. Nevertheless, the 82nd and 101st Airborne Divisions were reequipped with British-manufactured 6-pounder gun (57 mm) on carriage Mk III (designed to fit into the British Horsa glider) for the Normandy airdrops. This change was officially introduced in the TO&E of December 1944.

=== As a tank gun ===
The 37mm gun is essentially an antimechanized weapon... 37mm guns will be disposed to protect the flanks and rear of the (Cavalry Reconnaissance) Squadron against mechanized attack and also, in the base of fire, to support the attack. Armor-piercing ammunition is effective against mechanized vehicles, matérial, and weapons. High Explosive ammunition is effective against personnel, light matérial, automatic weapons, and mortars.

— FM 2-30 Cavalry Field Manual - Cavalry Mechanized Reconnaissance Squadron, March 29, 1943, Page 71.

The 37 mm gun was used as the primary armament for M3/M5 Stuart light tanks and M8 Greyhound armored cars. AP rounds from these guns could defeat light enemy armor, including all Japanese and Italian armor, German half-tracks and armored cars, and most surfaces of tanks and early self-propelled guns based on the German Panzer II, Panzer III, and early Panzer IV chassis, but were useless against later Panzer IV, Panzer VI (Tiger) tanks and the frontal armor of Panzer V (Panther) tanks. It was also similarly useless against later, more heavily armored self-propelled guns and Jagdpanzer tank destroyers. The HE rounds were not powerful enough for effective infantry support in most situations. The rounds were enough, however, to attack enemy light reconnaissance units, and both the M3/M5 Stuart and M8 Greyhound were restricted to reconnaissance for the majority of the war in Europe. Canister rounds were often used to good effect against Japanese infantry in many battles, such as Bloody Ridge.

There were also serious issues with the gun's ability to function effectively in the infantry support role. The 37mm HE round had 39 grams (0.085 lb) of TNT, producing an explosive power of 161 Kilojoules. By way of contrast, the HE round from a Sherman 75mm gun had 667 grams (1.47 lb) of TNT, producing 2790 Kilojoules, while the modern 40mm shell from M203 grenade launchers has 32 grams (0.07 lb) of Comp B, producing an explosive power of 134 Kilojoules.

The M3 was phased out of U.S. service soon after the end of the war.

== Variants ==
- Test variants:
  - T3 – the first prototype.
  - T7 – a prototype with semi-automatic horizontal sliding-block breech.
  - T8 – a prototype with Nordenfelt eccentric screw breech.
  - T10 – standardized as M3 (1938) – an adopted version, with manual vertical block breech.
- Model variants
  - M3 towed version, manual breech.
    - M3A1 (1942) – version with threaded barrel end to accept a muzzle brake, which was never issued.
  - M5 (1939) – tank mounted variant with shorter barrel.
  - M6 (1940) – tank mounted variant with barrel of the original length and with semi-automatic breech.
- Carriage variants:
  - T1, T1E1 – prototypes.
  - T5, standardized as M4 – first adopted version.
  - M4A1 (1942) – carriage with improved traverse controls.
  - In 1942, the Airborne Command requested a version with removable trails. A prototype was tested, but in 1943 the project was dropped as unnecessary.

At least in one case, Fifth Army Ordnance in Italy fitted the gun experimentally with fifteen 4.5 in (110 mm) aircraft rockets, in five clusters of three, mounted above the shield.

Variants of the M3 should not be confused with other 37 mm guns in the U.S. service. Those other pieces included the M1916 infantry gun of French design (these were later used extensively as subcaliber devices for heavy artillery.), M1 antiaircraft autocannon, M4/M9/M10 aircraft-mounted autocannons, M12/M13/M14/M15 subcaliber guns.

== Self-propelled mounts ==
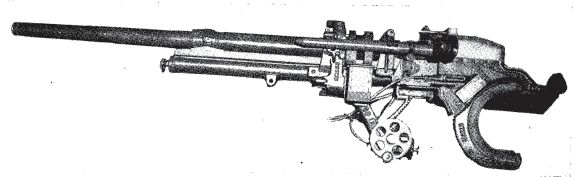
37 mm gun M5, as mounted in light tank M2A4

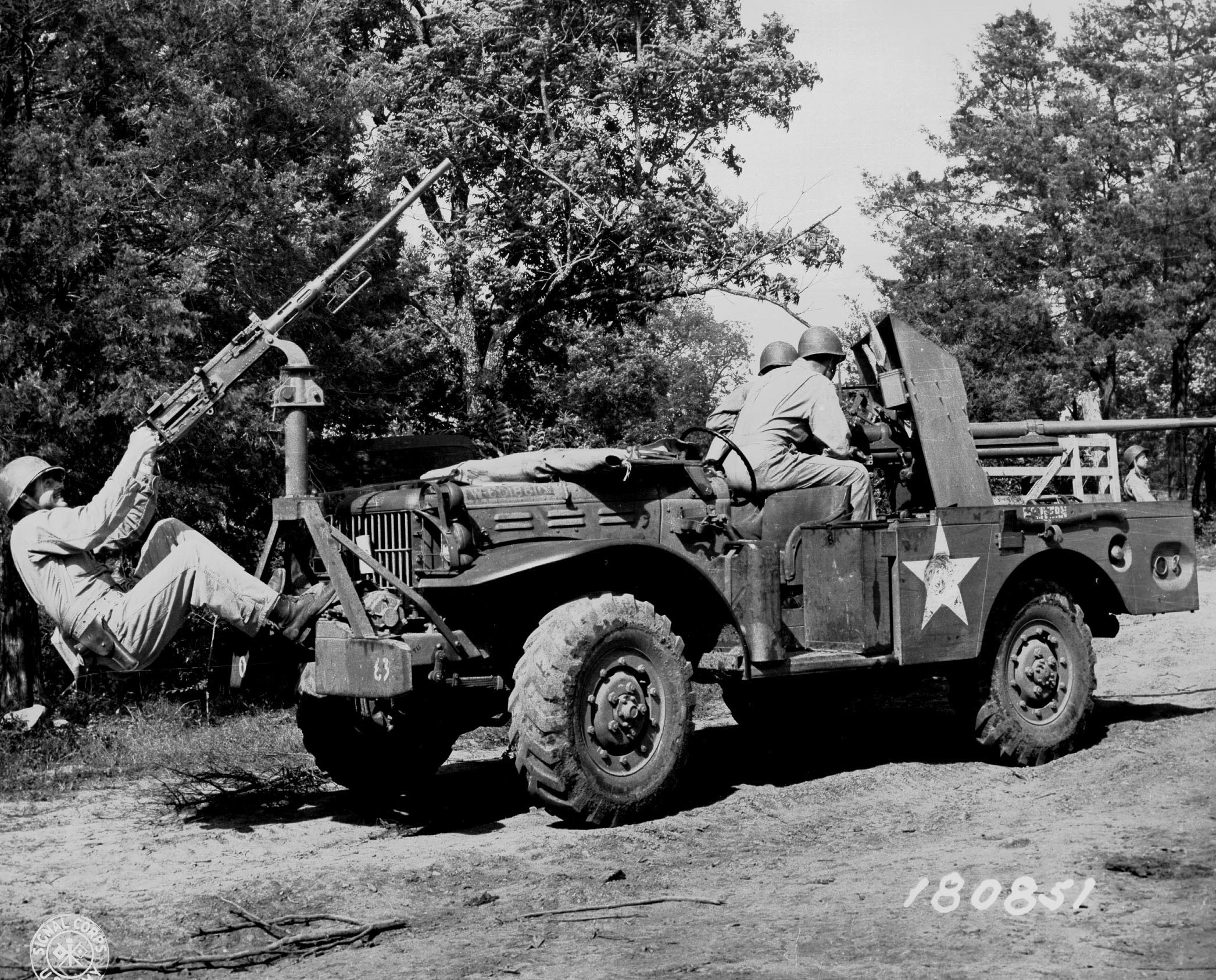
37mm GMC M6 with improvised machine gun mount.

Two tank gun variants were developed based on the barrel of the M3. The first, initially designated M3A1 but renamed M5 on 13 October 1939, was shortened by 5.1 in (130 mm) to avoid damage to the tube in wooded areas. Later, a variant with a semi-automatic breech (with empty cartridge ejection) was developed. This variant—initially designated M5E1, adopted as M6 on 14 November 1940—received a full length barrel. The tubes were interchangeable, but replacing M5 with M6 and vice versa would result in an unbalanced mount and was therefore prohibited. These guns were mounted on several models of tanks and other armored vehicles:

- Light tank M2A4: M5 in mount M20. The recoil mechanism, protruding beyond the gun mask, had to be protected by an armored casing.
- Light tank M3: M5 in mount M22, in late production vehicles M6 in mount M23. These mounts were fitted with more compact recoil mechanism, eliminating the need for the protective casing.
- Light tank M3A1, M5: M6 in mount M23.
- Light tank M3A3, M5A1: M6 in mount M44.
- Light tank (airborne) M22: M6 in mount M53.
- M3 series medium tanks (as a secondary weapon): M5 or M6 in mount M24.
- Heavy tank M6 (as a secondary weapon): M6 in mount T49.
- LVT(A)-1 "amtank": M6 in mount M44.
- 37 mm gun motor carriage T22 – eventually light armored car M8: M6 in mount M23A1; the competing designs 37 mm gun motor carriage T43 / light armored car T21 and 37 mm gun motor carriage T23 / light armored car T23 mounted the same weapon.
- Armored car T13.
- Armored car T17: M6 in mount M24.
- Armored car T17E1 in the "Staghound Mk I" configuration: M6 in mount M24A1.
- The first pilot of the armored car T18: M6. The production variant T18E2 received the 57 mm M1.
- Armored car T19: M6 in mount M23A1.
- Armored car T27: M6 in mount M23A1 modified.
- Armored car T28 / M38: M6 in mount M23A2.
- British Humber armoured car Mk IV: M6.

Versions of the gun in turret mounts were also used in the Medium Tank T5 Phase III (T3 barrel, mount T1), in the Medium Tank M2 / M2A1 (M3 barrel, M2A1: mount M19), and in the 37 mm gun motor carriage T42 (mount M22).

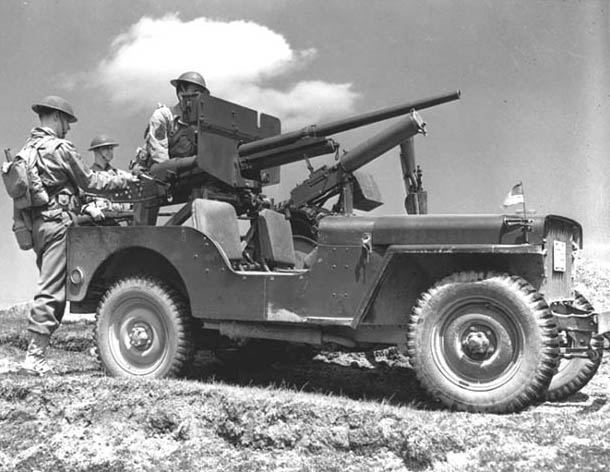
Soldiers of the U.S. 3rd Infantry on maneuvers, 1942. Their Willys / Ford jeep is fitted with M3 on a pedestal mount.

In addition, the M3 on different pedestal mounts was mated to a number of other vehicles, resulting in an assortment of 37 mm gun motor carriages. Only the M6 reached mass production.

- 37 mm gun motor carriage T2 (Bantam jeep).
- 37 mm gun motor carriage T8 (Ford 4x4 "Swamp Buggy").
- 37 mm gun motor carriage T13, T14 (Willys 6x6 "Super Jeep").
- 37 mm gun motor carriage T21 / M4 / M6 (Fargo 3/4 ton 4x4 truck).
- 37 mm gun motor carriage T33 (Ford 3/4 ton 4x4 cargo carrier).
- M3A1E3 scout car.
- The gun was sometimes mounted on M2 half-track, M29 Weasel and on the 1/4 ton Willys MB / Ford GPW jeep (see photo on the right).

On several occasions, the M3 was mounted on PT boats to increase their firepower. One of these boats was John F. Kennedy's PT-109. The gun with its wheels removed was mounted on wooden planks nailed to the deck.

== Ammunition ==
The M3 utilized fixed ammunition. Projectiles were fitted with a 37x223R cartridge case, designated Cartridge Case M16. Available projectiles included armor-piercing, high-explosive and canister. 1943 Soviet analysis described armor-piercing shots as modern, but criticized the M63 HE shell, claiming its M58 base fuze didn't work properly in tests.

Available ammunition
Type	Model	Weight, kg (round/projectile)	Filler	Muzzle velocity, m/s (M3&M6/M5)
AP-T	AP M74 Shot	1.51 / 0.87	–	884 / 870
APCBC-T	APC M51 Shot	1.58 / 0.87	–	884 / 870
HE	HE M63 Shell	1.42 / 0.73	TNT, 39 g	792 / 782
HE	HE Mk II Shell	1.23 / 0.56	TNT, 27 g	
Canister	Canister M2	1.58 / 0.88	122 steel balls	762 / 752
Target practice with tracer	TP M51 Shot	1.54 / 0.87	–	
Drill (simulates APC M51)	Drill Cartridge M13	1.45 / 0.87	–	–
Drill (simulates HE M63)	Drill Cartridge T5	1.45 / 0.73	–	–
Blank	Blank Cartridge 10-gauge with adapter M2	0.93 / –	–	–

Armor penetration, M3 or M6, millimeters
Ammunition \ Distance, yd / m	500 / 457	1,000 / 914	1,500 / 1,371	2,000 / 1,828
AP M74 Shot (meet angle 0°)	36			
AP M74 Shot (meet angle 20°)		25		
APC M51 Shot (meet angle 0°)	61			
APC M51 Shot (meet angle 20°)		53		
APC M51 Shot (meet angle 30°, homogeneous armor)	53	46	40	35
APC M51 Shot (meet angle 30°, face-hardened armor)	46	40	38	33
Different methods of armor penetration measurement were used in different countries / periods. Therefore, direct comparison is often impossible.

Armor penetration of the M5 was about 3 mm less at all ranges.

== Gallery ==
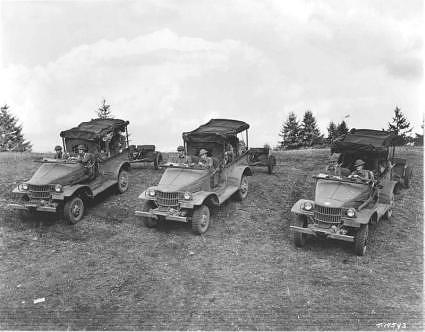
Dodge WC-4 prime movers with 37mm gun.

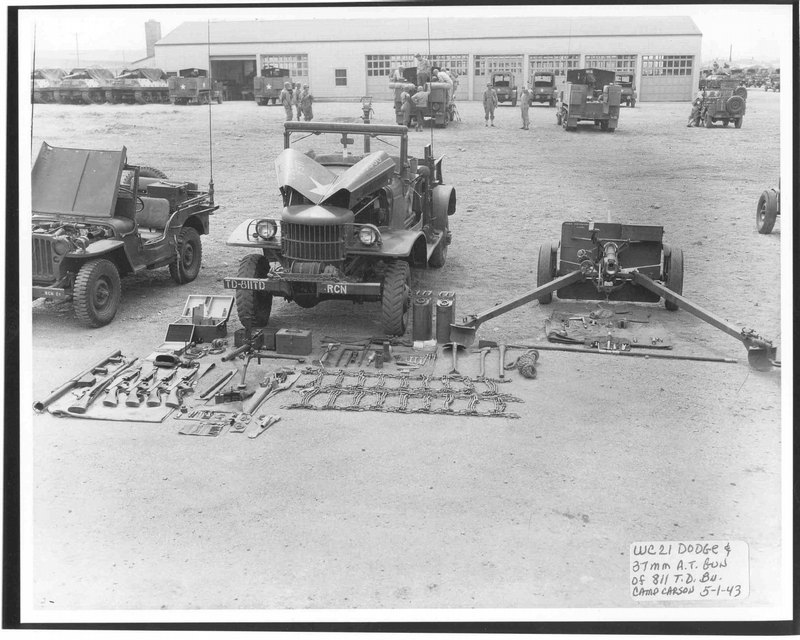
37mm with its prime mover ready for inspection.

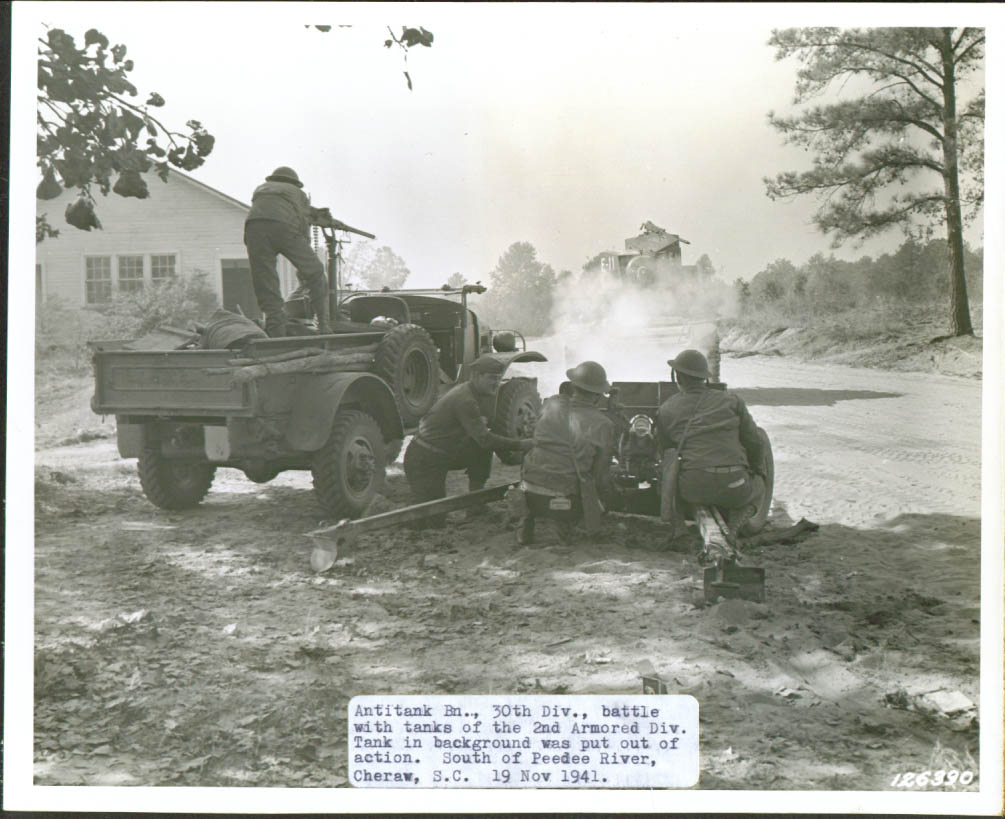
37mm and Dodge WC-4 in action.

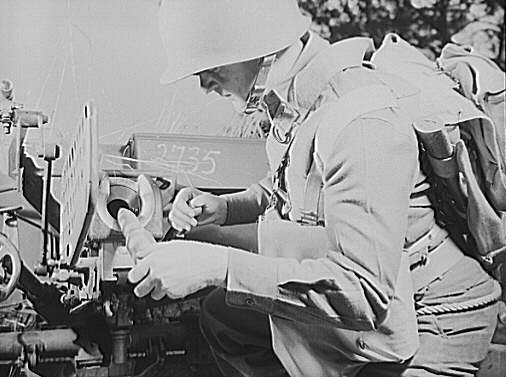
Loading the gun (crew training, Fort Benning).

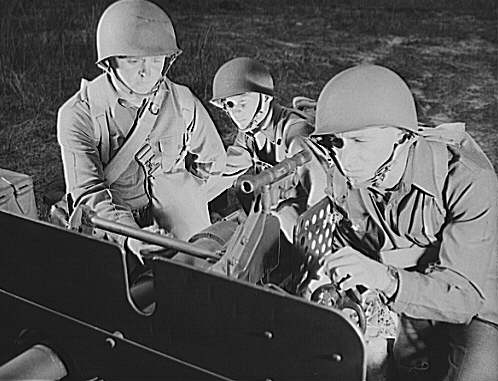
Aiming the gun (crew training, Fort Benning).

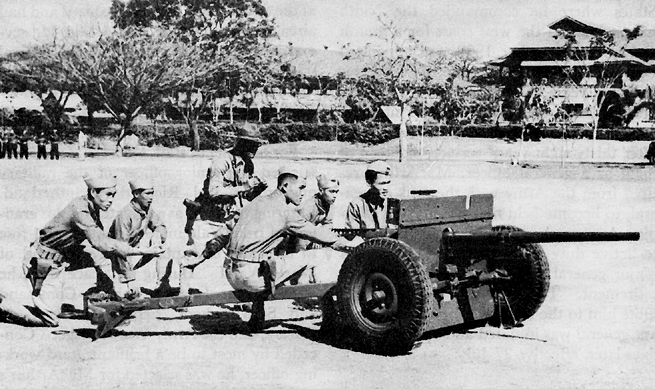
Philippine Scouts at Fort William McKinley firing a 37 mm gun in training. Note the lowered wheel segments.

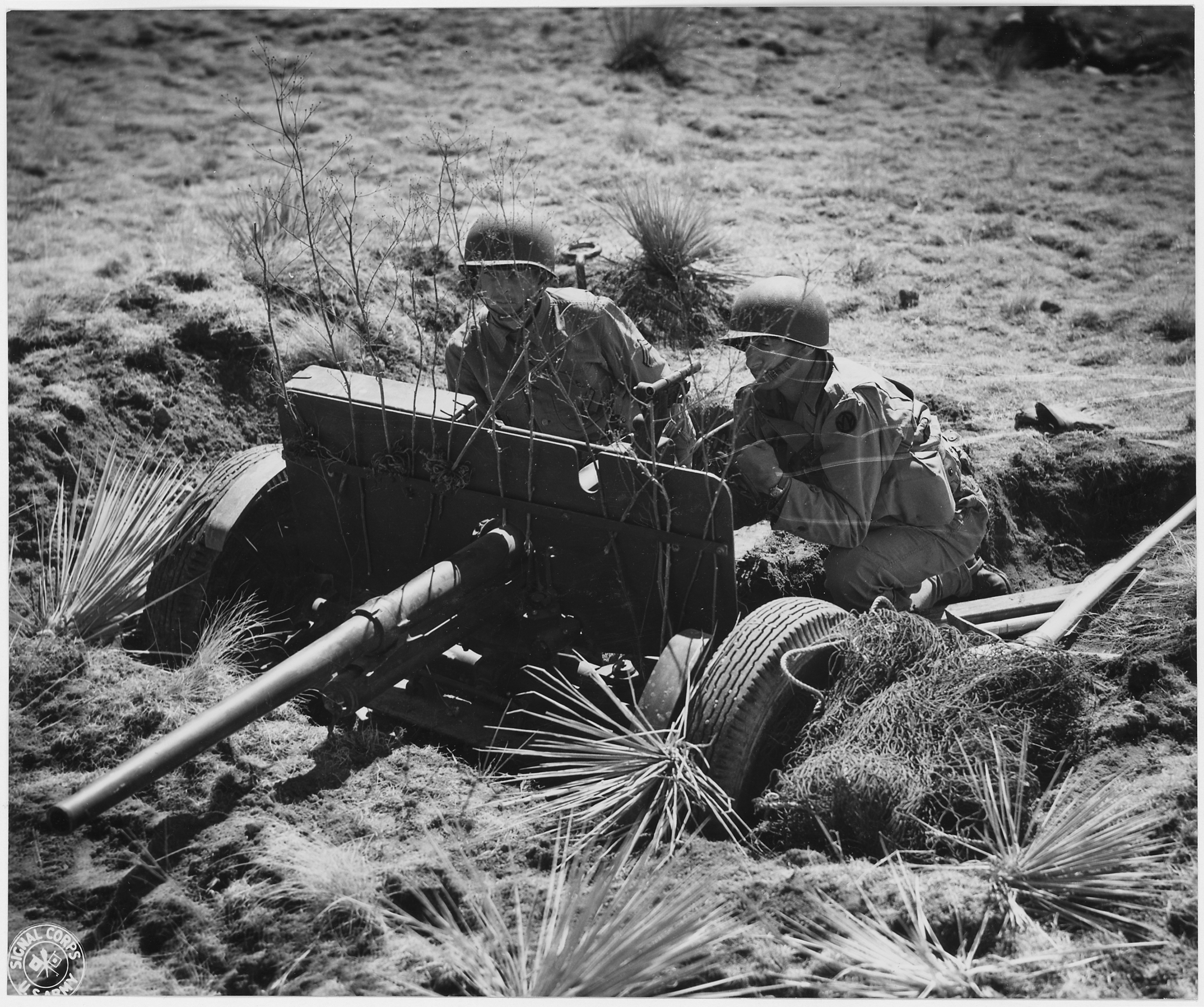
A dug in 37 mm gun at Camp Carson.

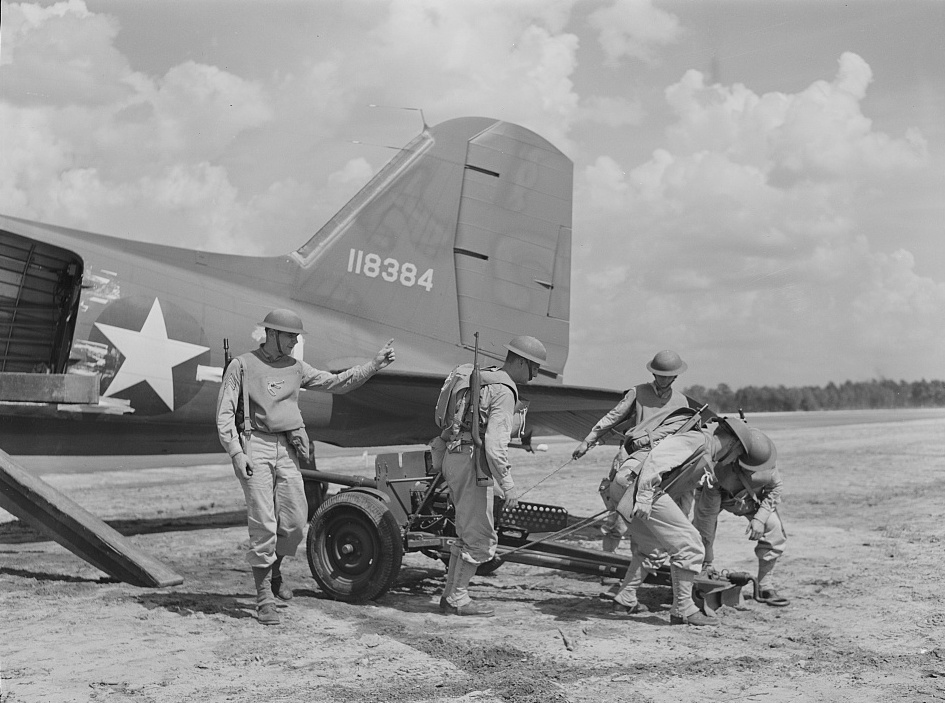
The M3 being unloaded from a transport plane during a military demonstration at Fort Bragg.

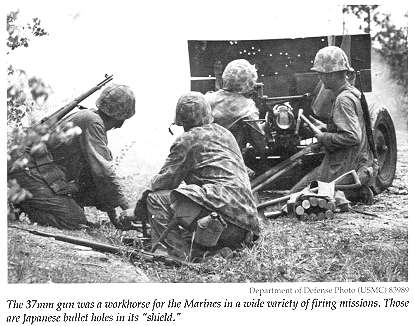
U.S. 37 mm gun crew in action, Saipan, 1944. From left to right are two ammunition carriers, gunner and assistant gunner. Note extended shield.

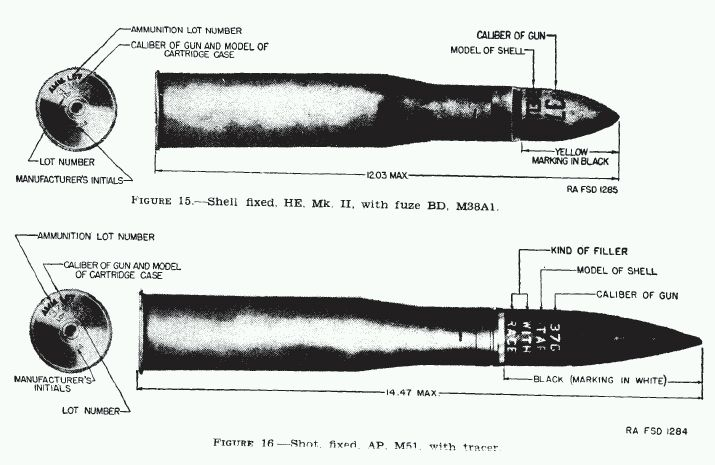
HE Mk II Shell and APC M51 Shot.

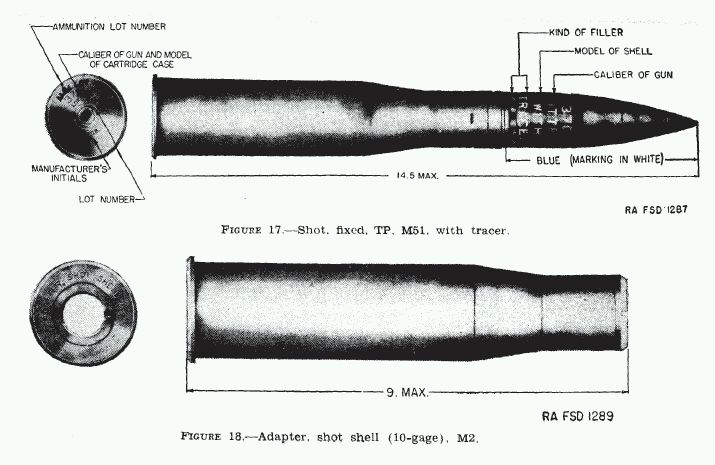
TP M51 Shot and 10-gauge adapter M2.

== Notes ==
Notes

Citations
