= M8 Greyhound =

M8 light armored car
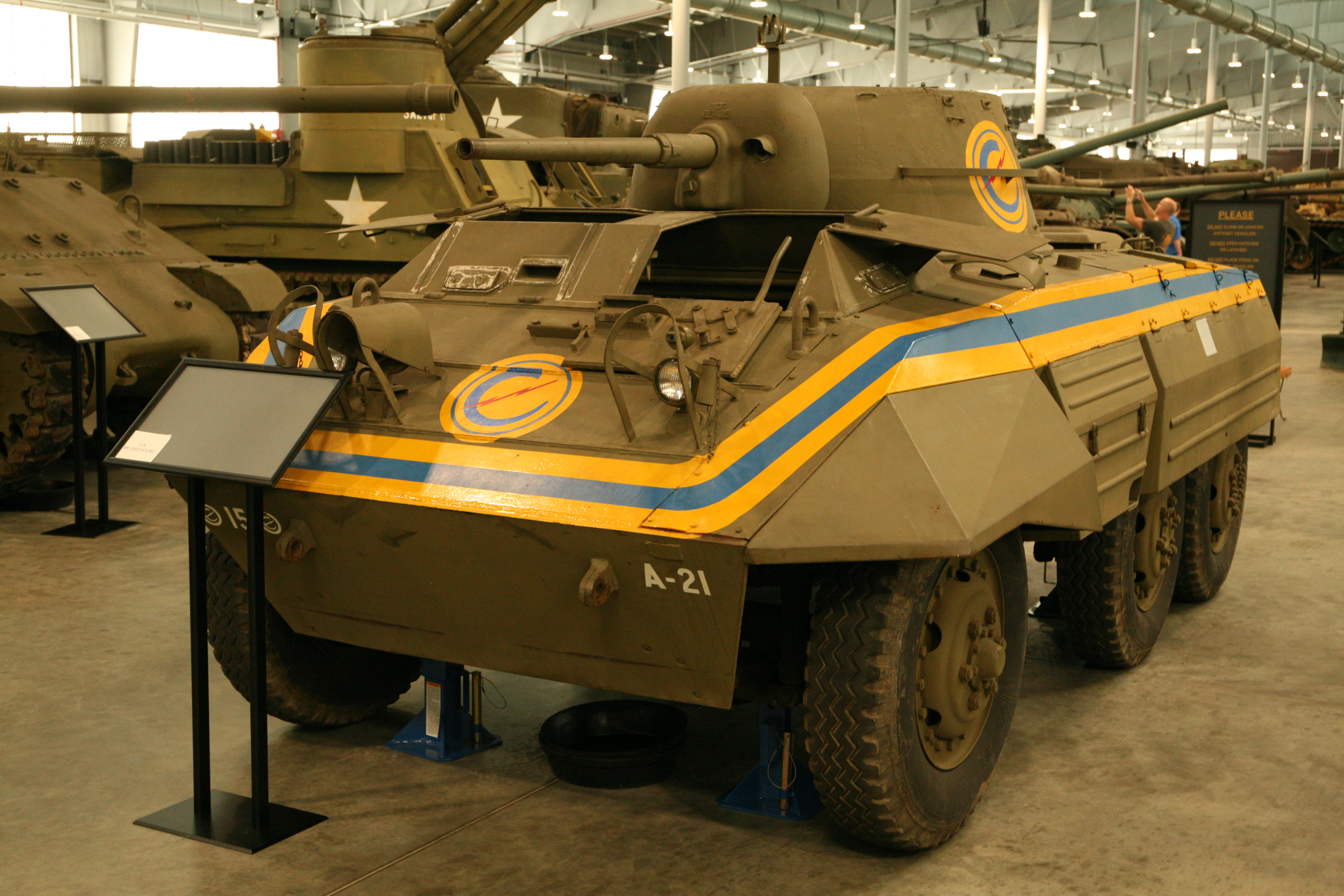
- M8 Greyhound at the U.S. Army Armor & Cavalry Collection, Fort Benning, Georgia, 2023
- Type: Armored car
- Place of origin: United States

Service history
- In service: 1943–present
- Used by: See List of operators
- Wars: World War II; Chinese Civil War; Korean War; April Revolution; Greek Civil War; First Indochina War; Cuban Revolution; Algerian War; Congo Crisis; Vietnam War; Cambodian Civil War; Laotian Civil War; Guatemalan Civil War; Colombian conflict Internal conflict in Peru; Iran–Iraq War

Production history
- Designer: Ford Motor Company
- Designed: 1942
- Manufacturer: Ford Motor Company
- Produced: March 1943 – June 1945
- No. built: 8,523 M8; 3,791 M20
- Variants: See Variants

Specifications
- Mass: 16,400 lb (7.4 t)
- Length: 15 ft 5 in (4.70 m)
- Width: 7 ft 7 in (2.31 m)
- Height: 6 ft 3 in (1.91 m)
- Crew: 4 (commander/loader, gunner, driver, assistant driver)
- Armor: Up to 1 in (25 mm)
- Main armament: 1× 37 mm gun M6; 80 rounds
- Secondary armament: 1× .30 caliber (7.62 mm) Browning M1919 machine gun 1,500 rounds 1× .50 caliber (12.7 mm) Browning M2HB machine gun 400 rounds
- Engine: Hercules JXD 6 cylinder 4-cycle inline gasoline engine 110 hp (82 kW) at 3,200 rpm
- Power/weight: 14.79 hp/metric ton
- Transmission: Synchromesh; 4 speeds forward, 1 reverse
- Suspension: Leaf spring
- Ground clearance: 11.4 in (0.29 m) under axles
- Fuel capacity: 54 US gal (200 L)
- Operational range: 100–250 mi (160–400 km) cross country 200–400 mi (320–640 km) on road
- Maximum speed: 55 mph (89 km/h) on road
- Steering system: Steering wheel

The M8 light armored car is a 6×6 armored car produced by the Ford Motor Company during World War II. It was used from 1943 by United States and British forces in Europe and the Pacific until the end of the war. The vehicle was widely exported and as of 2024 still remained in service with some countries.

In British service, the M8 was known as the "Greyhound," a service name seldom, if ever, used by the US. The British Army found it too lightly armored, particularly the hull floor, which anti-tank mines could easily penetrate (the crews' solution was lining the floor of the crew compartment with sandbags). Nevertheless, it was produced in large numbers. The M8 Greyhound's excellent road mobility made it a great supportive element in the advancing American and British armored columns. It has marginal cross country capabilities, especially in mud.

== Development and production history ==
In July 1941, the U.S. Army Ordnance Department initiated the development of a new fast tank destroyer to replace the M6 37 mm gun motor carriage, which was essentially a ¾-ton truck with a 37 mm gun installed in the rear bed. The requirement was for a 6×4 wheeled vehicle armed with a 37 mm gun, a coaxial machine gun mounted in a turret, and a machine gun in the front hull. Its glacis armor was supposed to withstand fire from a .50 in (12.7 mm) machine gun and side armor from a .30 in (7.62 mm) machine gun. Prototypes were submitted by Studebaker (designated T21), Ford (T22) and Chrysler (T23), all of them quite similar in design and appearance.

In April 1942, the T22 was selected, despite complaints about deficiencies, due to the need for vehicles. By then, it was clear that the 37 mm gun would not be effective against the front armor of German tanks; so, the new armored car, now designated the M8, took on a reconnaissance role instead. Contract issues and minor design improvements delayed serial production until March 1943. Production ended in June 1945. A total of 8,523 M8 armored cars, and 3,791 of its lighter M20 variant, were built. The M8s and M20s were manufactured at Ford Motor Company plants in Chicago, Illinois, and Saint Paul, Minnesota; the St Paul plant built 6,397 M8s to Chicago's 2,126; the 3,791 M20s were produced at the Chicago plant only.

In May 1942, having viewed the prototype, the British Tank Mission turned down the offer to acquire the M8 through lend-lease. It was named "Greyhound" in keeping with other U.S. armored cars already ordered by the British, such as the (cancelled) T18 Boarhound, the T17 Deerhound, the T17E1 Staghound and the (also cancelled) M38 Wolfhound. (Note: The M38 armored car was designed as a M8 replacement, prototypes built in 1944 and cancelled due to the end of the war)

Production of M8 and M20 armored cars
Month	M8	M20
March 1943	15	
April 1943	31	
May 1943	110	
June 1943	169	
July 1943	512	126
August 1943	314	205
September 1943	803	275
October 1943	545	293
November 1943	1,000	400
December 1943	800	325
January 1944	562	214
February 1944	468	193
March 1944	241	53
April 1944	223	48
May 1944	241	53
June 1944	234	32
July 1944	256	29
August 1944	243	83
September 1944	232	158
October 1944	234	160
November 1944	234	159
December 1944	215	155
January 1945	232	97
February 1945	144	153
March 1945	162	163
April 1945	150	150
May 1945	153	156
June 1945		111
Total	8,523	3,791

== Mission and operational performance ==
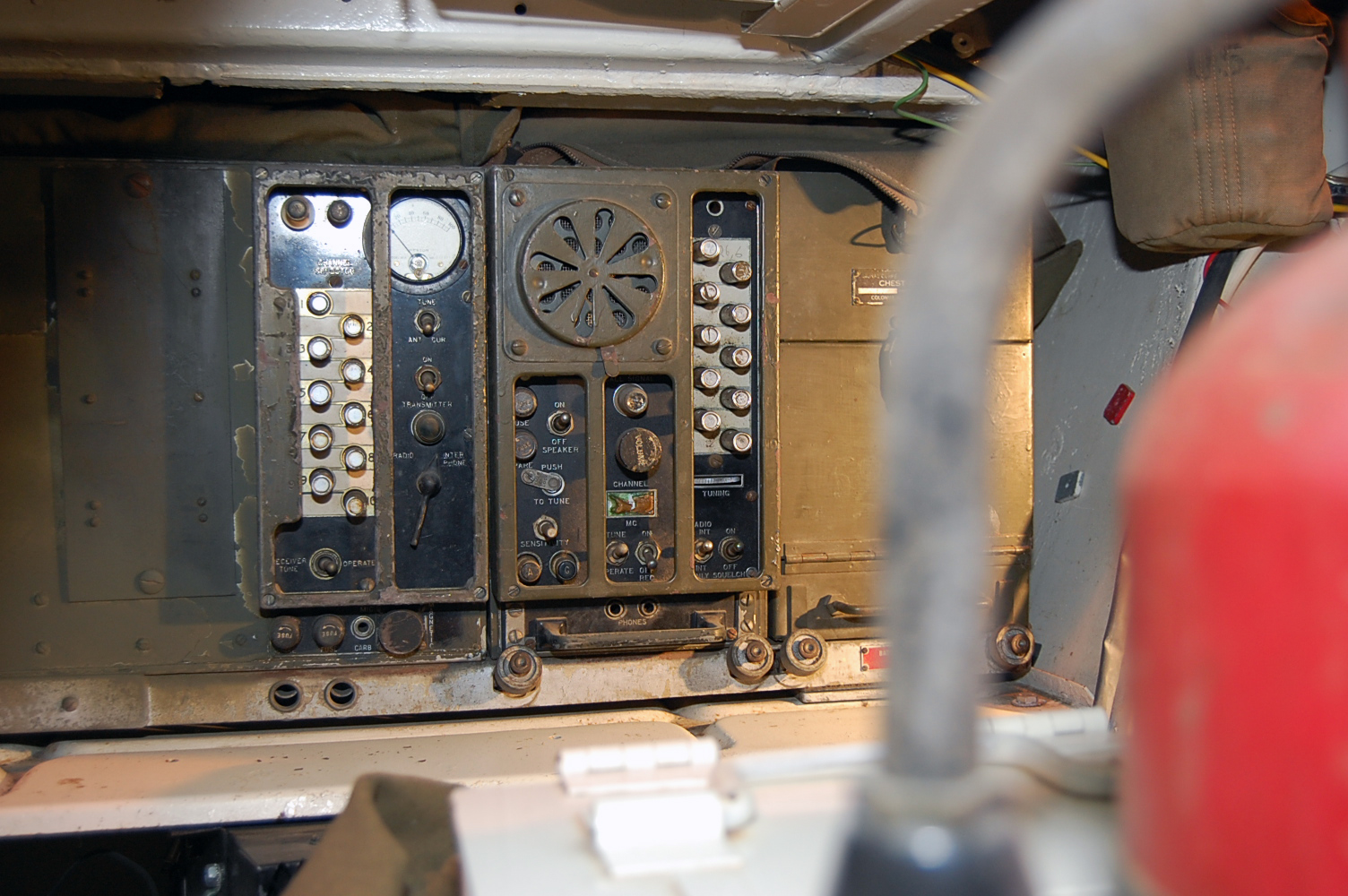
Radio inside an M8

The cavalry reconnaissance troops (equivalent to companies) assigned to infantry divisions and squadrons (equivalent to battalions) assigned to armored divisions or independent, and used at the direction of a division or corps commander, served as advance "eyes and ears," and this required speed and agility. When on the march, the cavalry was to make contact with enemy forces at the earliest practical moment and maintain it thereafter. The reconnaissance troops identified hostile units and reported their strength, composition, disposition and movement. During withdrawals, the cavalry often served as a screening force for the main units.

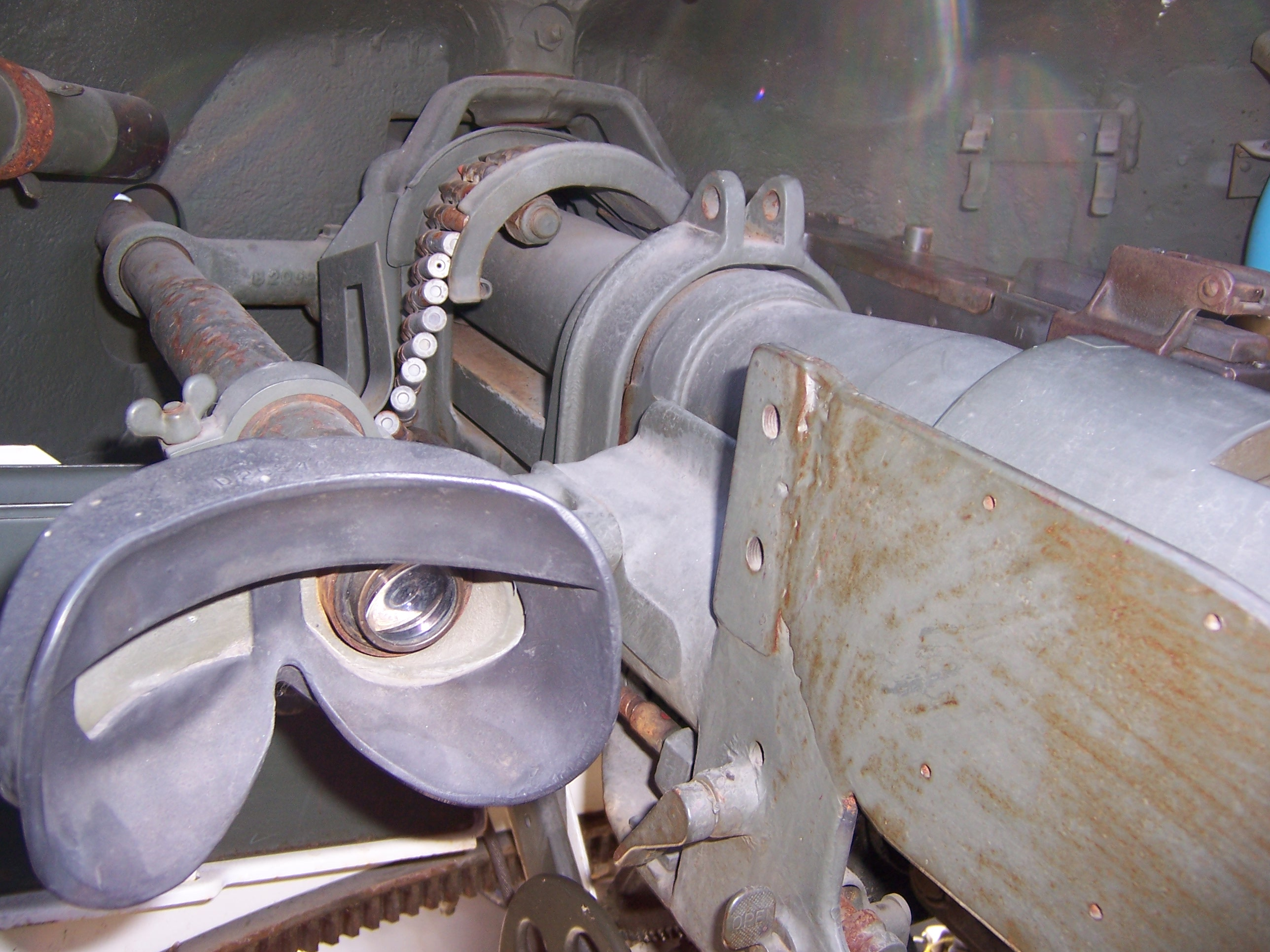
The telescopic sight used to aim the main 37 mm gun

The M8 was not designed for offensive combat, and its firepower was adequate only against similar lightly armored enemy vehicles and infantry. With only the unarmored hull pan to serve as floor armor, the M8 was particularly vulnerable to mines.

The vehicle's other drawback was limited mobility in muddy or broken terrain or heavily wooded areas. The use of wheels, rather than continuous tracks like a tank, gave it a higher ground pressure which hampered its off-road performance in such terrain. Armored cavalry units preferred using the ¼-ton reconnaissance car (Willys MB "jeep") in these environments. A large turning radius, limited wheel travel, and open differentials also limited its cross-country mobility and made the M8 susceptible to immobilization off-road in off-camber terrain and defiles. This led operators to using the vehicle mostly on existing roads and paths, where it became vulnerable to ambush. Conversely, the performance of the M8 on hard surfaces was exceptional, with the vehicle having a long range and able to consistently maintain its top speed of 55 mph. In addition, as a wheeled vehicle, the M8 was generally more reliable than tracked vehicles of similar size, requiring far less maintenance and logistical support.

== Description ==
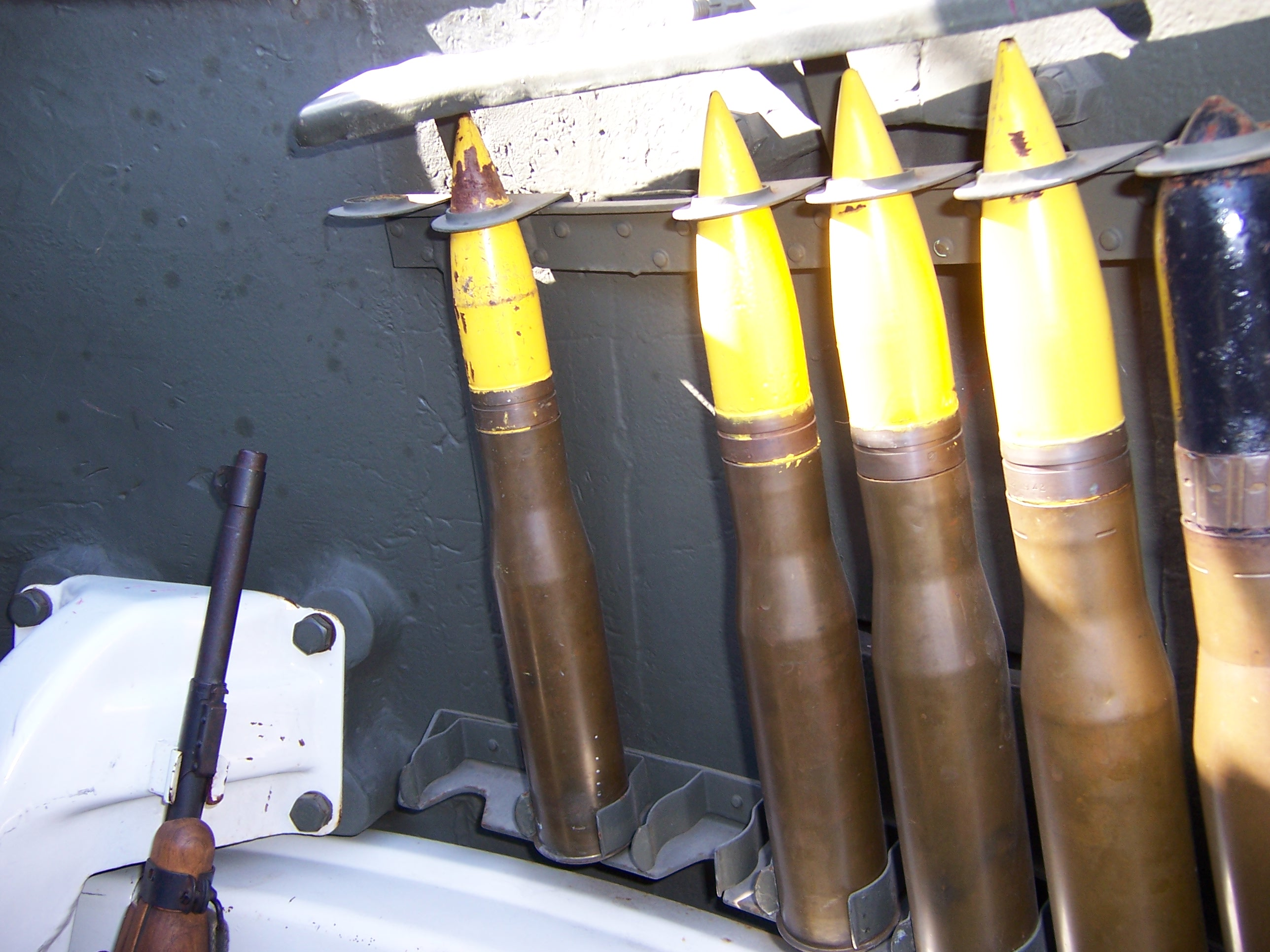
Shells for the main 37 mm gun were stored on racks inside the turret. The barrel of an M1 carbine, carried for close-in vehicular defense, is visible at left.

The M8's armor was thin, but it provided protection for the crew from small-arms fire and shrapnel, enough so that the vehicle could carry out its main mission of reconnaissance. The frontal, sloped hull armor varied in thickness from 0.5 to 0.75 inches (13 to 19 millimetres) The side and rear hull armor, also sloped but slightly less so than the front, was 0.375 inches (9.5 mm) thick. The top armor was 0.25 inches (6.4 mm) thick, as was the floor. The turret was comparatively better protected than the hull, being 0.75 inches (19 mm) thick all around, with an 0.25-inch (6.4 mm) partial roof. The cast, rounded gun shield was uniformly 1 inch (25 mm) thick.

The M8 was fitted with a 37 mm M6 gun (aimed by an M70D telescopic sight) and a coaxially mounted .30 in (7.62 mm) Browning machine gun in a one-piece, cast mantlet, mounted in an open-topped, welded turret. The M8 was initially fitted without any kind of anti-aircraft defense; as a stopgap solution a .50 caliber Browning M2HB machine gun on a ring mount was retrofitted to nearly all vehicles already in service. A purpose-designed pintle was mounted on all late-production vehicles, but it saw comparatively little action due to a troubled development process.

The crew of four comprised a commander (who doubled as the loader), gunner, driver, and radio operator (who could also act as a driver). The driver and radio operator were seated in the forward section of the hull, while the commander and gunner sat in the turret, with the commander seated on the right, and the gunner on the left,

The vehicle carried 80 37 mm rounds (16 in the turret and 64 in an ammunition rack in the right sponson) when fitted with a single radio. Vehicles with a second radio installed only carried 16 main gun rounds. Some units solved this problem by cutting up the removed main ammunition rack and stowing 18 rounds in each sponson, under the radios. This raised the number of main gun rounds able to be carried to 52. Another modification (the most common one) involved fabricating (again from the discarded main ammunition rack) a 43-round bin to be placed behind the driver's seat, and a 20-round bin attached to the framing of the turret basket. This raised the ammunition capacity up to 79 rounds. Machine gun ammunition consisted of 1,500 .30 caliber rounds and 400 .50 caliber rounds. In addition, the vehicle carried a mix of six Mk 2 fragmentation grenades, 6 MK 3 offensive grenades, four smoke grenades, and four M1 carbines for the crew, and six M1 anti-tank mines.

The M8 was powered by a Hercules Model JXD in-line six-cylinder 320 cubic-inch gasoline engine giving it a top speed of 55 mph (89 km/h) on-road, and 32 mph (51 km/h) off-road. With a 54 US gal (200 L) fuel tank, it could manage a road range of 200–400 miles (320–640 km) The Hercules JXD ran more quietly than other engines of comparable power, which helped the M8 maintain an element of surprise and reduce the chance of being heard by the enemy. Because of this, the M8 armored cars in Patton's Third Army were known as "Patton's ghosts", since they were difficult to detect.

Each M8 armored car was equipped with a long-range radio set to communicate with higher headquarters. A short-range radio set was used to communicate within the unit, or with headquarters. The M8 weighed 16,400 lb (7,400 kg) fully loaded with equipment and crew, and was capable of 100–250 mi (160–400 km) cross country or 200–400 mi (320–640 km) on highways without refueling. On normal roads, it was capable of a sustained speed of 55 mph (89 km/h). Early production models were fitted with the SCR-193 transmitter and SCR-312 Receiver due to lack of SCR-508 radio sets.

== Service history ==
=== World War II ===
The M8 light armored car entered combat service with the Allies in the 1943 invasion of Sicily. It was purpose designed to serve as the primary basic command and communication combat vehicle of the U.S. Cavalry Reconnaissance troops. It was subsequently used by the US Army in Italy, Northwest Europe and the Pacific. In the latter theater, it was used mostly on Okinawa and the Philippines, and was even employed in its original tank destroyer role, as most Japanese tanks had armor that was vulnerable to its 37 mm gun. Over 1,000 were supplied via Lend-Lease to US allies; the United Kingdom, Free France and Brazil.

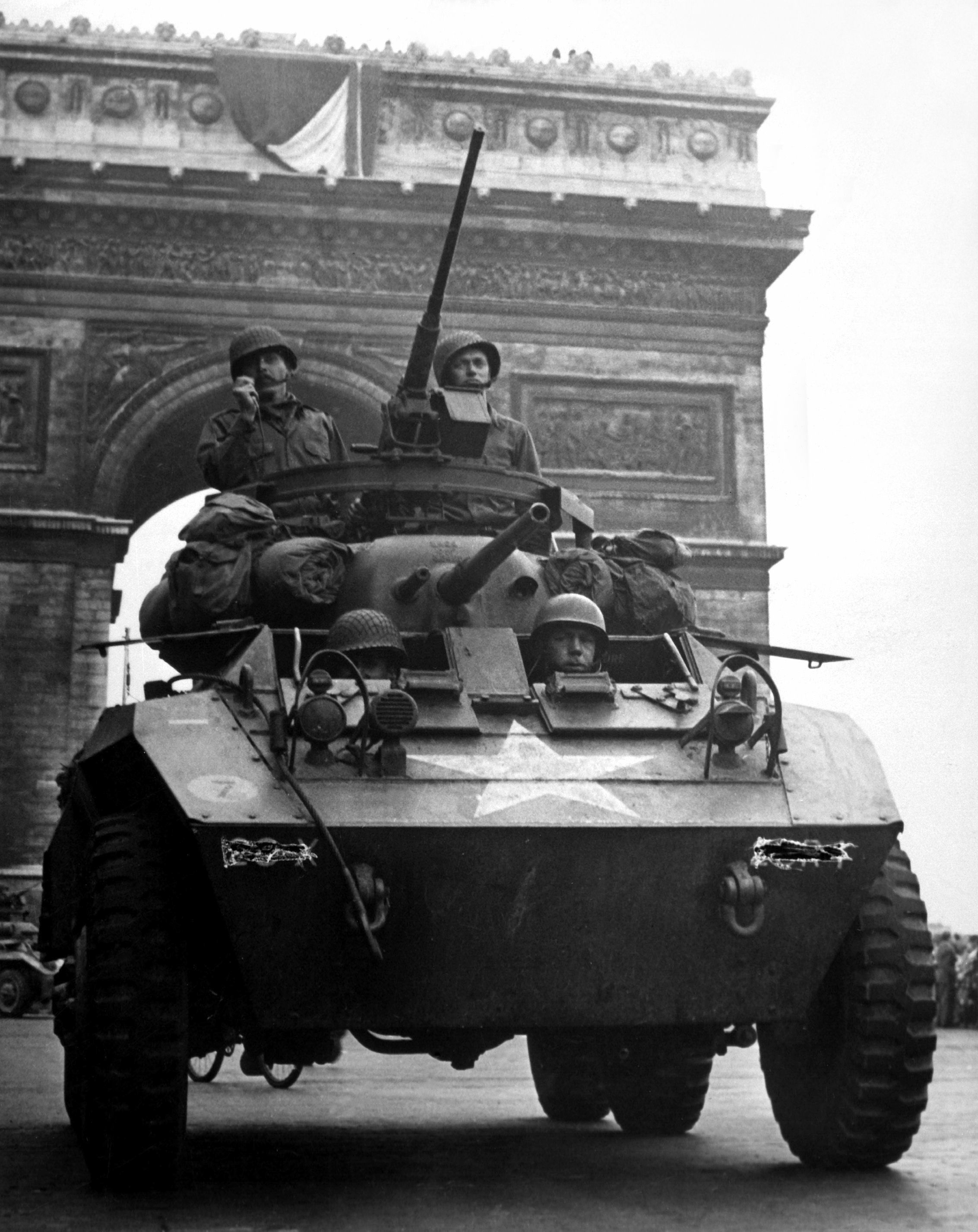
American troops in an M8 passing the Arc de Triomphe after the liberation of Paris

In the European Theater, the M8 received "varied acceptance." Its on-road performance was generally good, and it was armed and armored well enough for reconnaissance missions. On the other hand, the turning radius was considered too wide, and the engine was considered underpowered, routinely experiencing problems such as overheating from being run at high output continuously and/or having its ventilation louvers obstructed by personal equipment stored on the rear of the vehicle. Large numbers were regularly under repair, gaining the vehicle a reputation of being unreliable. Off-road mobility, especially on soft ground like mud or snow, was poor; in the mountainous terrain of Italy and in the Northwest European winter, the M8 was more or less restricted to roads, which greatly reduced its value as a reconnaissance vehicle. It was also very vulnerable to landmines. In February 1944, an add-on armor kit was designed to provide an extra quarter-inch of belly armor to reduce landmine vulnerability. Some crews also placed sandbags on the floor to make up for the thin belly armor. Another problem was that commanders often used their reconnaissance squadrons for fire support missions, for which the thinly-armored M8 was ill-suited. When it encountered German armored reconnaissance units, the M8 could easily penetrate their armor with its 37 mm gun. Conversely, its own thin armor was vulnerable to the 20 mm autocannons that German scout cars were equipped with.

Due to mobility problems with the M8, namely with regards to its suspension, the US Army's Special Armored Vehicle Board recommended the development of a new six-wheeled armored car which matched the M8's dimensions and size but was equipped with an articulated, independently sprung suspension system. Two prototypes, the Studebaker-developed T27 Armored Car and the T28 designed by Chevrolet were trialed by the US and also reviewed by the British Armed Forces. Although the T28 was standardized as the M28 and marked for production by Ford, the new armored car program was shelved and then permanently cancelled due to the end of the war, as impetus and funding for new military development projects had plummeted. The fleet of M8 and M20 armored cars already available was then considered more than adequate for the postwar US Army, which was demobilizing thousands of personnel and already had large stockpiles of equipment surplus to its requirements.

=== Post-war ===
M8 Greyhound at the Museum of Military History, Vienna

After the war, many of the US Army's M8 and M20 armored cars were marked off as surplus and donated or sold to various countries, especially under the Foreign Military Assistance Program (MAP). Most of the remaining vehicles remained in service with the United States Constabulary in various Western European nations. M8s were also used by American occupation forces in Korea, which later donated them to the fledgling Republic of Korea Army's first armored cavalry regiment.

Most M8s and M20s remaining in US service had been allocated to one of five reorganized armored cavalry regiments by the early 1950s. The others were utilized by the Military Police Corps, which deployed them during the Korean War for guarding static installations and escorting prisoners. A small number of M20s were modified by US or South Korean forces as assault vehicles equipped with ring-mounted flamethrowers during that conflict. All the US Army M8s and M20s were retired from active duty due to age and increasing obsolescence shortly after the Korean War. The majority of decommissioned vehicles were then shipped abroad as aid to various armies, especially the French Far East Expeditionary Corps, save for a small number which were retained by Army National Guard units. When the Army National Guard retired its own armored cars a few years later, an undisclosed number were purchased by domestic police departments and modified for riot control purposes.

France was the largest postwar operator of the M8/M20 series after the United States, having received hundreds of the vehicles as American aid between 1945 and 1954. During the First Indochina War, many second-hand examples were shipped directly from the US to French Indochina, where they were deployed for rural patrols and road reconnaissance. These remained in service in Indochina until the end of the war, when they were donated to the Army of the Republic of Vietnam (ARVN). The French Foreign Legion also utilized the M8 during the Algerian War, where it was superseded first by the Panhard EBR and subsequently by the Panhard AML in counter-insurgency operations. The EBR was accepted as a generic replacement for all remaining M8s by the French military in 1956. Between 1956 and 1964 the remaining M8s and M20s were donated to the Mobile Gendarmerie, as well as the armies of several former French colonies.

ARVN M8s and M20s saw considerable action during the Vietnam War; however, by 1962 the US noted the attrition rate of the fleet was becoming high due to age. This resulted in a proposal to fund the design and production of a new purpose-built armored car for the South Vietnamese government: the Cadillac Gage Commando. The Commando series began to replace the M8 and M20 in ARVN service from the mid-1960s onward. A small number of the older armored cars were still held by the ARVN reserves as late as 1975; these were inherited by the People's Army of Vietnam after the war.

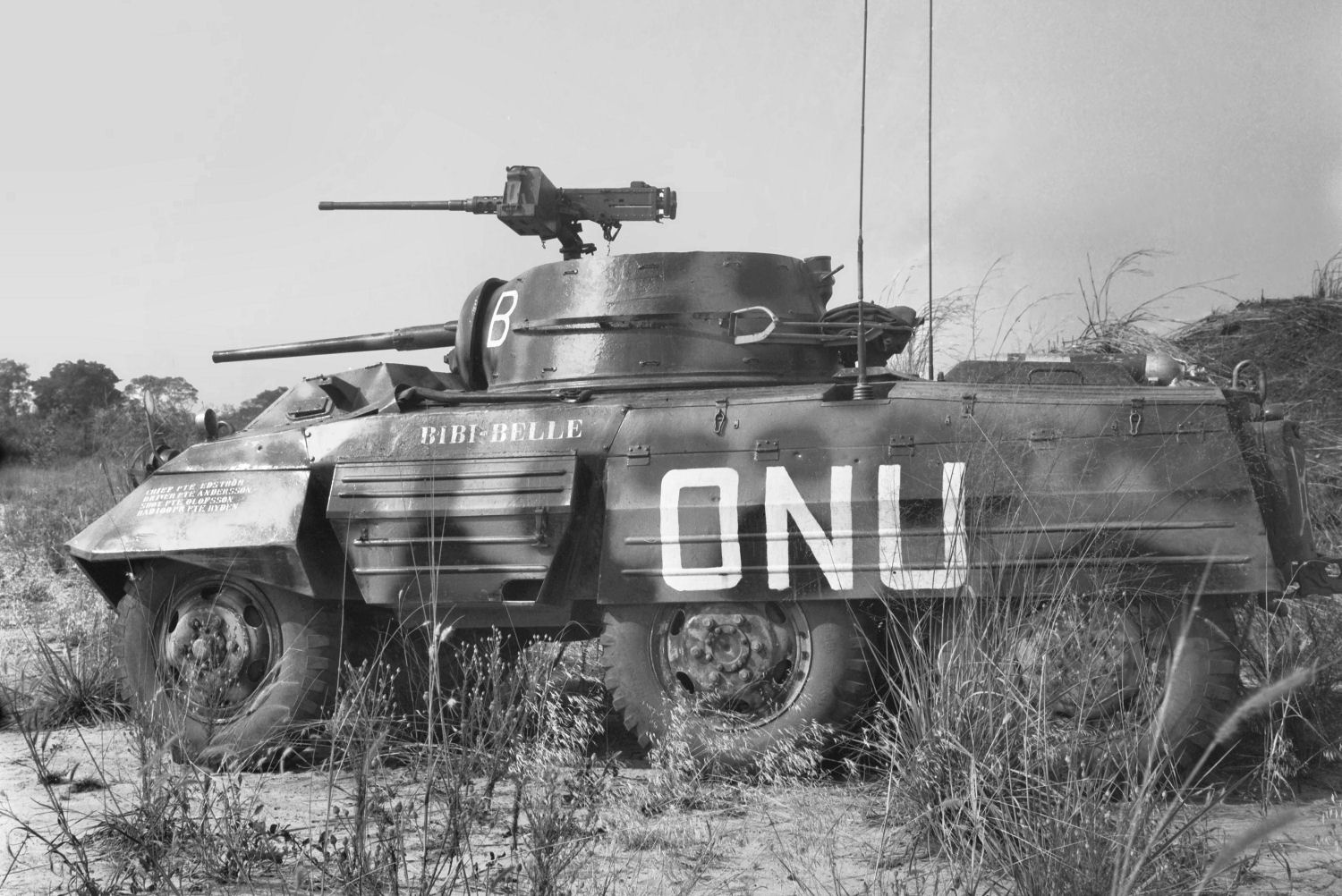
A captured Katangese M8 Greyhound that was used by Swedish ONUC forces, 1963

Another country which received a substantial number of ex-American M8s following the war was Belgium, which presumably received them as part of a NATO military assistance program. These M8s were adopted primarily by the Belgian Air Component, which issued them to base security units, and the Force Publique in the Belgian Congo. Following Congolese independence several of the Force Publique M8s fell into the hands of Katangese separatists, while others were repurposed for peacekeeping operations by the United Nations Operation in the Congo (ONUC). The continued proliferation of M8s and M20s during the late 1960s and the 1970s resulted in American and French defense contractors offering several commercial upgrade kits to extend their service life. At least ten countries, Cameroon, Cyprus, Ethiopia, El Salvador, Guatemala, Haiti, Jamaica, Morocco, Venezuela, and Zaire, modernized their M8/M20 fleets with diesel engines and new transmissions during this time. The National Army of Colombia also invested heavily in upgrading the M8's turret armament, having it replaced by a single .50 caliber machine gun and a launcher for BGM-71 TOW anti-tank missiles. In the late 1960s Brazil developed an upgraded M8 with an articulated suspension, new gearbox, and a new engine built with parts that could be sourced locally. This project spawned a series of indigenous prototypes, including a bizarre four-wheeled variant of the M8 chassis known as the VBB, and another more conventional six-wheeled design known as the VBR-2. The latter subsequently evolved into the first Brazilian-manufactured armored car, the EE-9 Cascavel.

The Madagascar Armed Forces still had M8s in service as of 2024.

== List of operators ==
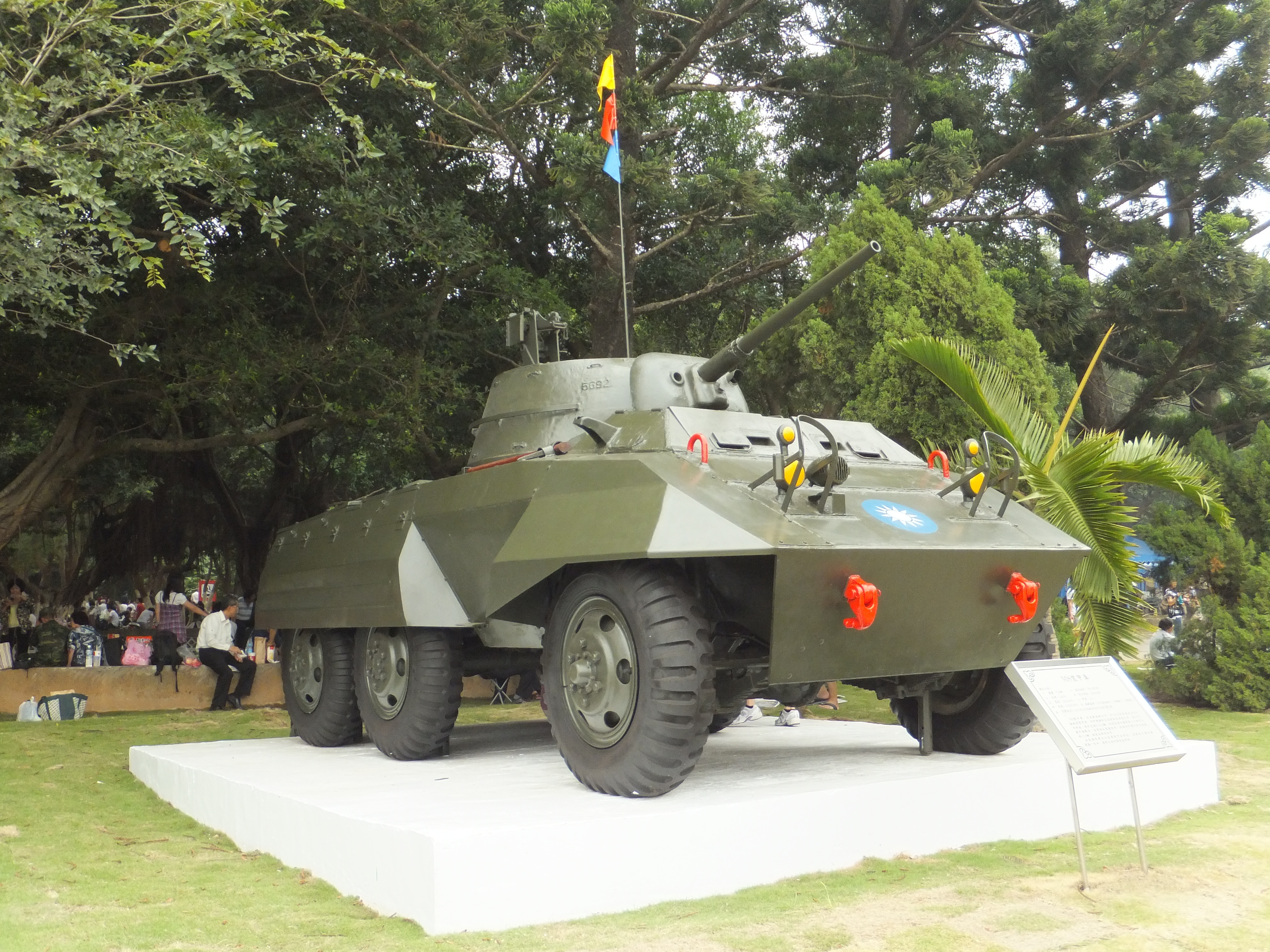
Plinthed M8 in Taiwan, with Republic of China Army (ROCA) markings

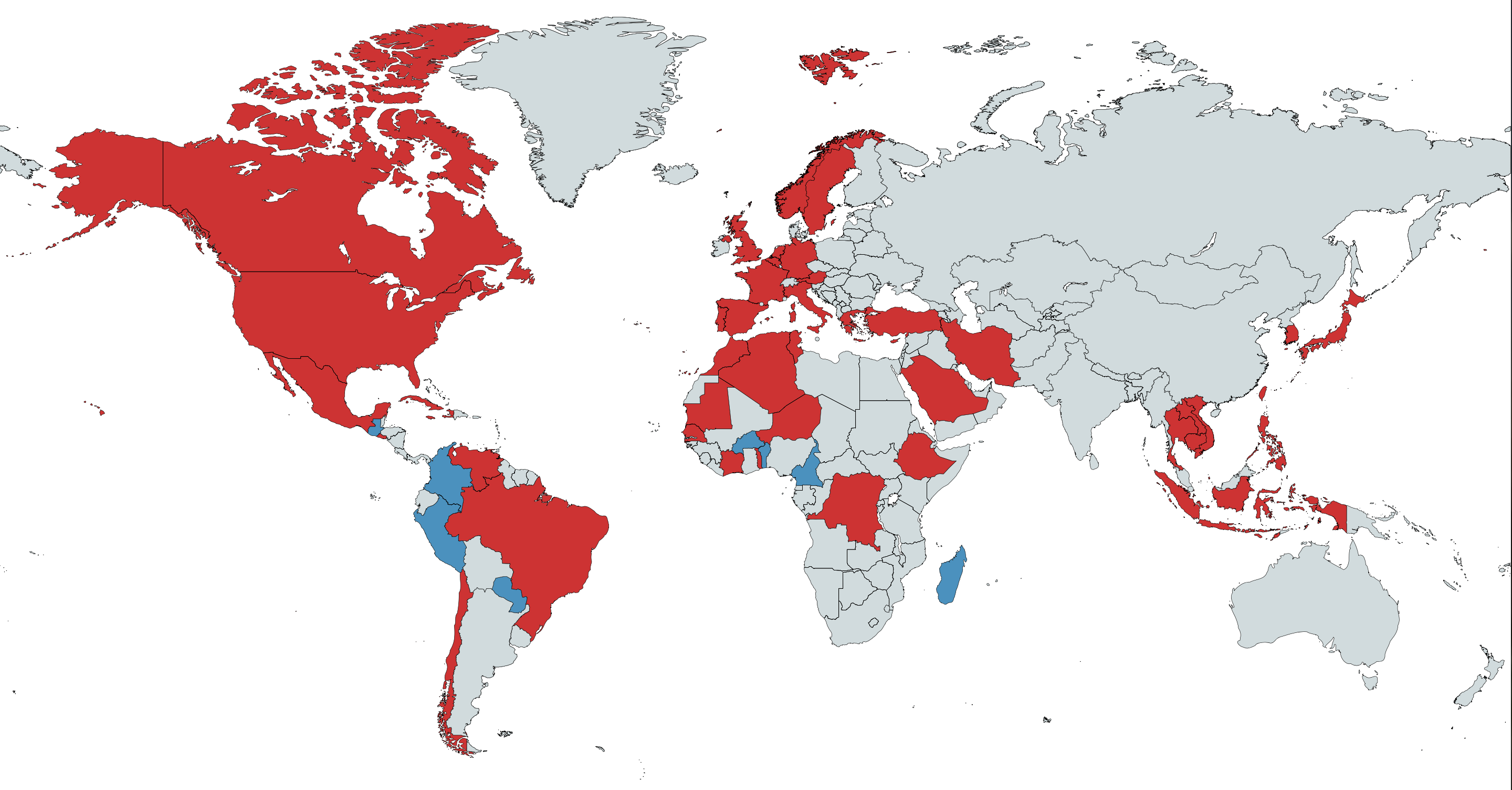
Map with operators of the M8 in blue and former operators in red

=== Current operators ===
- Benin:7
- Burkina Faso: 10; donated by France.
- Cameroon: 8
- Colombia: 95 used for anti aircraft
- Guatemala: Some by the US after World War II
- Madagascar: 8; donated by France
- Paraguay: 12
- Peru: 30

=== Former operators ===
- Algeria: Some donated by France
- Austria: 25
- Belgium: Utilized primarily by the Belgian Air Component for base security, as well as the Force Publique
- Brazil: 20
- Cambodia: 5
- Canada
- Chile
- China: Lend leased by the US during World War II
- Democratic Republic of the Congo
- Cuba: 20
- Cyprus: Some donated by Greece and later modernized by an American firm
- El Salvador
- Ethiopia: 15; modernized in the 1960s with diesel engines
- France: 894; 689 M8s and 205 M20s
- Germany: Captured during World War II. Some used as dedicated air defense vehicles.
- West Germany: Donated by US and used by the Bundesgrenzschutz
- Greece: 207
- Haiti
- Indonesia used by the Indonesian Police
- Iran: 100
- Italy: Some donated by the US after World War II
- Ivory Coast: 15; donated by France
- Japan
- Jamaica
- Katanga
- Laos: 15; donated by France
- Mauritania: 15
- Mexico: 50
- Morocco: 55; some purchased from both France and the US
- Netherlands: Later used by Indonesia
- Niger: 8; donated by France
- Norway
- Philippines
- Portugal: Some donated by the US as part of a NATO assistance program
- Saudi Arabia
- Senegal: 10; donated by France
- South Korea: 200
- South Vietnam: Estimates range from 200 in service
- Spain: most notably used in the Sahara, by the Legion
- Sweden: 4 captured from the enemy during UN peacekeeping missions in the Congo 1960–1964, used by Swedish Army elements
- Taiwan: Inherited from World War Two US lend lease, small numbers used by Taiwan Provincial Police Department.
- Thailand: 50
- Togo: 6
- Tunisia: 10
- Turkey
- United Kingdom: 496
- ONUC
- United States: 8,523
  - Prince George's County Police Department
- Venezuela: 15
- Vietnam: Presumably inherited from the defunct ARVN
- Yugoslavia: 150 to 265, received during the Informbiro

== Variants ==
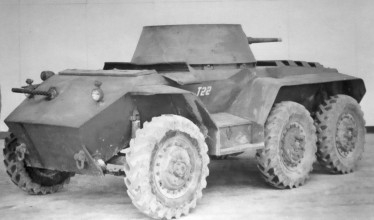
The T22 prototype

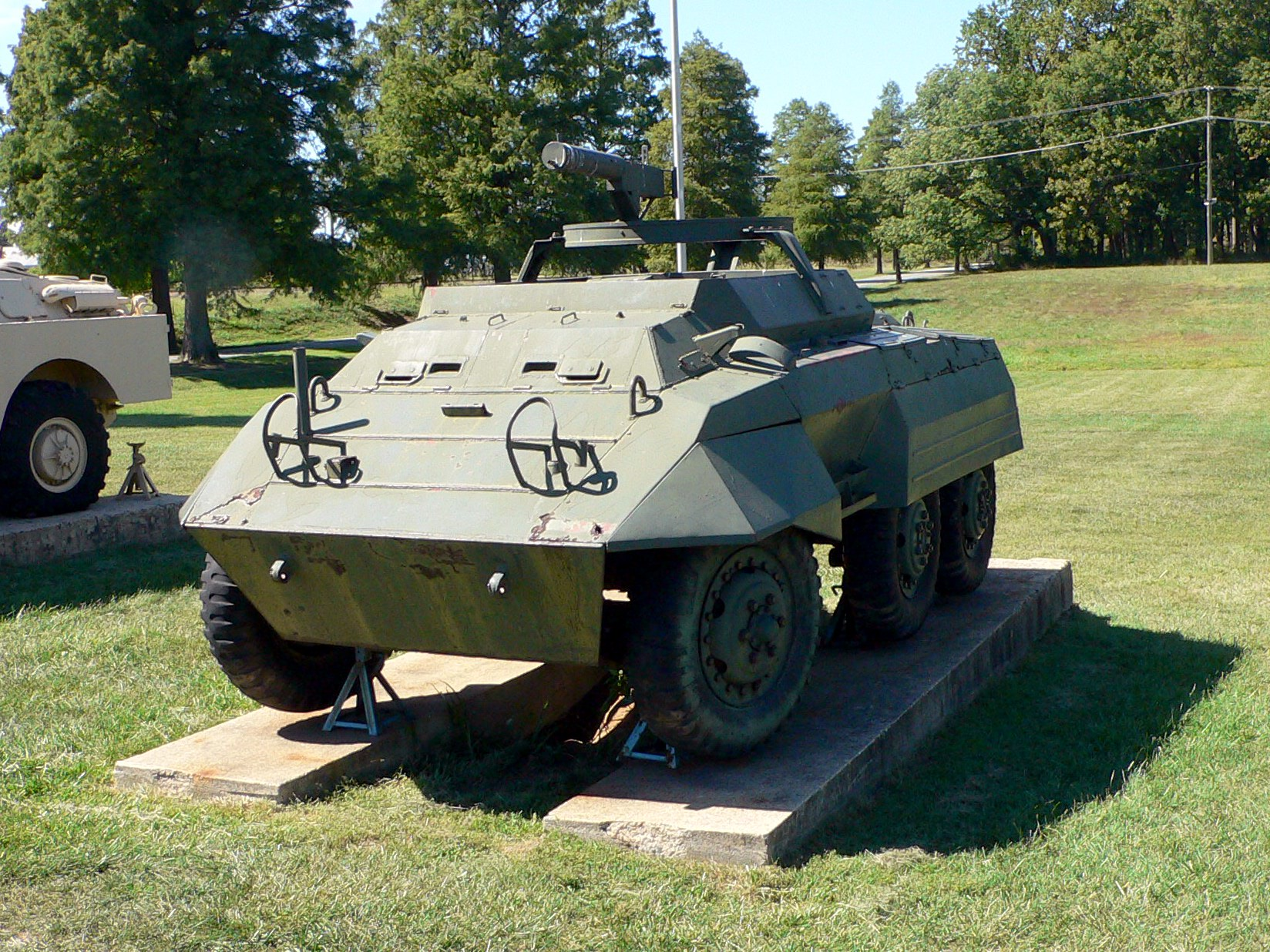
M20 Armored utility car at the US Army Ordnance Museum

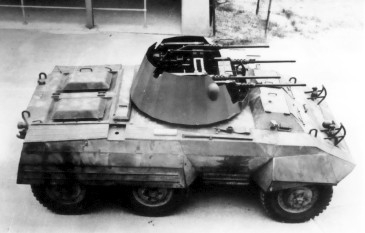
T69 Multiple Gun Motor Carriage

T22 light armored car
first prototype
T22E1 light armored car
a 4×4 prototype
T22E2 light armored car
prototype eventually standardized as M8
M8 light armored car
production variant
M8E1
light armored car: a variant with modified suspension. Two vehicles were produced in 1943.
M20 armored utility car
also known as the M20 scout car, was a Greyhound with the turret replaced with a low, armored open-topped superstructure and an anti-aircraft ring mount for a .50 cal M2 heavy machine gun. A bazooka was provided for the crew to compensate for its lack of anti-tank weaponry. The M20 was primarily used as a command vehicle and for forward reconnaissance, but many vehicles also served as armored personnel carriers and cargo carriers. It offered high speed and excellent mobility, along with a degree of protection against small arms fire and shrapnel. When employed in the command and control role, the M20 was fitted with additional radio equipment. Originally designated the M10 armored utility car, it was redesignated M20 to avoid confusion with the 3-inch Gun Motor Carriage M10. A total of 3,680 M20s were built by Ford during its two years in production (1943–1944).
T69 multiple gun motor carriage
in late 1943, an anti-aircraft variant of the M8 was tested. The vehicle was armed with four .50-inch machine guns in a turret developed by Maxson Corporation. The anti-aircraft board felt that the vehicle was inferior to the similarly armed M16 MGMC half-track and the project was closed.
M8 TOW tank destroyer
M8 upgraded by the US company Napco. The main gun was replaced by a .50-inch machine gun and a BGM-71 TOW launcher was installed above the turret. Upgraded vehicles were used by Colombia.
M8/M20 H-90
a French upgrade for the M20 showcased by GIAT Industries in 1971, which mounted a 90 mm low-velocity gun adopted from the Panhard AML family of reconnaissance vehicles.
CRR Brasileiro
a version developed in 1968 by the Brazilian Army Engineering Institute (IME). The middle axle was removed and a new engine (120 hp (89 kW) Mercedes-Benz OM-321) installed to create the VBB-1 of which one prototype was completed, the vehicle being found to be inferior. The Vbb-1 was, in turn, the basis for the CRR which reverted to a 6×6 configuration and eight vehicles were produced for evaluation. The EE-9 Cascavel was developed from the CRR.
M8 (diesel)
Hellenic Army armored car: a number of M8 armored cars were upgraded with a Steyr diesel engines in place of the Hercules JXD gasoline engines, this required a rearwards extension of the engine compartments by 11.8 in (300 mm), as well as some heightening. Also fitted were new radios, indicators and new hooded lights, rear view mirrors, while the M2HB anti-aircraft machineguns were moved to the right front of the turrets, where new pintle sockets were bolted on the partial roofs (the turret rear sockets being retained) and the coaxial 0.30-inch M1919A4s replaced by 7.62×51mm NATO MG3 machineguns. Used for coastal defense and retired from service in the late 1990s.
Colombian AM8
a Colombian fusion of turret-mounted World War II anti-air artillery in an M8 with a modern motor. It is a counter-insurgency weapon for use against guerrilla ambushes in the Colombian mountains.

== See also ==
- List of U.S. military vehicles by model number
- List of U.S. military vehicles by supply catalog designation

== Notes ==
Notes

Citations
