= T17E1 Staghound =

T17E1 Staghound armored car
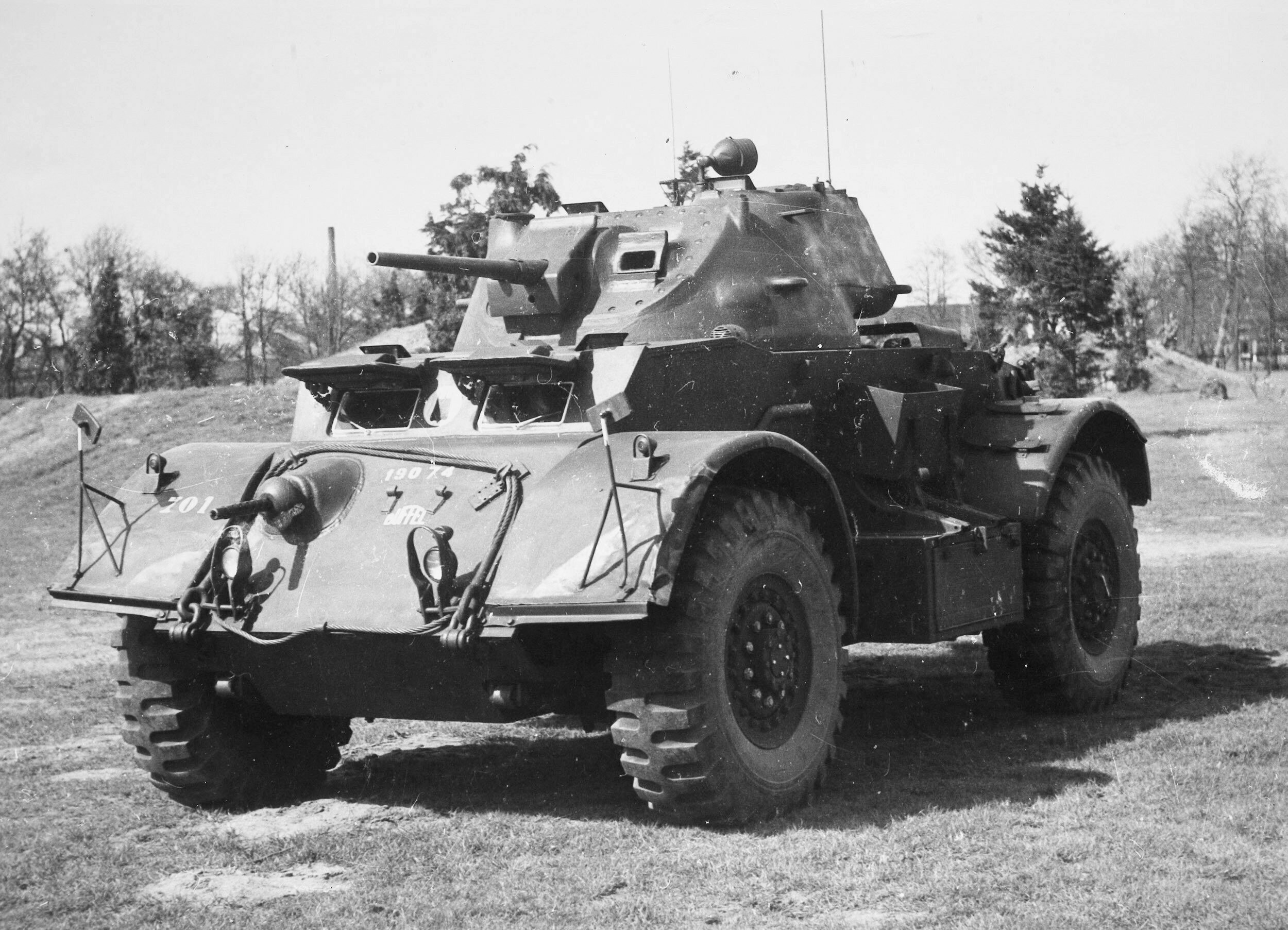
- Type: Armored car
- Place of origin: United States

Service history
- In service: 1944–1980s
- Used by: See Operators
- Wars: World War II; Greek Civil War; 1948 Arab-Israeli war 1958 Lebanon crisis Cuban Revolution; Lebanese Civil War; Rhodesian Bush War; Nicaraguan Revolution; Vietnam War

Production history
- Designer: Chevrolet
- Produced: October 1942 – April 1944
- No. built: 3,844

Specifications (Staghound Mark I)
- Mass: 14 t
- Length: 17 ft 10 in (5.49 m)
- Width: 8 ft 10 in (2.69 m)
- Height: 9 ft 4 in (2.84 m)
- Crew: 5
- Armor: 9 to 44 mm
- Main armament: 1 × 37 mm M6
- Secondary armament: 2–3 × .30 (7.62 mm) M1919 Browning machine guns
- Engine: 2 × GMC 270; 2 × 97 hp (72 kW)
- Power/weight: 13.9 hp/tonne
- Suspension: wheels, 4 x 4
- Operational range: 450 miles (724 km)
- Maximum speed: 55 mph (89 km/h)

The T17E1 armored car was an American armored car manufactured during the Second World War. It saw service with British and other Commonwealth forces during the war under the name Staghound, but was never used on the front line by US forces. A number of other countries used the Staghound after the war; some vehicles continued to serve until the 1980s.

== History ==
In July 1941, the U.S. Army Ordnance issued specifications for a medium armored car alongside a specification for heavy armored car (which resulted in the T18 Boarhound). Ford Motor Company built a six wheels, all driven (6 x 6) prototype which was designated T17 and Chevrolet a four wheels, all driven (4 x 4) model designated T17E1. At the same time, the British Purchasing Commission was also looking for medium and heavy armored cars for use in the war in North Africa. Had the U.S. adopted this, it would have been called the M6.

Both the T17 and T17E used the same turret which was designed by Rock Island Arsenal with British requirements driving some of the design features such as putting at least two crew in the turret and placing the radio in the turret so that it was close to the commander.

== T17E1 ==
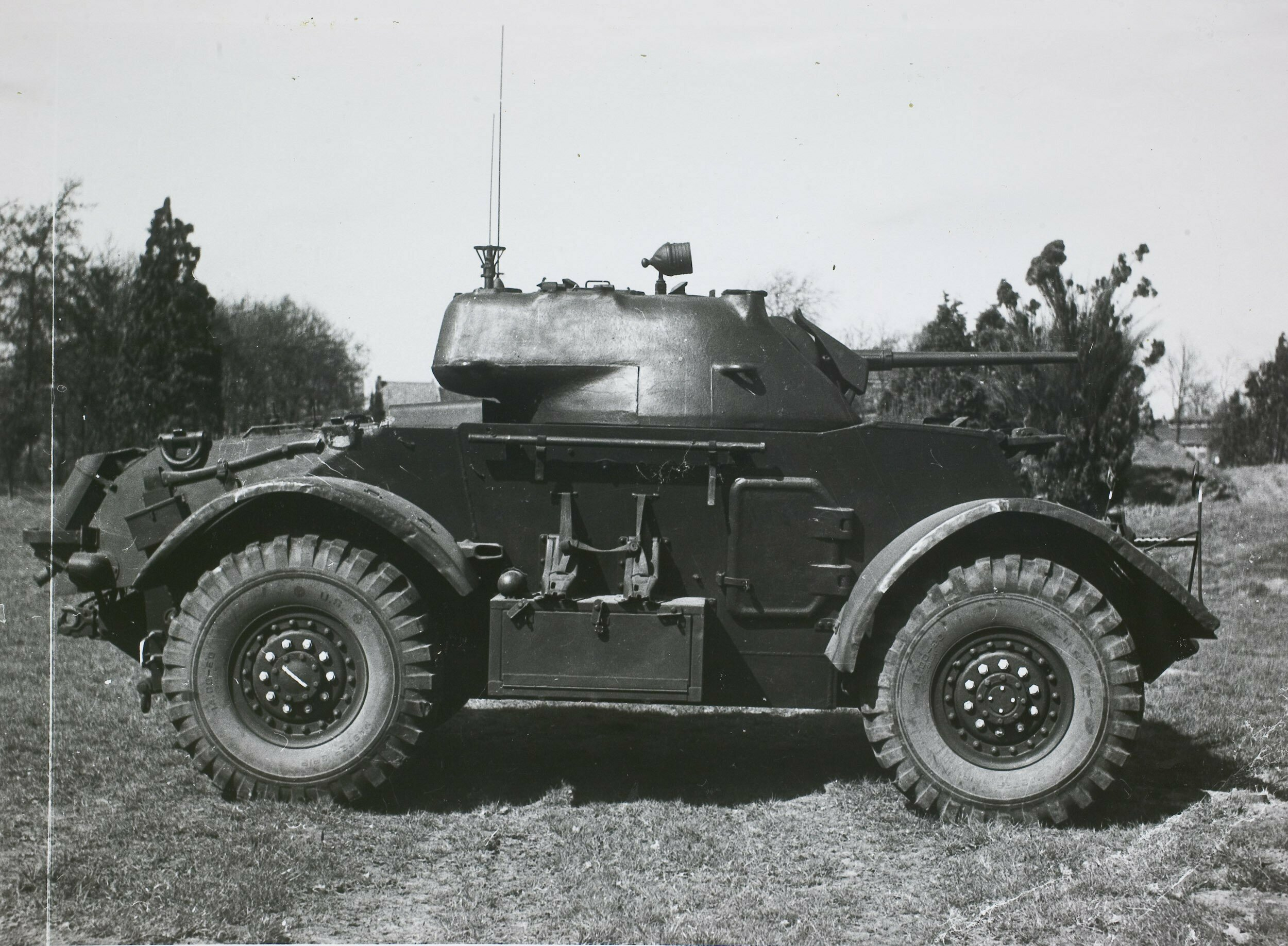
T17E1, profile

The British allocated the name Staghound to the T17E series. British liaison officers had had contact with Macpherson, the Chevrolet engineer in charge of the project and felt they had influenced him sufficiently to produce something that met all their requirements. Accordingly, in December the British Purchasing Commission "formally requested" production of 300 vehicles; the US Army authorized production of 2,000 in January 1942. The British order was confirmed in March 1942 when the pilot T17E was delivered to the Aberdeen Proving Ground. Testing showed flaws but these were expected to be correctable and a further 1,500 were contracted for.

Production started in October 1942. The US Army convened a board to examine the state of the multitude of armored car projects and recommended in December 1942 the cancellation of the larger designs and standardization on a smaller vehicle. This lighter vehicle would appear as the M8 Greyhound vehicle. However the British applied for T17E1 production to be continued for the United Kingdom under Lend-Lease. 3,844 Staghounds were produced in total.

The Staghound was an innovative design that incorporated some advanced features. It had two rear-facing 6-cylinder engines with automatic transmissions (with 4 forward and 1 reverse gears) feeding through a transfer case to drive both axles. Either two- or four-wheel drive could be selected. Either engine could be shut down while in motion and taken out of the drive train. Additionally, a power steering pump was incorporated that could be switched on or off manually from the driver's instrument panel depending on steering conditions. Steering and suspension components were directly attached to the hull as the structure was rigid enough to dispense with the need for a separate chassis.

== Operational service ==
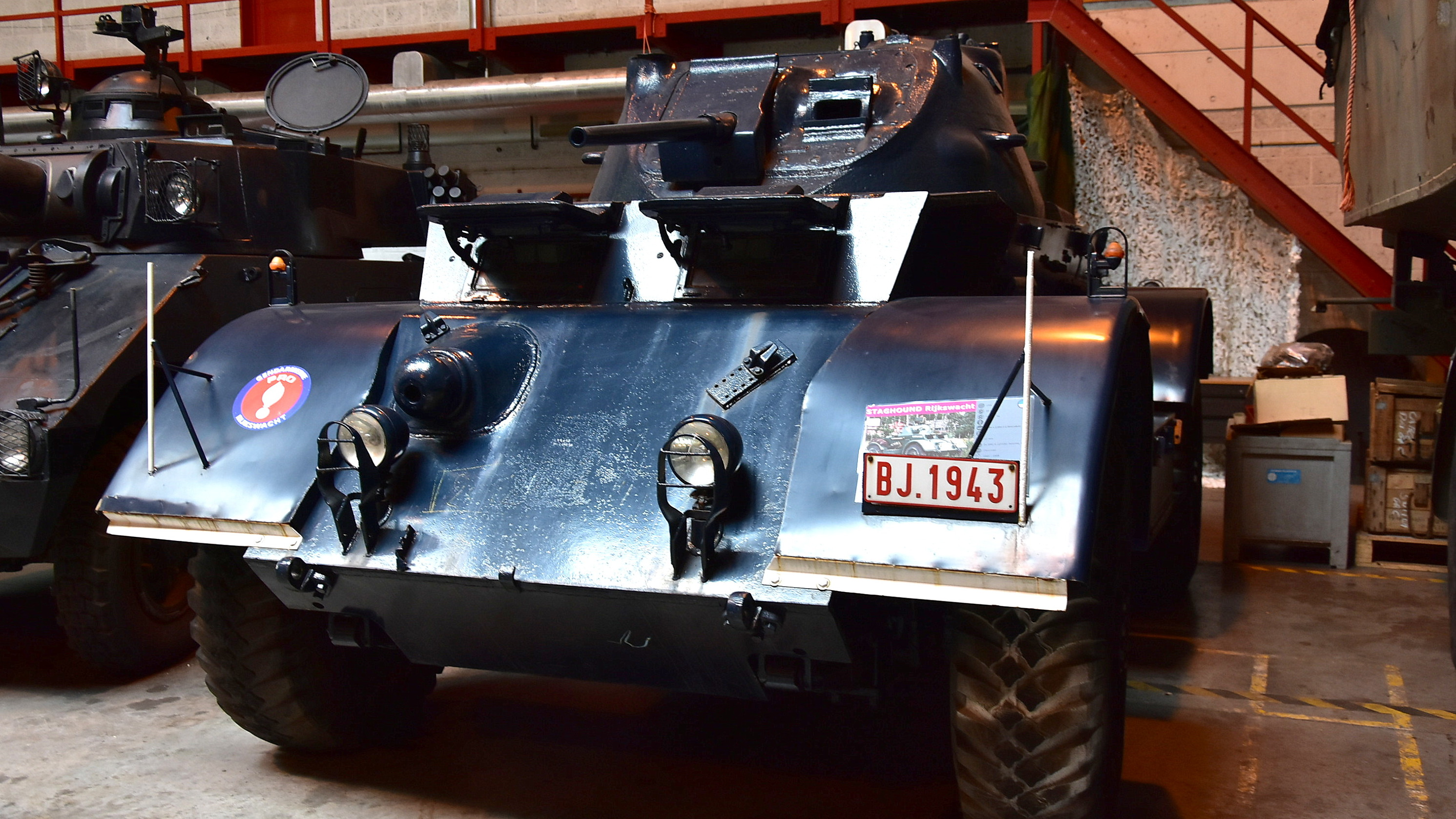
T17E1 of the Belgian Rijkswacht

The Staghound entered service too late for use in the North African Campaign where its combination of armor, range and main armament would have been an advantage in a light forces reconnaissance role. As a result, it first saw operational service in Italy, where many units found its large physical size too restrictive in the narrow roads and streets of Europe. It saw most service at squadron and regimental headquarter level; an armored car regiment having three Staghounds with the Regimental HQ and three with each HQ of the four squadrons in the regiment. Conditions for the Staghound improved when the Italian campaign became more mobile in the middle of 1944, and the Staghound was also used in north-west Europe campaign.

After the war, the Staghounds were distributed among smaller NATO countries in Europe and to the Middle East. For instance, Mk I and Mk III Staghounds were used during the Lebanese Civil War by both Christian and Muslim militias. The last new Staghound variant to be offered for export was probably a Swiss model retrofitted with several modern armament packages, including 30mm and 47mm anti-tank guns. It was marketed unsuccessfully to Syria.

== Operators ==
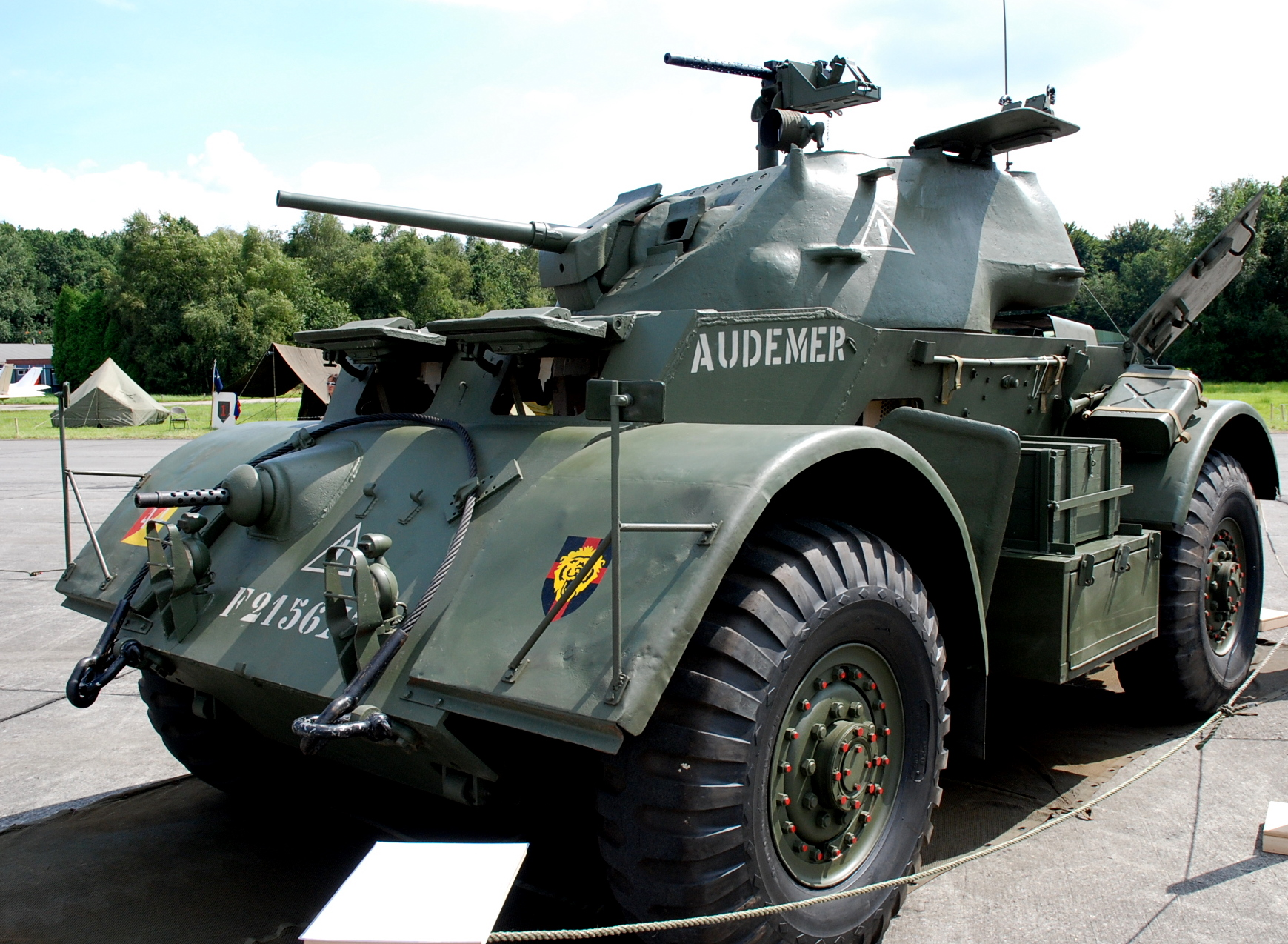
Staghound of the Free Belgian "Brigade Piron" unit

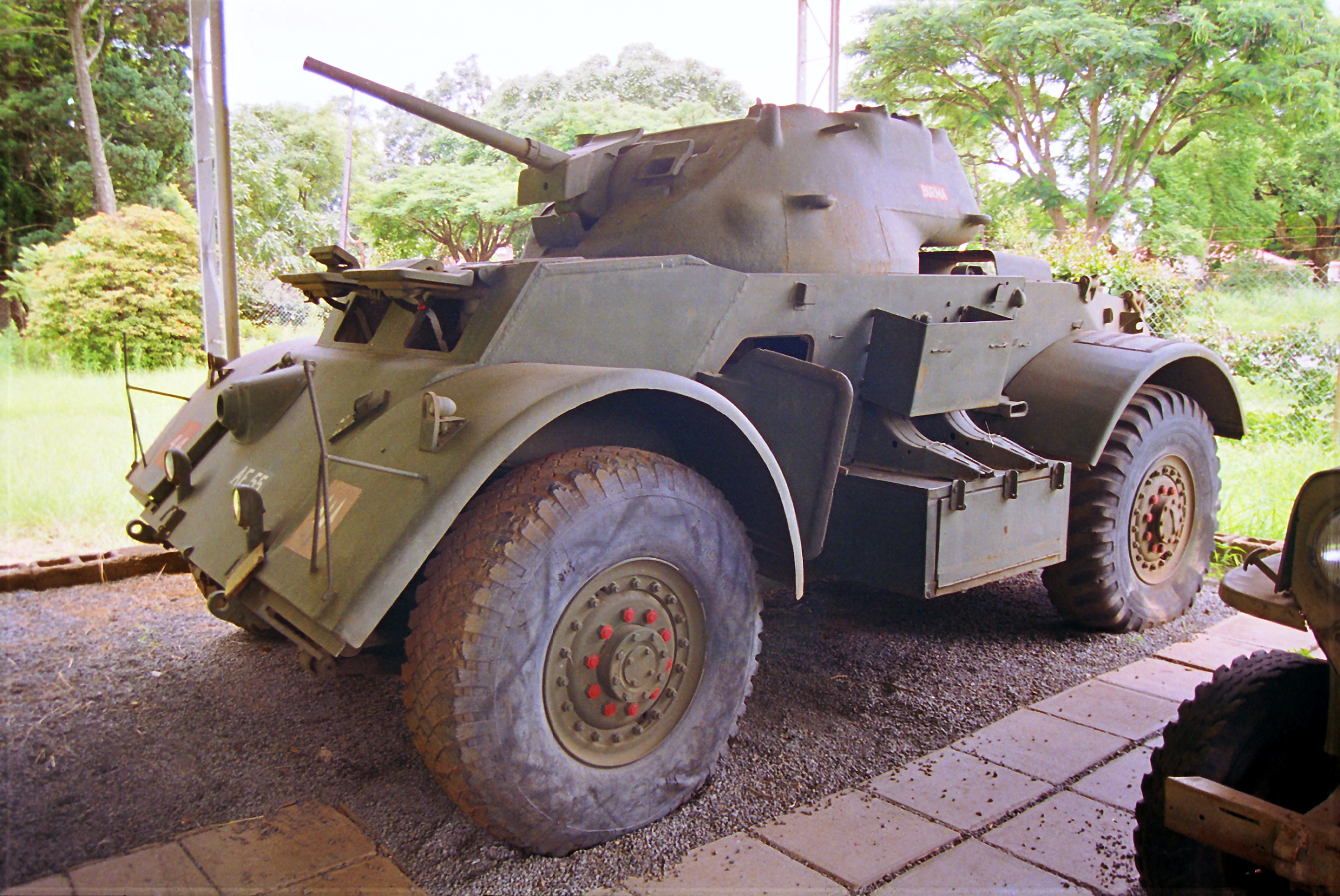
Staghound of the Rhodesian Armoured Corps

- Australia – 279 delivered from late 1943, remaining in service until 1970.
- Belgium
- Brazil
- Canada
- Cuba – 28 ex-Israeli T-17E1s were purchased from Nicaragua due to US arms embargo on Cuba in 1956.
- Denmark – 14 vehicles from 1946 to 1953
- Egypt – 50 in service with the Egyptian Army.
- (Kingdom of Greece) Greece – small number of vehicles left over post WW-II after British forces left the country.
- Honduras
- Hyderabad
- India
- Israel – 112 in service with the Israel Defense Forces.
- Italy – In service after WWII with Carabinieri, Italian Army and Polizia di Stato until 1970.
- Jordan
- Lebanon – 56 in service with the Lebanese Army and Internal Security Forces (ISF) between 1949 and 1983. Some of these had the US M6 37 mm gun and 0.30-inch M1919 machine guns replaced by a British Ordnance QF 2 pounder and 7.92 mm Besa machine guns. Others had the turret replaced with that of a 75 mm gun-armed AEC armoured car. Passed on in 1976 to the Army of Free Lebanon, Lebanese Arab Army, Tigers Militia, Kataeb Regulatory Forces, Lebanese Forces, Al-Mourabitoun, Arab Socialist Union, People's Liberation Army.
- Netherlands
- New Zealand
- Nicaragua – 40 model T-17E1 were purchased from Israel after the Suez war. 20 were later resold to Cuba in 1957. 18 in service with the Nicaraguan National Guard from 1957 to 1979.
- Poland
- Southern Rhodesia – Twenty in service with the Rhodesian Army between 1949 and 1976.
- Saudi Arabia
- (Somalia) Somali Republic
- South Africa – 450 T-17E1
- Sudan
- Switzerland
- Syria – 52 in service with the Syrian Army.
- Thailand
- South Vietnam – Used by the Army of the Republic of Vietnam during the Vietnam War
- (Provisional Revolutionary Government of the Republic of South Vietnam) – Used by the Republic of South Vietnam during the Vietnam War
- United Kingdom – British Army and Royal Navy

== Variants ==
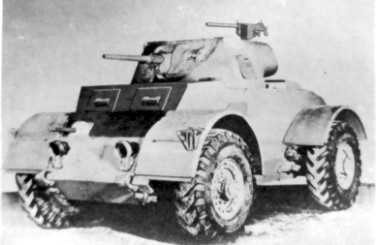
The original T17E1 prototype

T17E1 Staghound at Bastogne barracks.

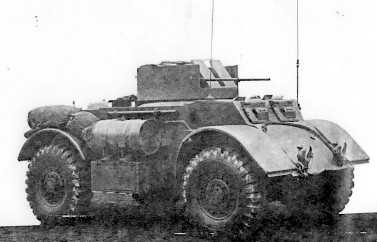
T17E2 Staghound AA

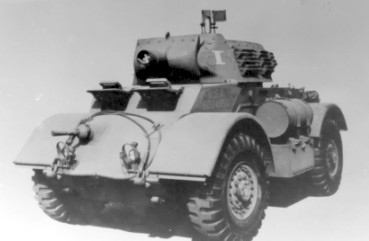
T17E3

- T17E1: 4x4 version built by Chevrolet for Britain. 2,844 units were produced.

Staghound Mk I

The T17E1 was armed with a 37 mm M6 gun, a coaxial .30 cal (7.62 mm) M1919A4 Browning machine gun and a 2-inch smoke mortar in a rotating turret. In the hull was mounted a second .30 cal M1919A4 Browning. Some T17E1 had an additional .30 cal M1919 machine gun for anti-aircraft defense.
The turret had power traverse and featured a turret basket (which limited the amount of internal crew storage). The 37 mm gun was gyroscopically stabilized.
This variant had a crew of five: commander, loader, gunner, driver, and hull machine gunner.
It saw combat with the British, Free Polish, Canadian, New Zealand, Indian, and Belgian armies in Italy, Greece and Northwest Europe. After the war, it saw further action in Greece, Cuba, Nicaragua, Lebanon and Rhodesia.

Staghound Mk II

This was a field conversion that had a 3 inch howitzer Mk 1 for close support mounted in place of the 37 mm gun in the turret. The bow machine gun was removed. It is not known how many were converted. These were issued to the Armoured Car HQ section.

Staghound Mk III

Had a turret taken from an 6-pdr (57 mm) gun armed Crusader tank and 7.92 mm Besa machine gun. Some of these were then re-fitted with the AEC armoured car Mk III turret with 75 mm gun. There was no bow machine gun. These had reached the front line by 1945, where it was supplied to heavy troops of armoured car regiments. The total number ordered was around 100–300. Post war this version saw usage with Denmark and combat in Lebanon.

Staghound command

The turret was removed and extra wireless equipment was installed.

- T17E2 (Staghound AA)

The T17E2 was an T17E1 fitted with a Frazer-Nash-designed turret mounting two 0.5 inch (12.7 mm) M2 Browning heavy machine guns. The turrets were built in the US for British Motor Torpedo Boats. Redesign of the turret and mounting was carried out. 2,610 rounds were carried. The turret was open-topped and had an electric-hydraulic traverse system with a maximum slew rate of 55 degrees a second. It had a reduced crew of three: commander/gunner, loader and driver.
1,000 units were produced between October 1943 and April 1944, when production stopped.

- T17E3

T17E1 fitted with the turret of 75 mm howitzer motor carriage M8, carrying the 75mm M2/M3 howitzer. This was trialled in December 1943, but never reached production.

- Radpanzer Staghound

Swiss variant of the Staghound Mk I. The 37 mm gun was replaced with a Swiss 47 mm Pak 41 gun.

- Radpanzer Staghound mit Versuchswaffen ("with trial gun")

A Swiss prototype for testing AA weaponry, fitted with 20mm, 30mm, and 34mmm Hispano-Suiza cannons.

== See also ==
- List of the United States military vehicles by supply catalog designation
