= T23 armored car =

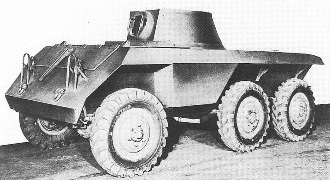
- Mock-up of the proposed T23 car
- Type: Armored car
- Place of origin: United States

Service history
- In service: trials only
- Used by: United States Army
- Wars: World War II

Production history
- Designer: Chrysler
- Designed: 1941
- No. built: 1 prototype

Specifications
- Crew: 4 (commander/loader, gunner, driver, assistant driver)
- Armor: 0.375–1 in (9.5–25.4 mm)
- Main armament: 1 x 37mm gun M6
- Engine: Dodge 105 hp (78 kW) engine
- Transmission: Clark 5-speed transmission
- Suspension: leaf spring

The T23 armored car was an entry from the Fargo Division Chrysler for a new fast tank destroyer to replace the M6 37mm gun motor carriage in July 1941 initiated by the U.S. Army Ordnance Department. Required specification was to be able to withstand fire from a .50 in (12.7 mm) machine gun to the front and side from a .30 in (7.62 mm) machine gun. Although Dwight D. Eisenhower's headquarters were in favor, the design was rejected in favor of the Ford T22.

== Design ==
The design was a traditional 6x6 armored truck frame vehicle with a Dodge 105 horsepower engine toward the rear and a Clark 5-speed transmission. The design was supposedly going to incorporate a hull mounted machine gun and floatation devices for amphibious assaults, but those additions never made it past the planning phase.
