= T17 Deerhound =

American WWII armored vehicle

T17 armored car
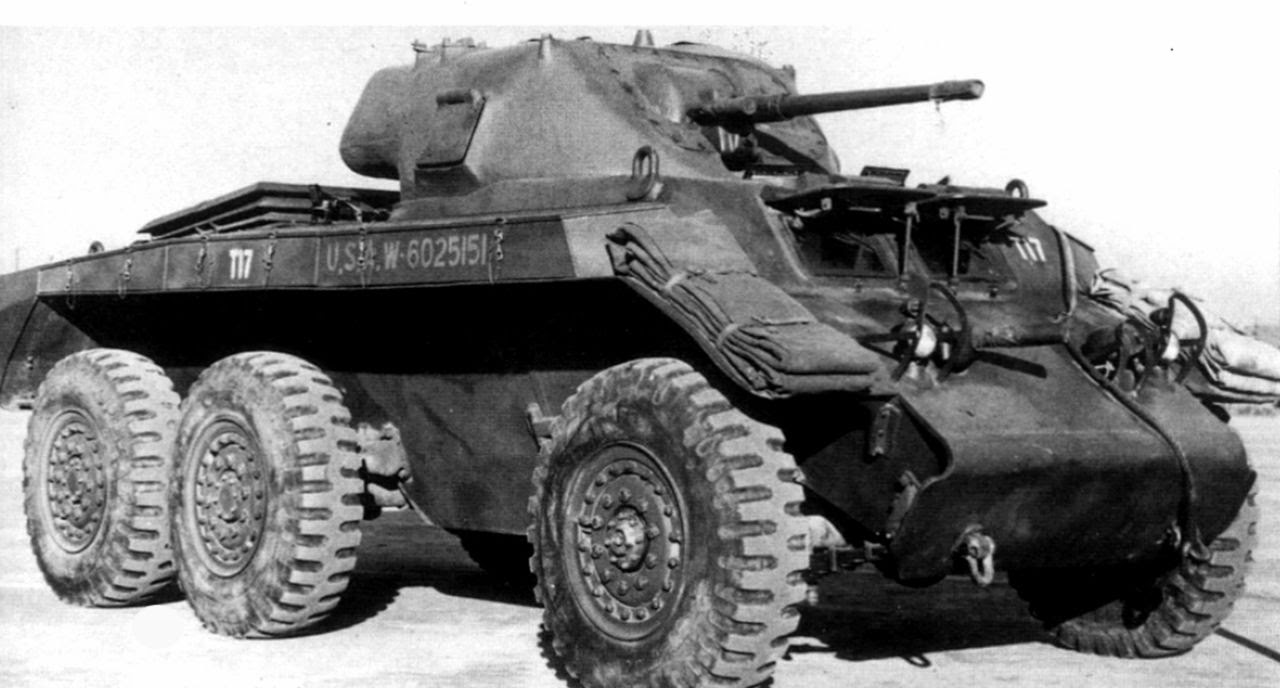
- Place of origin: United States

Service history
- Used by: United States Army
- Wars: World War II

Production history
- Designer: Ford Motor Company
- Designed: 1941–42
- Manufacturer: Ford Motor Company
- Produced: 1942–43
- No. built: 250

Specifications
- Mass: 17 short tons (15 t)
- Length: 18.21 ft (5.55 m)
- Width: 8.86 ft (2.70 m)
- Height: 7.71 ft (2.35 m)
- Crew: 5
- Main armament: 37 mm Gun M6
- Secondary armament: 2 x .30 in M1919 machine guns
- Engine: 2 x Hercules JXD 6-cylinder petrol engines 90 hp (67 kW) each
- Drive: 6x6
- Operational range: 450 mi (720 km)
- Maximum speed: 56 mph (90 km/h)
- References: Christopher Foss & Military Factory

The T17 armored car, sometimes referred to as the M5 medium armored car and by the British as the Deerhound, was an American six-wheeled armored car produced during the Second World War.

The T17 lost out to the T17E design for British use but 250 vehicles were produced as a stopgap for the United States Army until their preferred design, the M8 armored car was available.

== History ==
The T17 armored car was developed by the Ford Motor Company. and was one of two designs submitted to meet a 1941 Ordnance Department requirement (which also met a British Army Staff requirement) for a medium armored car for Armored Force, the other being the Chevrolet four wheel drive T17E1 armored car.

A contract for one pilot model each of the T17 and T17E was placed. Testing of these led to production contracts for 2,260 T17 armored cars in January 1942 with a contract for a further 1,500 in June 1942. The T17E1 was also ordered in similar amounts.

In the early 1940s the US Army was pursuing a number of heavy, medium and light armored car designs and, in an effort to reduce the number of competing programs, in October 1942 Headquarters Army Ground Forces commissioned the Special Armored Vehicle Board (known as the "Palmer Board" after its head Brigadier General W. B. Palmer) to impose some standardization. After tests in winter of 1942–43, the Palmer Board recommended the termination of all programs except the concurrent Ford T22, which in T22E2 form entered service as the M8 Greyhound. The Board recommended a utility car version of the T22 (M20) and allowed the completion of the 250 T17 already being produced.

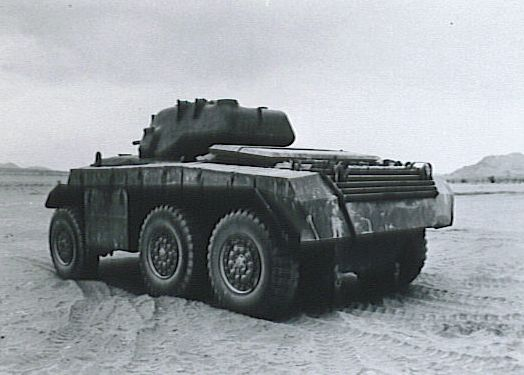
Rear view.

The British Purchasing Commission continued to show interest in the two medium designs and asked the US Army Desert Warfare Board to conduct trials of the two designs, which were completed in February 1943, the Chevrolet T17E1 design emerging as the clear winner. Despite this, the US Army authorized Ford to complete 250 vehicles as a stopgap until production of the M8 commenced. The first 32 T17s were produced in 1942, the remaining 218 were completed in 1943.

In US Army service the T17 was sometimes referred to as the 'M5 Medium Armored Car', despite never being standardized. All vehicles had their 37 mm main guns removed and were assigned to the United States Army Military Police Corps for patrol duties in the continental United States.

== Design ==
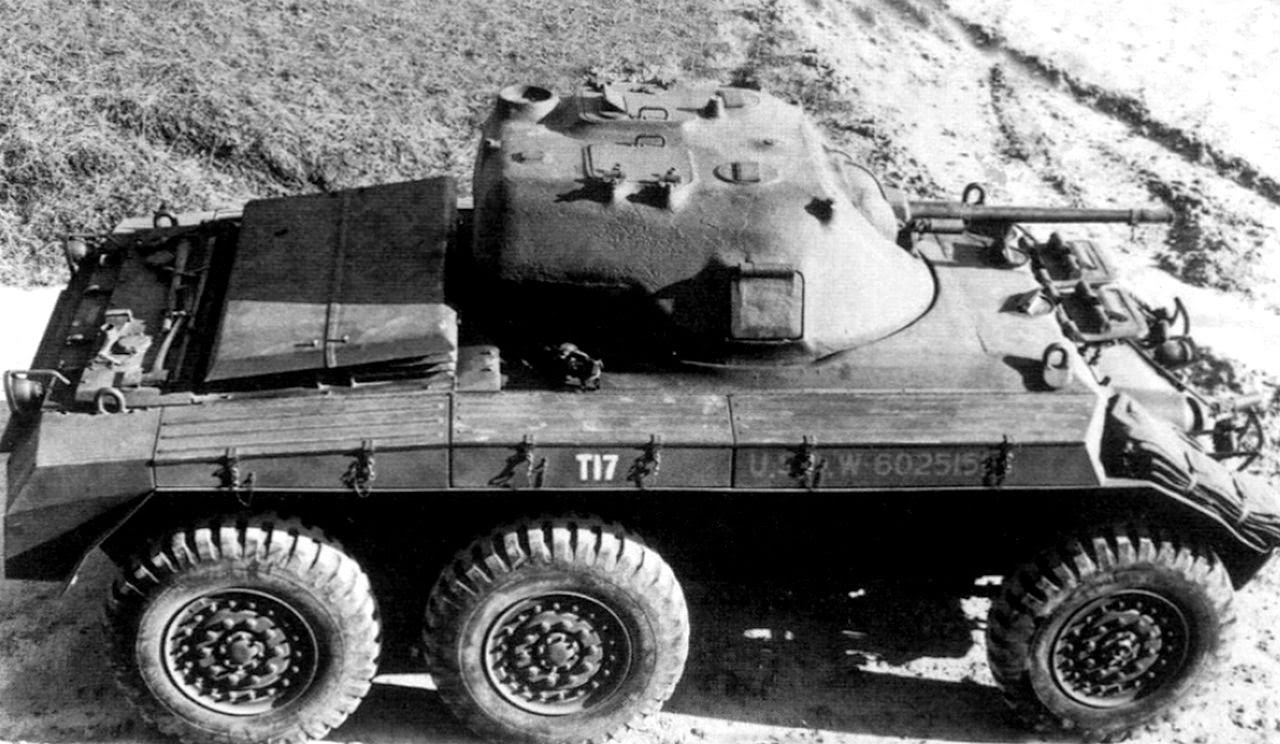
Side view.

The T17 armored car was a turreted 6x6 vehicle with a crew of five: driver, co-driver, gunner, loader and commander. The T17 and T17E1 both used the same turret designed by Rock Island Arsenal fitted with the combination gun mount from the M3 Lee medium tank, armed with a 37 mm M6 tank gun and coaxial .30-inch M1919 Browning machine gun. A second M1919 machine gun was mounted in the bow of the hull.

== See also ==
- List of U.S. military vehicles by model number
