= M38 Wolfhound =

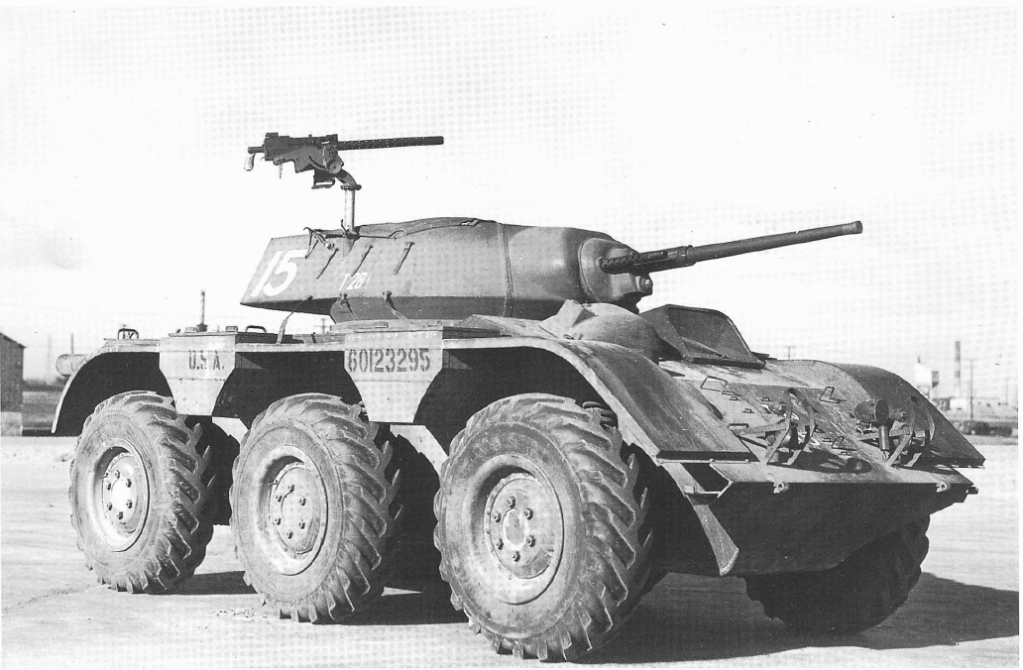
- Type: Armored car
- Place of origin: United States

Specifications
- Mass: 6.9 t (6.8 long tons; 7.6 short tons)
- Length: 5.11 m (16 ft 9 in)
- Width: 2.44 m (8 ft 0 in)
- Height: 1.98 m (6 ft 6 in)
- Crew: 4
- Armor: 6 to 12 mm
- Main armament: 37 mm M6
- Secondary armament: .30 caliber Browning M1919A4 machine gun.50 caliber (12.7 mm) Browning M2 machine gun
- Engine: Cadillac 42, V-8, gasoline 148/110 hp (110/82 kW)
- Power/weight: 19.3/14.3 hp/tonne
- Suspension: wheels, 6×6
- Operational range: 483 km (300 mi)
- Maximum speed: 97 km/h (60 mph)

The M38 Wolfhound was a 6×6 US armored car produced in 1944 by the Chevrolet division of General Motors. It was designed as a replacement for the M8 Greyhound series, but the end of the war in 1945 led to the cancellation of the project after the completion of a handful of prototype vehicles.

== Specifications ==
The Wolfhound had a crew of four and was armed with a 37 mm gun in a rotating open-topped turret, with an ammunition load of 93 rounds. Its secondary armament consisted of two machine guns; one mounted co-axially with the main weapon, the other on an AA pintle mounting. It was powered by a Cadillac, eight-cylinder, water-cooled engine. Each side featured three large tires on symmetrically placed axles, with distinctive curved mudguards. The frontal glacis plate was sharply sloped to improve protection. A radio antenna was mounted on the front right of the glacis.

== Development history ==
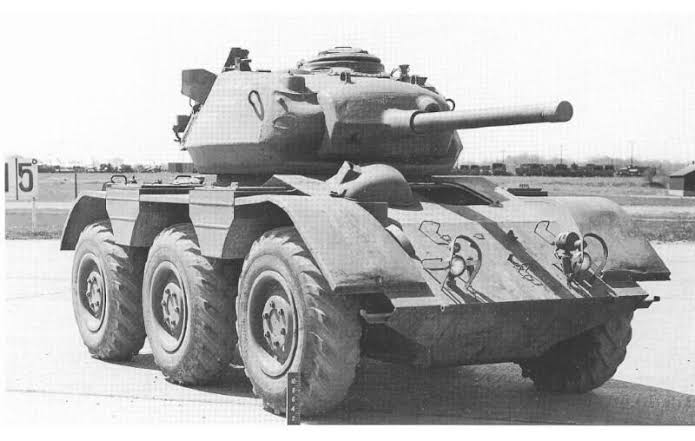
M38 fitted with a turret from the Chaffee

One M38 was modified to take the turret of an M24 Chaffee tank and went through a series of tests to check a possibility of upgunning the vehicle. The layout of the M38 had similarities with the Alvis Saladin, a post-war British armored car, but there was no link between them.

== See also ==
- M-numbers
