= Vosper 73 ft motor torpedo boat =

British WWII naval ship class

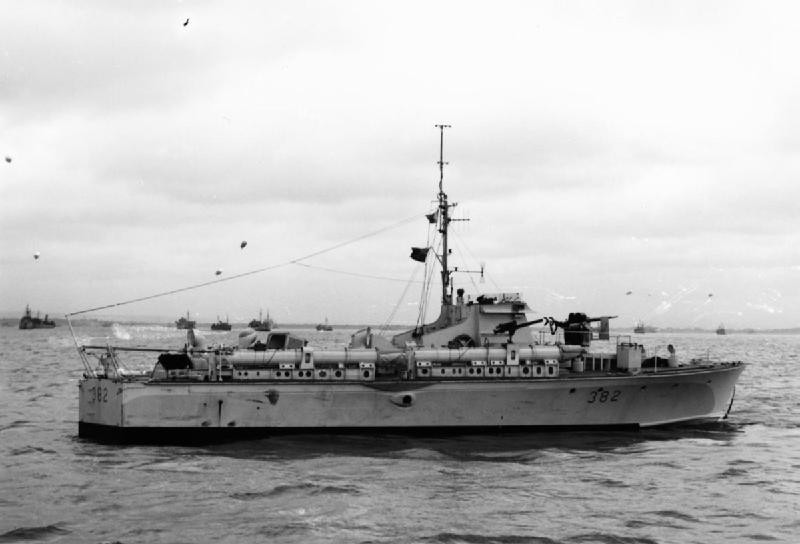
- MTB 382, a Vosper 73 ft type I MTB

Class overview
- Builders: Vosper & Company, Portsmouth
- Operators: Royal Navy
- Built: 1943-1945
- Planned: 32
- Completed: 29 (17 × type I, 12 × type II)
- Cancelled: 3 (type II)
- Lost: 1 (MTB-530, 28 March 1952)
- Preserved: 1

General characteristics
- Type: Motor torpedo boat
- Displacement: Type I : 44.5 long tons (45 t); Type II: 48.75 long tons (50 t)
- Length: 73 ft (22 m)
- Beam: 19 ft 6 in (5.94 m)
- Draught: 3 ft (0.91 m)
- Propulsion: 3 × 1,400 hp (1,000 kW) Packard petrol engines
- Speed: 40 knots (74 km/h; 46 mph)
- Complement: 13
- Armament: Type I; 4 × 18-inch (450 mm) torpedo tubes; 1 × 20mm Oerlikon gun; 4 × .303 Vickers K machine guns; Type II; 1 × QF 6 pounder gun; 2 × 18-inch torpedo tubes; 1 × 20mm Oerlikon gun; 4 × .303 Lewis guns
- Armour: Armour plate around the bridge

The Vosper 73 foot Motor Torpedo Boat was a mid-twentieth century British motor torpedo boat (MTB) designed by Vosper that served in the Royal Navy Coastal Forces during the Second World War.

At 73 ft (22 m) long they were considered small boats compared to longer designs such as the Fairmile D.

== Development ==
The design came about from a requirement that British motor torpedo boats should be better able to fight other small craft, which was the job of motor gun boats (MGB). To this end Vospers built on their existing 70-foot (21 m) designs, and the design was tested with MTB 379. Sixteen (MTB 380–345) were ordered in 1943. A second contract for five more (MTB 523–527) with heavier gun armament was placed in December.

The boats carried four 18-inch torpedo tubes as their major offensive armament along with Oerlikon 20 mm cannon and some defensive armament (two twin Vickers K machine guns, one either side) for protection against enemy aircraft. The type II gave up two torpedo tubes, but gained a QF 6 pounder gun which displaced the Oerlikon to the aft deck. This made it more capable of performing the MGB role.

== Service ==
The first of the type Is entered service in 1944 but the type II wasn't introduced before the end of the Second World War. Of the 29 built to this design none survives, although a slightly earlier model 60 ft (18 m) example has been saved and resides at the Imperial War Museum Duxford. MTB382 was sold (minus the three Packard engines) in 1947 and converted into a houseboat, berthed on the Chelmer & Blackwater canal at Heybridge Basin, Essex. She was renamed 'M.Y. Vixen' and remained in use as such until late 1953. She lay empty in the canal through the 1953 East Coast storm and tide surge which broke the banks of the canal, but left the flat planing-hull quite unaffected. All attempts to sell the boat thereafter failed, so she was subsequently broken up for scrap over the next year or so on the mudflats of the River Blackwater outside the Heybridge Basin sea-lock.
