= Coastal Forces of the Royal Navy =

British Royal Navy unit

Coastal Forces
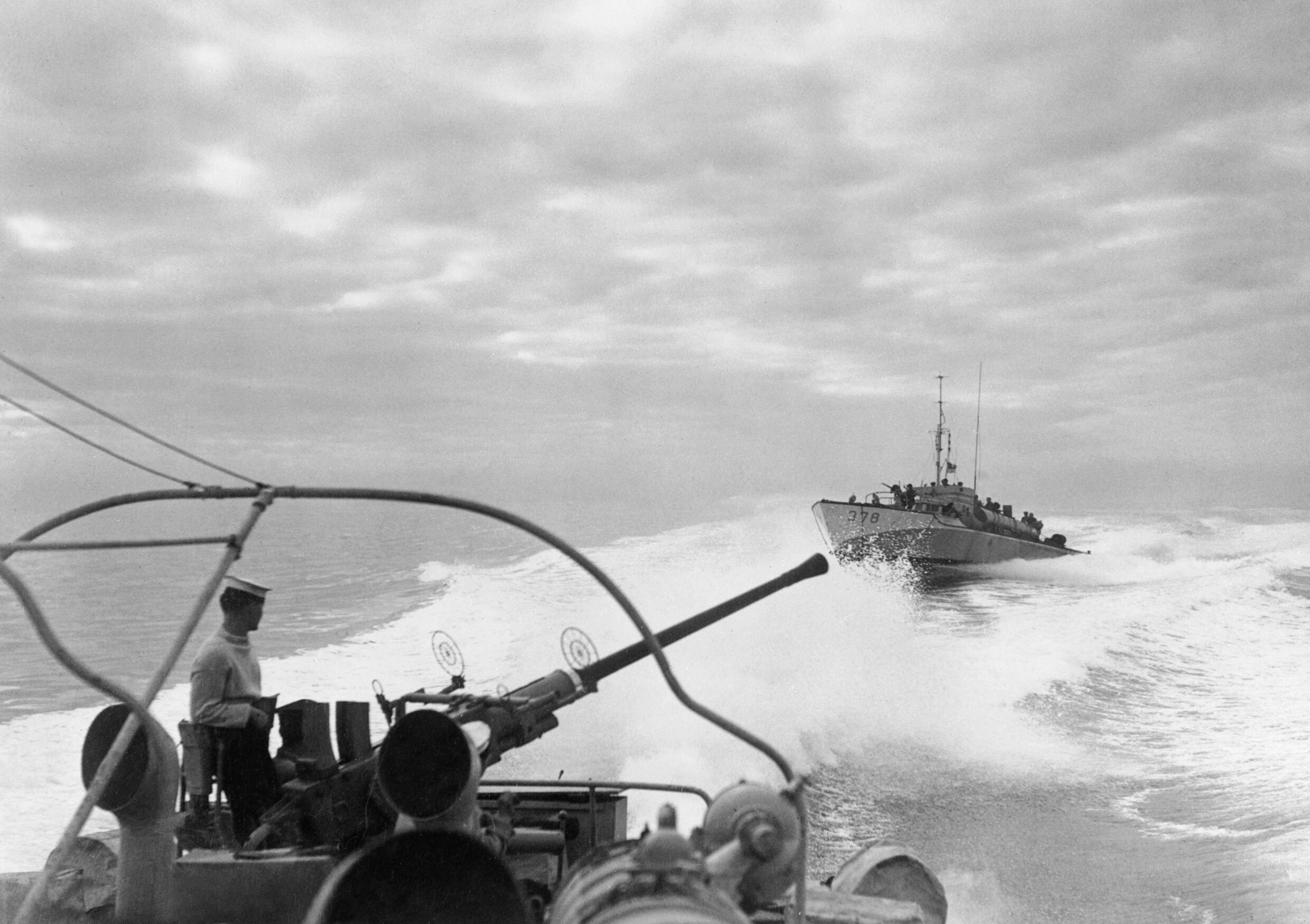
- Motor torpedo boats in the Mediterranean, February 1945
- Active: 1914–1918, 1939–1968, 2020–present
- Country: United Kingdom
- Branch: Royal Navy
- Type: Naval force

Commanders
- Commander: Rear Admiral Coastal Forces

Coastal Forces Squadron
- Active: 2020–
- Country: United Kingdom
- Branch: Royal Navy
- Type: Naval force
- Size: Two divisions (14 P2000 patrol boats and 3 offshore patrol vessels)

Coastal Forces was a division of the Royal Navy initially established during World War I, and then again in World War II under the command of Rear-Admiral, Coastal Forces. It remained active until the last minesweepers to wear the "HM Coastal Forces" cap tally were taken out of reserve in 1968. The division received more gallantry awards than any other branch of the Royal Navy during that period.

In 2020, ministerial approval for the change in name from 1st Patrol Boat Squadron to Coastal Forces Squadron was given. It encompasses 14 of 16 Archer-class patrol vessels and the Batch 1 River-class offshore patrol vessels and is responsible for UKEEZ Protection and Patrol.

== History ==
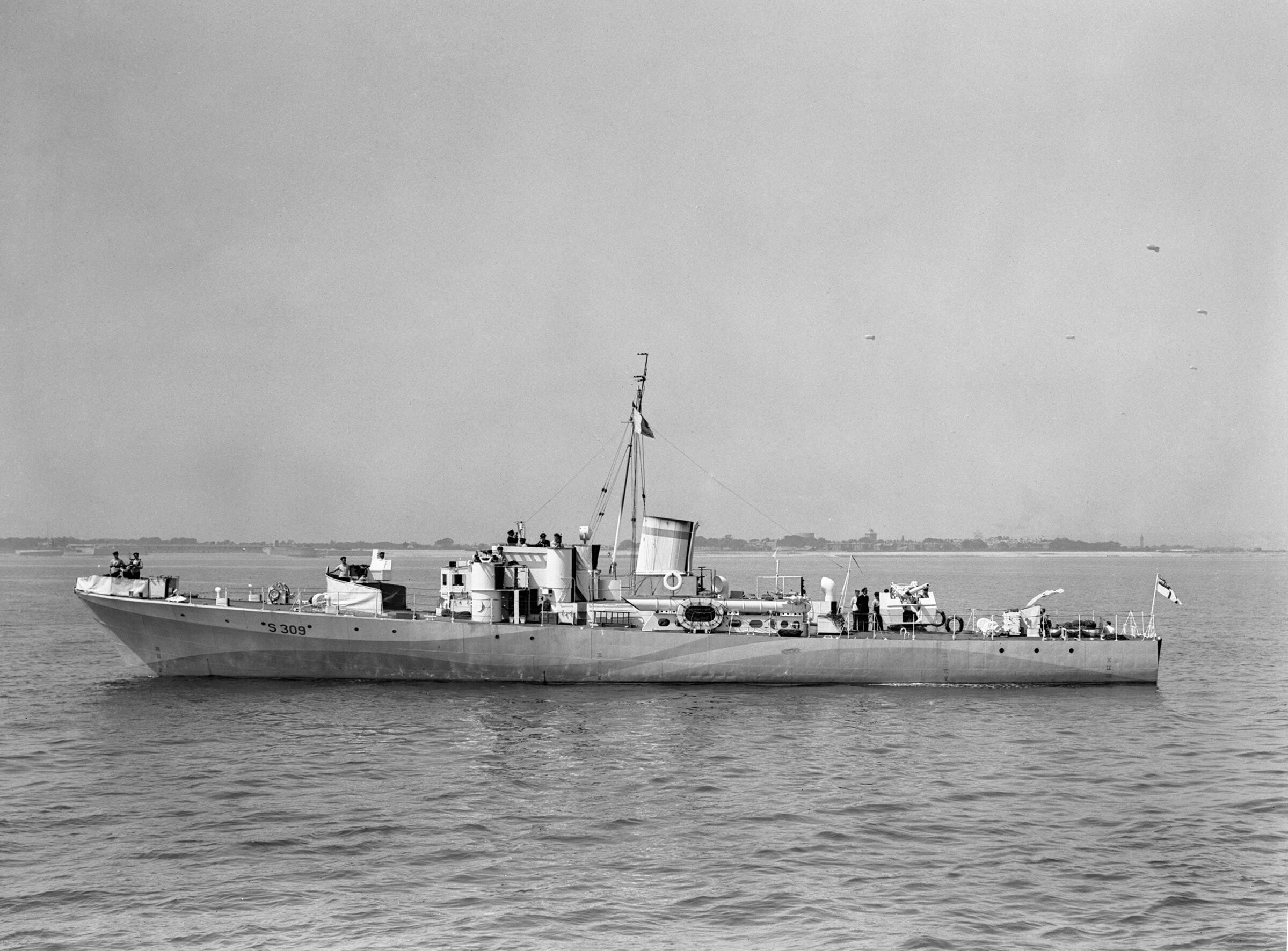
The steam gun boat Grey Goose

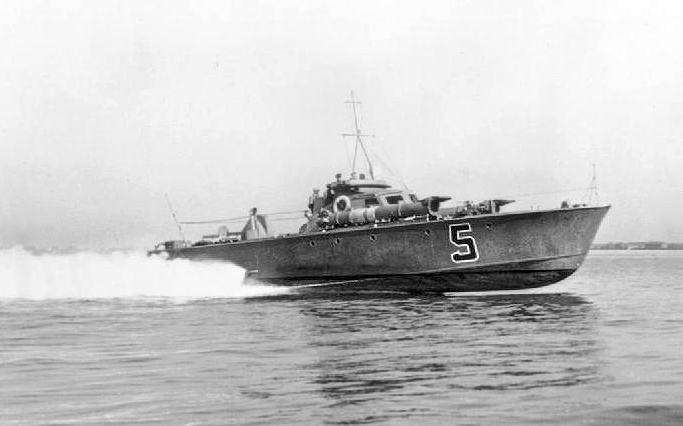
MTB 5 c. 1939-1945

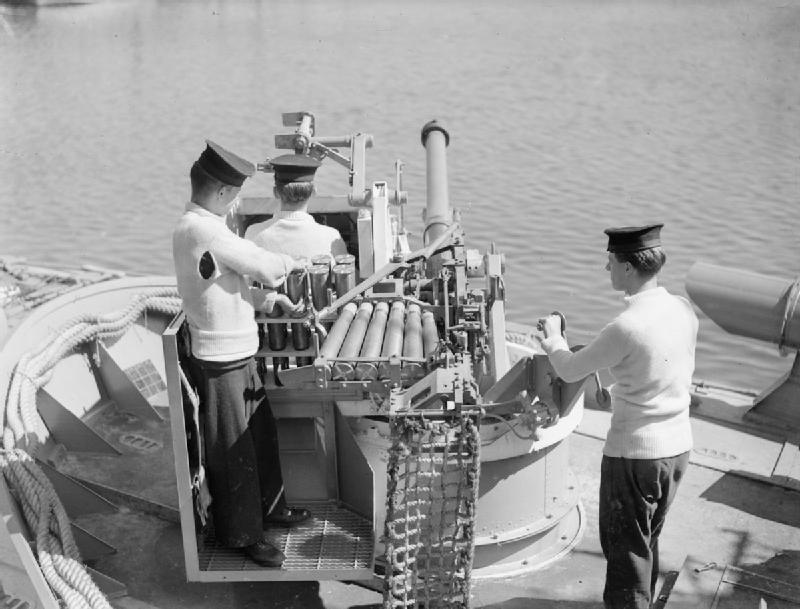
Crewmen with a Molins autoloading 57-mm gun on a Fairmile D motor torpedo boat during World War II

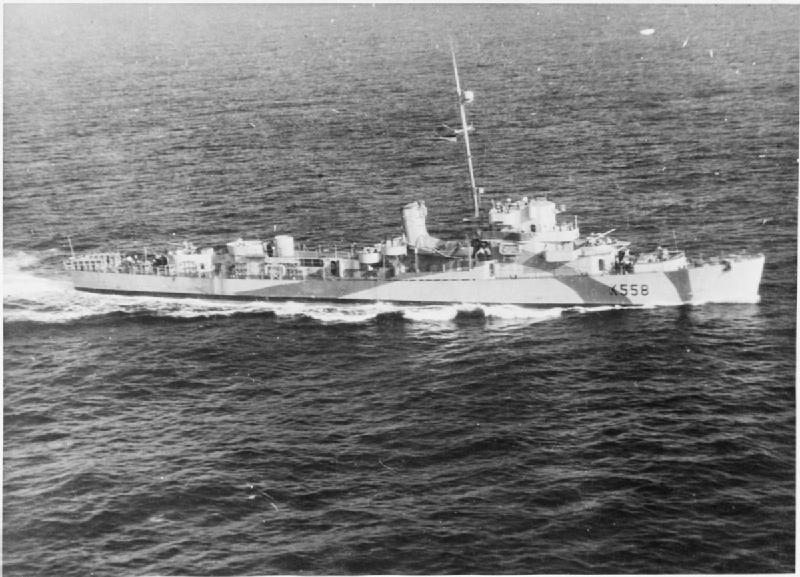
The Royal Navy Captain-class frigate HMS Rutherford underway during World War II. She served as a coastal forces control frigate in 1944 and 1945.

=== Predecessor ===
The Royal Navy had previously operated flotillas of small torpedo- and depth-charge-armed craft (coastal motor boats) during World War I (1914–1918). They operated as often in action against the enemy coast as in defence of British coastal areas.

=== Establishment ===
The first post WWI motor torpedo boats built for the Royal Navy were built by the British Powerboat Company at Hythe, Southampton. MTBs 01-19 were built between 1935 and 1938, following the hard chine planing hull design.

During World War II (1939–1945), the first Coastal Forces headquarters was set up at HMS Vernon in 1940 under Rear Admiral Piers Kekewich, Flag Officer Coastal Forces. The chief staff officer to the admiral was Augustus Agar, VC, who had commanded coastal motor boats during World War I and in British operations in the Baltic Sea in 1918 and 1919 in support of White Russian forces during the Russian Civil War.

=== World War II operations ===
Royal Navy Coastal Forces craft operated mainly in the English Channel and North Sea waters. They were also based in Malta, The 1st & 3rd MTB Flotillas, Numbers 01-06 & 14-19, and HMS Tamar, Hong Kong, the 2nd MTB Flotilla, numbers 07-12, 26 & 27.

On 19 December 1941 MTB 07 led the attack on Japanese landing craft in Kowloon Harbour, Hong Kong, taking fire from land, sea and air. The operation was arguably the most daring daylight MTB raid of all time losing over 40% of the flotilla. MTB 07 was hit 97 times losing two crew dead and all three engines. It was hailed as the "Balaclava of the sea".

They were also used in the Mediterranean and off the Norwegian coastline. They were used at the St. Nazaire Raid and the Dieppe Raid. They were used to attack German convoys and their S-boat (known to the Allies as "E-Boat") escorts, carry out clandestine raids and landings, and pick up secret agents in Norway and Brittany. Alongside British officers and sailors, the coastal craft were crewed by various Allied nationalities including Dutch, Norwegian, Canadian, Australian, and New Zealanders.

A number of Captain-class frigates were configured to operate as "coastal forces control frigates" (CFCF). Operating with Coastal Forces officers embarked and responsible for controlling and providing radar support to groups of Coastal Forces' motor torpedo boats intercepting German motor torpedo boats in the North Sea, these frigates were involved in the destruction of at least 26 E-Boats.

By 1944 Coastal Forces numbered 3,000 officers and 22,000 ratings. Altogether there were 2,000 British Coastal Forces craft. Affectionately known as the Royal Navy's "little ships", they fought over 900 actions and sank around 400 enemy vessels, including 48 E-boats and 32 midget submarines. They fired 1,169 torpedoes, shot down 32 enemy aircraft and carried out many mine laying operations. 170 of the "little ships" were sunk or otherwise destroyed.

=== Post-World War II ===
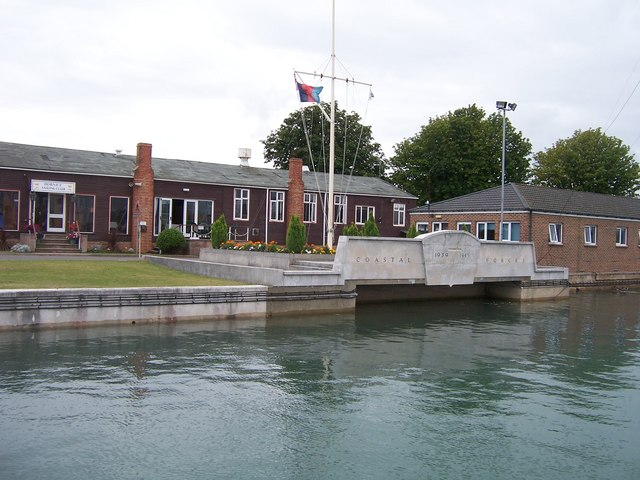
Coastal Forces memorial at the former HMS Hornet, Gosport

After World War II, the Royal Navy re-designated all its motor torpedo boats (MTBs) and motor gun boats (MGBs) as "fast patrol boats." The Brave-class fast patrol boats were the last craft to be built for the Coastal Forces, and the Coastal Forces were disbanded as a separate unit. A memorial to those lost was erected in 1954 at their last base, (HMS Hornet), which was decommissioned in 1956.

In 1960, a question was asked in the House of Lords why Coastal Forces had been reduced to a skeleton of three patrol boats and three ships operated by two crews, based at HMS Dolphin in Gosport, when considerable expenditure was made in the 1950s but not followed up, and thus wasted. In addition, Coastal Forces was invaluable as a means of training young officers, and the development of small ships, often to the benefit of the navies of Britain's allies. Lord Carrington, then First Lord of the Admiralty, responded that limited resources and changing threats were the reason, and that keeping the Coastal Forces at a low level would at least enable it to be rapidly expanded should the need arise. He added that nine boats were in operational reserve to maintain Britain's NATO commitment.

The last sailors to wear the "HM Coastal Forces" cap tally were the ship's companies of the inshore minesweepers Dittisham and Flintham on being taken out of reserve in 1968, before individual cap tallies for the minesweepers had been manufactured and issued.

The memorial at Hornet was re-dedicated in 2019 in a ceremony to mark the D-Day 75 Commemorations, which was attended by a WWII craft and two modern vessels.

A permanent exhibition of craft, personnel and history of Coastal Forces was established in Gosport in 2021. The exhibition shows that, with 3,000 decorations, including four Victoria Crosses, Coastal Forces personnel received more gallantry awards than any other branch of the Royal Navy.

== Craft types used ==
Coastal Forces included the following types of coastal defence craft:

Type	Designation	Built	Lost	Designed purpose
Motor launches	ML, HDML, RML			Harbour Defence Motor Launch and submarine chasing or rescue motor launches.
Motor Gun Boats	MGB			
Steam Gun Boats	SGB	7	1	Hunting down German E-boats
Motor torpedo boats	MTB			

At the outbreak of World War II in September 1939 there were three flotillas totalling 18 motor torpedo "short boats" between 60 ft (18 m) and 72 feet (22 m) long. These could typically maintain 40 knots (74 km/h; 46 mph) and were armed with two torpedo tubes. They were built mainly by the British Power Boat Company, Vospers, and Thornycroft.

In 1940 a modified craft, the motor gun boat (MGB), was introduced. These were armed with weapons such as the 0.5 in (12.7 mm) Vickers machine gun, 2-pounder (40 mm) "pom pom", a single or twin 20 mm Oerlikon cannon and ultimately the 6-pounder (57 mm) gun with autoloader.

It was also apparent that larger craft were needed as the operational capability of the short boats was too restricted by sea conditions. Fairmile designed a series of larger coastal craft, up to 120 feet (37 m) long. The Fairmile A Type and B Type were Motor Launches and the C Type was a motor gun boat.

In 1943 the Fairmile D Type appeared. It was a motor torpedo boat – nicknamed the "Dog Boat" – and was designed as a counter to the German S-boat (known to the Allies as the "E-boat"). It could be fitted as either a gun or a torpedo boat, so the designation MGB and MTB tended to be intermixed or 'MGB/MTB' used. It was a good sea boat and could maintain 30 knots (56 km/h) at full load. The later D types carried four 18-inch (460 mm) torpedo tubes.

The Vosper Type I MTB appeared in 1943. This was a 73-foot (22 m) craft with four 18-inch (460 mm) torpedo tubes and was capable of a maximum speed of 40 knots (74 km/h).

== Bases ==
Coastal Forces bases were located around the British coast and at major locations overseas.

South coast

- HMS Attack, Portland
- HMS Bee, then HMS Grasshopper, Weymouth
- HMS Bee, Weymouth 1942–1943
- HMS Bee, Holyhead 1943–1945
- HMS Black Bat, Plymouth
- HMS Hornet, Haslar, Gosport
- HMS Tadpole, Poole
- HMS Wasp, Dover Coastal Forces

West coast

- HMS Ferret II Port of Londonderry, Northern Ireland
- HMS Seahawk Ardrishaig, Argyll
- HMS St Christopher Fort William, Inverness-shire

East Coast

- HMS Badger, Harwich
- HMS Beehive, Felixstowe
- HMS Midge, Great Yarmouth
- HMS Minos II, then HMS Mantis, Lowestoft
- HMS Sandfly, Peterhead
- HMS Flora II, Invergordon
- HMS Flora III, Invergordon

Mediterranean

- HMS Gregale, Malta
- HMS Mosquito, HMS Regea, Alexandria, Egypt
- HMS Razorbill, Algiers
- HMS Hannibal, Algiers

Indo-china

- HMIS Cheetah, Bombay (Royal Indian Navy)

Other

- HMS Argyll
- HMS Aggressive, Newhaven, Sussex
- HMS Beaver II, Immingham
- HMS Britannia III, Dartmouth
- HMS Cicala, Dartmouth
- HMS Claverhouse, Leith
- HMS Dartmouth II, Dartmouth
- HMS Fervent, Ramsgate
- HMS Forte IV, Falmouth
- HMS Forward II, Newhaven
- HMS Fox Lerwick
- HMS Castle Harbour, Royal Naval Dockyard, Bermuda

== Commonwealth coastal forces ==
Although British Commonwealth coastal forces operated independently from British ones, they used similar vessels:

Coastal forces of	Type	Built	Lost	Notes
Canada	Fairmile B motor launch Fairmile D motor torpedo boat BPB motor torpedo boat	80; 10; 11		
Australia	Harbour defence motor launch Fairmile B motor launch	31; 35		
New Zealand	Harbour defence motor launch Fairmile B motor launch	16; 12		

== Surviving craft ==
Vessel	Description	Built	Builder	In the care of	Condition
HDML 1387 Medusa	Harbour defence launch which took part in the Normandy landings.	1943	R.A.Newman & sons	Medusa Trust	restored to original condition
MTB 102	Prototype for World War II MTBs	1937	Vosper	MTB102 Trust	still seaworthy
MTB 331	55 ft (17 m) Stepped-hull motor torpedo boat - sole survivor	1941	Thornycroft	British Military Powerboat Trust	Intention to get her seaworthy
MGB 81	71.5 ft (21.8 m) Motor gunboat	1942	British Power Boat Company	Portsmouth Naval Base Property Trust	Fully operational, based at Portsmouth Historic Dockyard.
MTB 71	60 ft (18 m) Motor torpedo boat	1940	Vosper		Static exhibit

Some surviving motor launches in British waters were taken on as pleasure boats and a number of them are on the National Register of Historic Vessels.

== Re-formation 2020 ==
The name "Coastal Forces Squadron", replacing the previous title of "1st Patrol Boat Squadron", was re-adopted in May 2020. As of 2023, the Coastal Forces Squadron comprises two divisions: the Off-shore division comprising the three Batch 1 River-class offshore patrol vessels and the In-shore division comprising 14 of 16 Archer-class fast patrol boats. Headquartered at HMNB Portsmouth, as of the mid-2020s the In-shore division of the squadron is playing an increasing role in supporting Royal Navy exercises beyond U.K. waters in both the Baltic and the Norwegian Seas.

In 2023, four ships from Coastal Forces took part in an exercise with the Norwegian Coastal Ranger Command inside the Arctic Circle.

The exercise was repeated in 2024 when four vessels of the Squadron, Biter, Blazer, Trumpeter and Exploit, deployed to northern Norway as part of the NATO exercise "Steadfast Defender". In June 2024, HMS Puncher and her sister ship HMS Pursuer, embarked personnel from the Navy's the Mine and Threat Exploitation Group and deployed for exercises in the Baltic. The vessels operated an IVER 3 Autonomous Vehicle and a Video Ray Defender remotely operated vehicle to find mines on the seabed.

In 2025, six vessels of the squadron, Archer, Biter, Dasher, Example, Pursuer and Smiter, again deployed to the Baltic for joint exercises with allied naval forces.

In 2026, the Royal Navy acquired around 20 K-3 Scout USVs for operation with the Surface Flotilla, principally the Coastal Forces Squadron and 47 Commando, Royal Marines.

== See also ==
- Royal Naval Patrol Service
- Trawlers of the Royal Navy
- Coastal Forces of World War II
- Coastal Forces of the Royal Canadian Navy
- Coastal Forces of the Royal Australian Navy
- Coastal Forces of the Royal New Zealand Navy
- Robert Peverell Hichens RNVR MTB Flotilla leader
