= T18E2 =

T18E2 may refer to:

- Development prototype of the M75 armored personnel carrier
- T18 Boarhound variant
