= Coastal Forces of World War II =

List of off-shore military forces

During World War II, the parties to the conflict protected their coasts with a variety of off-shore coastal forces that were distinct from their general naval forces. This article lists the coastal forces of each country who had them, and the craft that they used.

== Coastal Forces of the United Kingdom ==
Coastal Forces was a division of the Royal Navy established during World War II. It consisted of small coastal defence craft which the Navy designated with names such as: Motor Launch, High Speed Launch, air-sea rescue, Motor Gun Boat and Motor Torpedo Boat. It did not include landing craft, trawlers or purpose-built minesweepers. Other Navies operated equivalent boats, but classified and named them somewhat differently.

Type	Designation	Built	Lost	Designed purpose
Motor Launches	ML, HDML ASR			Harbour Defence Motor Launches (HDML) and submarine chasing or for armed high speed Air Sea Rescue.
Motor Gun Boats	MGB			
Steam Gun Boats	SGB	7	1	Hunting down German E-boats
Motor Torpedo Boats	MTB			

== Coastal Forces of the United States ==
The United States Coast Guard provided war time coastal protection. The Coastal Picket Force augmented the Coast Guard with civilian auxiliary service from 1942–1945.

Type	Designation	Built	Lost	Designed purpose
PT boats	PT-			
Submarine chasers	SC- and PC-			

== Coastal Forces of Germany ==
Type	Designation	Built	Lost	Designed purpose
Schnellboot (E-boats)	S-			
R boat				

== Coastal Forces of Italy ==
Type	Designation	Built	Lost	Designed purpose
MAS-boat				
Motoscafo Silurante		36		

== Post war ==
Post war there seemed to be no need for small coastal force vessels. They were generally withdrawn and their functions taken over by larger corvettes, frigates, and destroyers. A few remained in service with Third World navies. The RN's last boats built in any number were the Dark-class fast patrol boats of the mid-1950s; Coastal Forces was reduced in 1957 to a few vessels.

In time, the need for smaller vessels re-asserted itself, as in this experience of the Royal Australian Navy:

The motor launches quickly passed out of service after the war and coastal patrol duties once more devolved upon larger RAN ships. From the early 1960s the Ton class minesweepers took on significant patrol responsibilities, particularly during the Indonesian Confrontation from 1962-1966. This experience led directly to the decision to reintroduce patrol boats to the RAN inventory, as the minesweepers were expensive to maintain and their engines were not designed to loiter on patrol.

—

Coastal boats reappeared in navies around the world now generally adapted to the need to "patrol" and designated as "patrol boats".

== Surviving craft ==
Following is a list of notable surviving coastal craft from World War II.

Vessel MGB81	Country Great Britain	Type Motor Gun Boat	Design British Powerboat Company	Built 1942	In the care of Portsmouth Naval Base Property Trust	Notes
HNoMS Hitra	Norway	submarine chaser				Only remaining World War II submarine chaser with intact armament
S-130	Germany	E-boat		1943	British Military Powerboat Trust	Only surviving German E-boot. Participated in Exercise Tiger and attacks on the D-Day invasion fleet.
PT 617	US	PT-boat	80-foot Elco		Battleship Cove Museum	Only completely restored 80-foot Elco PT-boat in existence
PT 796	US	PT-boat	78-foot Higgins		Battleship Cove Museum	restored
MTB 102	UK	MTB	Private venture	1937	MTB 102 Trust	capable of 48 knots unladen

== See also ==
- Submarine chaser
- PT boat
- British Power Boat Company – producer of the PT boat prototype
- Canadian Power Boat Company
- Patrol boat
- USCG Patrol Boat
- Fast Attack Craft – modern classification
- List of patrol vessels of the United States Navy
