= HMS Mosquito (shore establishment) =

Royal Navy shore base from 1942 to 1945

Coordinates: 31.1974°N 29.8674°E

History

United Kingdom
- Name: HMS Mosquito
- Commissioned: 15 February 1942
- Decommissioned: 1 December 1945

General characteristics
- Class & type: Stone frigate

HMS Mosquito was a Royal Navy coastal forces base at Alexandria, Egypt during the Second World War. The base was operational from 1942 to 1945 as a repair centre and base for coastal forces boats.

Mosquito was commissioned at Mahroussa Jetty on 15 February 1942. The base and slipways were situated alongside King Farouk's palace. The accounts were centralised at HMS Nile and Mosquito was established as an independent command. She had a nominated depot ship, the 16 foot Dinghy No. 1955. The base was in operation until being paid off to Care and Maintenance on 1 December 1945.

== Other locations ==
The site was extended to include a number of establishments around the south-eastern corner of the Mediterranean.

- Mosquito I - located in Haifa, being commissioned in October 1943 and finally paid off on 9 May 1945.
- Mosquito II - located in Beirut, Lebanon, commissioned in 1942 and paid off on 9 May 1945.
- Mosquito III - located in Benghazi, Cyrenaica, established in 1942.
- Mosquito III - located in Port Said, paid off on 9 May 1945.
