= T18 Boarhound =

T18E2 Armoured Car
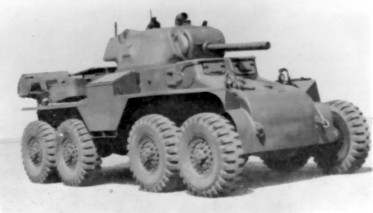
- Type: Armored car
- Place of origin: United States

Production history
- No. built: 30

Specifications
- Mass: 26.8 t (26.4 long tons; 29.5 short tons)
- Length: 6.2 m (20 ft 4 in)
- Width: 3.1 m (10 ft 2 in)
- Height: 2.6 m (8 ft 6 in)
- Crew: 5
- Armor: 9.5 to 50.8 mm
- Main armament: 57 mm gun M1
- Secondary armament: 2 x .30 Browning M1919A4 machine guns
- Engine: 2 x GMC 6-cylinder 2 x 125 hp / 2 x 92 kW
- Power/weight: 9.4 hp/tonne
- Suspension: wheels, 8 x 8
- Operational range: 400 km (250 mi)
- Maximum speed: 80 km/h (50 mph)

The T18 Boarhound was an American heavy armored car produced in small numbers for the British Army during the Second World War.

== History ==
In July 1941, the United States Army Ordnance Corps issued specifications for a heavy armored car (along with another specification for a medium armored car, which resulted in the T17 Deerhound and T17E1 Staghound) to be built for supply to the British. The prototype was developed in 1942 by the Yellow Coach Company. It was a large 8x8 (eight wheels, all driven; called an "eight-by-eight") vehicle with four front wheels used for steering. Thick armor brought the weight to 26 tons, about the weight of contemporary medium tanks. Initial armament consisted of a 37 mm gun M6 in a turret with a coaxial .30 inch machine gun and another .30 inch MG in the bow mount. By then, it was clear that the anti-tank performance of the 37 mm gun was insufficient and the production version, the T18E2, which was named Boarhound by the British, received the 57 mm gun M1, the US-manufactured variant of the British QF 6 pounder.

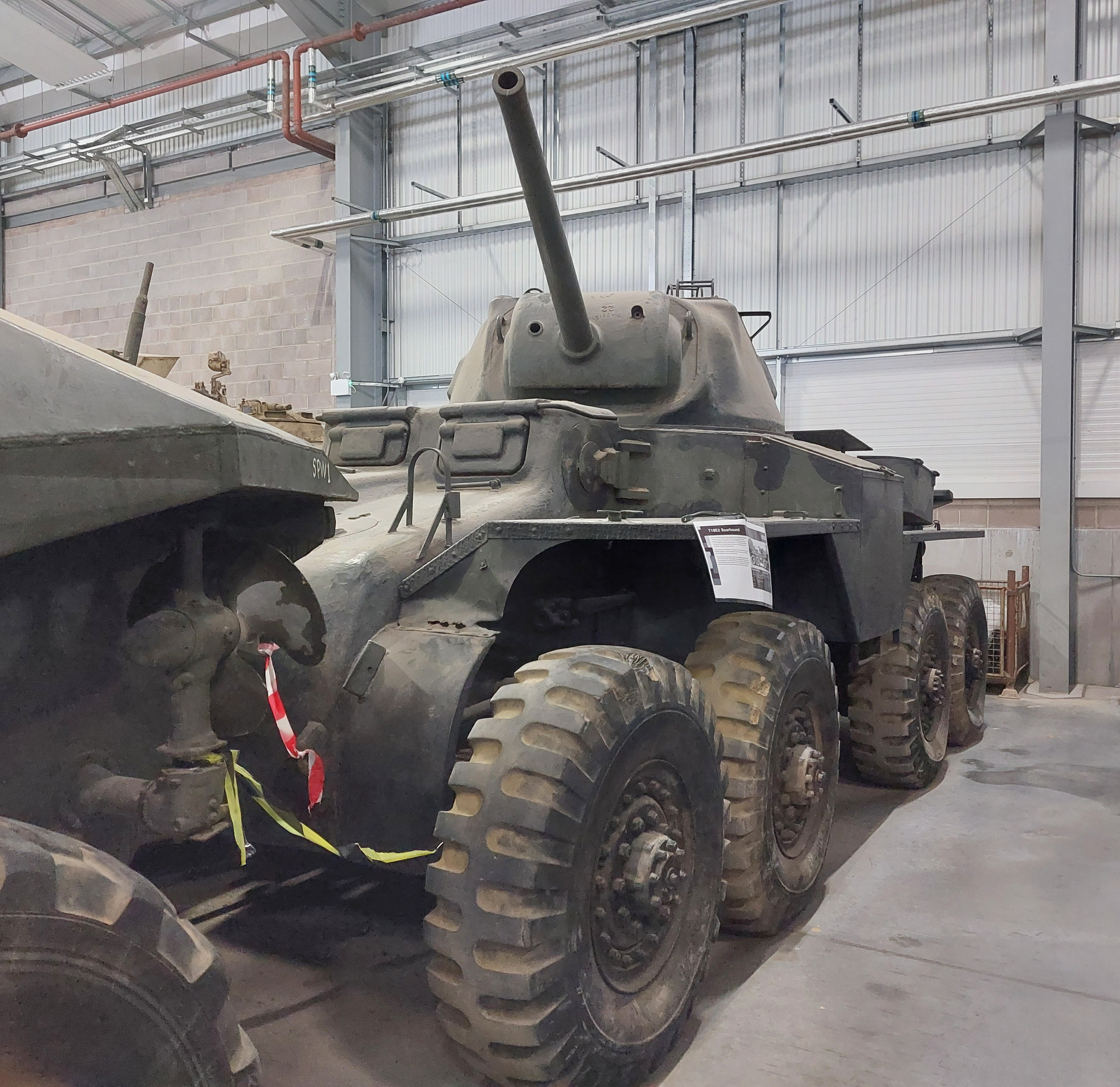
The only surviving T18, at The Tank Museum, Bovington (2024)

The United States Army had only shown minimal interest in the vehicle and retained the first 3 production vehicles. The British Army placed an order for 2,500 units, but high production costs and poor cross-country performance led to cancellation of the order with only 27 being delivered to North Africa. The T18 was never used widely in combat; however, a number were made use of by defending bases of operation in North Africa, with a few even taking part in convoy operations. There are accounts that a limited few were refitted for special duties in the rear echelon as well. Late in 1942, orders were issued for upwards of some eight Boarhounds to be assigned to the Eighth Army, which used them sparingly as supporting armored vehicles and, to some extent, in reconnaissance roles. None are said to have seen heavy action.

The only surviving vehicle is displayed in The Tank Museum, Bovington, United Kingdom.

For a wheeled vehicle, especially one made during the height of the African Campaign (which made it likely to serve in desert conditions) the T18 was simply too heavy. At 80 kilometers an hour, it did have a relatively high-top speed, but acceleration and turning were hampered by the somewhat thick frontal armor, which could reach 40mm in some places.

== Variants ==
- T18 - original version with 37 mm gun.
- T18E1 - six-wheeled version. Development stopped January 18, 1943
- T18E2 - version with 57 mm gun.

== See also ==
G-numbers
