= Fairmile D motor torpedo boat =

British motor torpedo and gunboat

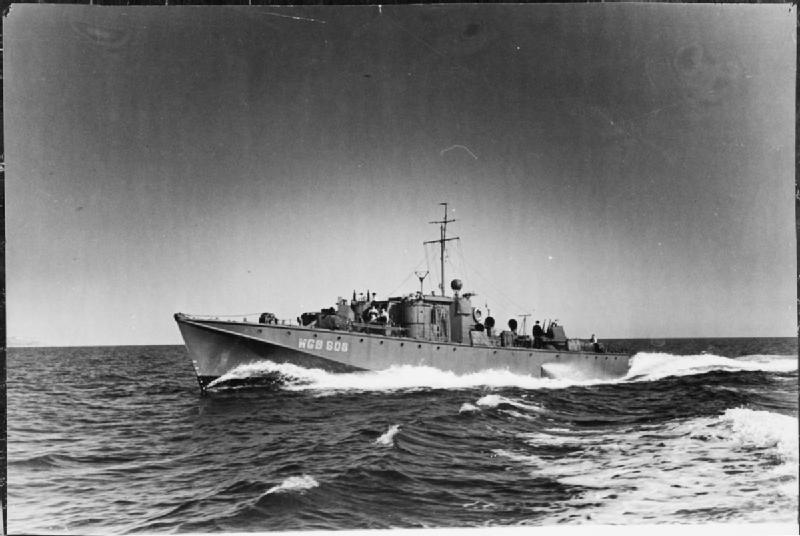
- The Fairmile D motor gun boat MGB 606

Class overview
- Name: Fairmile D motor gun boat
- Preceded by: Fairmile C motor gun boat
- Planned: 229
- Completed: 228
- Canceled: 1

General characteristics
- Displacement: As MTB; 102 long tons (104 t) standard; 118 long tons (120 t) full load; As MGB; 90 long tons (91 t) standard; 107 long tons (109 t) full load
- Length: 115 ft (35 m)
- Beam: 20 ft 10 in (6.35 m)
- Draft: 4 ft 9 in (1.45 m) to 4 ft 11 in (1.50 m) mean deep load
- Propulsion: 4 × Packard 4M 2500 petrol engines, total 5,000 hp (3,728 kW)
- Speed: 29 knots (54 km/h; 33 mph) at full load
- Range: 506 nmi (937 km; 582 mi) at max revolutions; 2,000 nmi (3,700 km; 2,300 mi) at 11 kn (20 km/h; 13 mph)
- Complement: 21
- Armament: 2 × single 6 pounder guns; 4 × 20mm Oerlikon (2 × single, 1 × twin); 2 × twin .303 Vickers K machine guns; 4 × light boat depth charges; Searchlight; TSA smoke generator
- Notes: Armament for gunboat configuration as fitted to MGB 658 by the end of the war. Specifications from Conway's All the World's Fighting Ships 1922–1946. and Motor Gunboat 658

The Fairmile D motor torpedo boat was a type of British motor torpedo boat (MTB) and motor gunboat (MGB), conceived by entrepreneur Noel Macklin of Fairmile Marine and designed by naval architect Bill Holt for the Royal Navy. Nicknamed "Dog Boats", they were designed to be assembled in kit form mass-produced by the Fairmile organisation and assembled at dozens of small boatbuilding yards around Britain, to combat the known advantages of the German E-boats over previous British coastal craft designs. At 35 metres (115 ft) in length, they were bigger than earlier MTB or motor gunboat (MGB) designs (which were typically around 21 metres (70 ft)) but slower, at 30 knots (56 km/h; 35 mph) compared to 40 knots (74 km/h; 46 mph).

== Boats ==
Holt combined a destroyer style bow with a Fairmile style stern, working with Fairmile from 1940 to develop a structure suitable for pre-fabrication. There was a supply of Packard engines due to lend-Lease and these were arranged as two pairs in the engine room expected to give a top speed of 31 knots.

=== 1941 Original Programme ===
The first twelve boats were ordered on 15 March 1941, becoming MGB 601 to MGB 612. Six weeks later, another 28 boats were ordered on 27 April 1941, as MGB 613 to MGB 616, and ML 617 to ML 640, although these MLs were quickly reclassed as MGBs. The prefix for all boats (except early losses 622, 631 and 639) was reclassed from "MGB" to "MTB" in September 1943.

Eight of these boats (nos. 618, 619, 620, 623, 625, 626, 627 and 631) were handed over to the Royal Norwegian Navy in 1942, manned by free Norwegian personnel and formed into the 30th MTB Flotilla under Lt. Ragnvald Tamber. After being worked up at HMS Bee shore base at Weymouth, they were based at Lerwick in the Shetland Islands, and deployed for numerous operations along the Norwegian coast. MTB 631 was captured by the Germans in March 1943 and replaced by MTB 653.

The last eight of the programme (boats nos. 633 to 640) were chosen for Mediterranean operations; they were worked up at HMS Bee at Weymouth before proceeding to Milford Haven, where they were formed into a new 32nd MTB Flotilla under the command of Lt. P. E. Stewart Gould; they were fitted with extra temporary fuel tanks bolted to the upper deck (raising their fuel capacity by 3,000 gallons to 8,000 gallons of 100 octane petrol for the long passage to the Mediterranean), and proceeded in groups to Gibraltar in March/April 1943.

Name	Ship Builder	Delivered	Fate
MGB 601	Tough Bros, Teddington Wharf, Manor Road, Teddington	9 March 1941	Sunk in action on 24 July 1942 in the Dover Strait.
MGB 602	Kris Cruisers (1934), Riverside Yard, Ferryll Road, Isleworth	August 1942	To Sea Cadet Corps in October 1945; sold 21 February 1956.
MGB 603	Tough Bros, Teddington Wharf, Manor Road, Teddington	25 July 1942	For disposal October 1945.
MGB 604	A. M. Dickie & Sons, Bangor, Gwynedd	24 July 1942	For disposal October 1945.
MGB 605	William Osbourne, Littlehampton	16 June 1942	Sunk 17 February 1945 in collision with a wreck off Ostend.
MGB 606	Wallasea Bay Yacht Station, Wallasea Bay, near Rochford	7 July 1942	Sunk in action on 3/4 November 1943 off the Dutch coast.
MGB 607	James A. Silver, Rosneath, Dunbartonshire	June 1942	For disposal October 1945.
MGB 608	James A. Silver, Rosneath, Dunbartonshire	August 1942	For disposal in January 1946.
MGB 609	William King, Burnham-on-Crouch	9 June 1942	To Sea Cadet Corps in October 1945; sold ca. 1952.
MGB 610	Woodnutt & Co., St Helens, Isle of Wight	30 June 1942	To Sea Cadet Corps at Falmouth in April 1946; to Weymouth August 1950; for disposal in January 1964.
MGB 611	Brooke Marine, Oulton Broad, Lowestoft	15 September 1942	Sold for disposal in 1946.
MGB 612	S. B. Hall, Galmpton, Brixham	10 July 1942	To Sea Cadet Corps in December 1945; for disposal in July 1948.
MGB 613	S. B. Hall, Galmpton, Brixham	9 September 1942	For disposal in October 1946.
MGB 614	Woodnutt & Co., St Helens, Isle of Wight	6 August 1942	For disposal in November 1945.
MGB 615	A. M. Dickie & Sons, Tarbert, Argyllshire	24 July 1942	For disposal October 1945.
MGB 616	William Osbourne, Littlehampton	19 August 1942	To Sea Cadet Corps at Exeter in 1947; for disposal in 1955.
MGB 617	William Osbourne, Littlehampton	8 October 1942	To Sea Scouts in 1946; sold 7 July 1953.
MGB 618	P. K. Harris & Sons, New Quay Dry Docks, Appledore, Torridge	27 June 1942	To Royal Norwegian Navy June 1942 to 1944; for disposal in January 1946.
MGB 619	Dorset Yacht Company, Lake Road, Hamworthy, Poole	23 August 1942	To Royal Norwegian Navy August 1942 to July 1944; for disposal in October 1945.
MGB 620	A. M. Dickie & Sons, Bangor, Gwynedd	6 September 1942	To Royal Norwegian Navy November 1942 to August 1943; for disposal in March 1946.
MGB 621	James A. Silver, Rosneath, Dunbartonshire	October 1942	To Sea Cadet Corps in April 1946, sold on 10 February 1955.
MGB 622	Brooke Marine, Oulton Broad, Lowestoft	10 November 1942	Sunk 10 March 1943 by German destroyers off Terschelling.
MGB 623	Wallasea Bay Yacht Station, Wallasea Bay, near Rochford	27 August 1942	To Royal Norwegian Navy 1942 to 1944; for disposal in May 1947.
MGB 624	Dorset Yacht Company, Lake Road, Hamworthy, Poole	19 October 1942	To Sea Cadet Corps at Aberystwyth in December 1945; for disposal in May 1964.
MGB 625	Alex Robertson (Yachtbuilders) & Sons, Sandbank, Argyllshire	4 September 1942	To Royal Norwegian Navy 1942; lost 1944 in Scottish waters.
MGB 626	Tough Bros, Teddington Wharf, Manor Road, Teddington	24 July 1941	To Royal Norwegian Navy in June 1942; lost 22 November 1943 by explosion off Lerwick.
MGB 627	P. K. Harris & Sons, New Quay Dry Docks, Appledore, Torridge	7 October 1942	To Royal Norwegian Navy September 1942 to 1944; for disposal in April 1945.
MGB 628	J. W. & A. Upham, Brixham, Devon	November 1942	For disposal in October 1945.
MGB 629	A. M. Dickie & Sons, Tarbert, Argyllshire	1 December 1942	For disposal in October 1945.
MGB 630	Alex Robertson (Yachtbuilders) & Sons, Sandbank, Argyllshire	5 November 1942	To Sea Cadet Corps 1945; sold by 1949.
MGB 631	William King, Burnham-on-Crouch	August 1942	To Royal Norwegian Navy in 1942; stranded 14 March 1943 on Norwegian coast and captured by Germans.
MGB 632	Kris Cruisers (1934), Riverside Yard, Ferryll Road, Isleworth	December 1942	For disposal in October 1945.
MGB 633	Dorset Yacht Company, Lake Road, Hamworthy, Poole	23 November 1942	Lost on 30 January 1946 on passage from Malta to Alexandria.
MGB 634	William Osbourne, Littlehampton	27 November 1942	Lost on 30 January 1946 on passage from Malta to Alexandria.
MGB 635	Boat Construction Co., Falmouth	November 1942	Damaged in 1944 and reported in July 1945 as sunk as target off Malta.
MGB 636	James A. Silver, Rosneath, Dunbartonshire	January 1943	Sunk in error by MGB 658 in action off Elba.
MGB 637	Alex Robertson (Yachtbuilders) & Sons, Sandbank, Argyllshire	January 1943	Lost on 30 January 1946 on passage from Malta to Alexandria.
MGB 638	A. M. Dickie & Sons, Bangor, Gwynedd	14 December 1942	Lost on 30 January 1946 on passage from Malta to Alexandria.
MGB 639	Brooke Marine, Oulton Broad, Lowestoft	9 March 1943	Sunk 28 April 1943 by Italian torpedo boat Sagittario off Pantellaria.
MGB 640	Wallasea Bay Yacht Station, Wallasea Bay, near Rochford	1 November 1942	Sunk by mines 26/27 June 1944 off Vada, Italy.

=== 1941 Supplemental Programme ===
A further 60 boats were ordered in November 1941, numbered from 641 up to 700, of which 16 ordered on 18 November had the prefix of "MGB" (numbers 641 to 648, 657 to 663, and 674), and 44 ordered on 28 November originally had the prefix of "ML" (numbers 649 to 656, 664 to 673, and 675 to 700), although the MLs were quickly reclassed as MGBs. All of these (except early losses) were reclassed as "MTB" in September 1943. However, from No. 697 onwards, the boats were classified as combined "MTB"/"MGB"s.

As with the final eight boats of the preceding programme, 24 boats were chosen for Mediterranean operations; they were worked up at HMS Bee at Weymouth before proceeding to Milford Haven, where they were formed into three new flotillas as follows (with initial flotilla commanders in parentheses):

- 19th MGB Flotilla (under Lt E.M. ("Mickey") Thorpe): boats nos. 641 to 648 inclusive.
- 33rd MTB Flotilla (under Lt-Cmdr Ronald R. W. Ashby): boats nos. 649, 651, 654, 655, 656, 665, 667 and 670.
- 20th MGB Flotilla (under Lt-Cmdr Norman H. Hughes): boats nos. 657 to 663 inclusive, plus 674 (although 674 only joined later).

As before, they were fitted with extra temporary fuel tanks bolted to the upper deck (raising their fuel capacity by 3,000 gallons to 8,000 gallons of 100 octane petrol for the long passage to the Mediterranean), and proceeded in groups to Gibraltar in March/April 1943.

Motor Gun Boats
Name	Ship builder	Delivered	Fate
MGB 641	Thomson & Balfour, Victoria Saw Mills, Bo'ness	29 December 1942	Sunk in action on 14/15 July 1943 by shore batteries in the Strait of Messina.
MGB 642	P. K. Harris & Sons, New Quay Dry Docks, Appledore, Torridge	7 March 1943	Lost on 30 January 1946 on passage from Malta to Alexandria.
MGB 643	Woodnutt & Co., St Helens, Isle of Wight	22 December 1942	Lost on 30 January 1946 on passage from Malta to Alexandria.
MGB 644	Tough Bros, Teddington Wharf, Manor Road, Teddington	December 1942	Mined 26 June 1943 off Sicily and scuttled.
MGB 645	S. B. Hall, Galmpton, Brixham	December 1942	For disposal in August 1945.
MGB 646	Risdon Beazley, Clausentum Yard, Northam Bridge, Southampton	19 November 1942	For disposal in August 1945.
MGB 647	A. M. Dickie & Sons, Bangor, Gwynedd	24 February 1943	Scuttled in September 1946 off Malta.
MGB 648	Dorset Yacht Company, Lake Road, Hamworthy, Poole	10 January 1943	Bombed 14 June 1943 in Central Mediterranean.
MGB 649	Risdon Beazley, Clausentum Yard, Northam Bridge, Southampton	7 January 1943	For disposal in September 1945 in the Mediterranean.
MGB 650	Boat Construction Co., Falmouth	January 1943	To Royal Air Force in 1945 as Long Range Rescue Craft LRRC 020.
MGB 651	Tough Bros, Teddington Wharf, Manor Road, Teddington	January 1943	For disposal in September 1945 in the Mediterranean.
MGB 652	S. B. Hall, Galmpton, Brixham	25 January 1943	For disposal in October 1945 in the Mediterranean.
MGB 653	Alex Robertson (Yachtbuilders) & Sons, Sandbank, Argyllshire	March 1943	To Royal Norwegian Navy 1943 to 1944; for disposal in December 1945.
MGB 654	Lady Bee, Shoreham-by-Sea, Sussex	19 February 1943	Damaged 1944 and for disposal in January 1945.
MGB 655	William Osbourne, Littlehampton	January 1943	Mined on 22 March 1945 in the Mediterranean.
MGB 656	Wallasea Bay Yacht Station, Wallasea Bay, near Rochford	24 December 1942	For disposal in September 1945 in the Mediterranean.
MGB 657	Woodnutt & Co., St Helens, Isle of Wight	9 February 1943	Constructive total loss by mine 11/12 September 1943 in the Mediterranean; broken up in December 1944.
MGB 658	J. W. & A. Upham, Brixham, Devon	April 1943	Lost on 30 January 1946 on passage from Malta to Alexandria.
MGB 659	Boat Construction Co., Falmouth	May 1943	Lost on 30 January 1946 on passage from Malta to Alexandria.
MGB 660	Brooke Marine, Oulton Broad, Lowestoft	21 April 1943	For disposal in February 1946.
MGB 661	Alex Robertson (Yachtbuilders) & Sons, Sandbank, Argyllshire	May 1943	For disposal in June 1946.
MGB 662	Dorset Yacht Company, Lake Road, Hamworthy, Poole	8 April 1943	For disposal in February 1946.
MGB 663	William Osbourne, Littlehampton	8 March 1943	Mined on 10 October 1944 in the Adriatic.
MGB 674 ^{(a)}	Tough Bros, Teddington Wharf, Manor Road, Teddington	6 May 1943	For disposal in June 1946.

Note: (a) 674 was the final boat ordered as a MGB, and is thus shown out of numerical sequence.

Name	Ship builder	Delivered	Fate
MTB 664	A. M. Dickie & Sons, Tarbert, Argyllshire	1 April 1943	To Royal Air Force in 1944 as Long Range Rescue Craft, renumbered LRRC 021 in 1945.
MTB 665	P. K. Harris & Sons, New Quay Dry Docks, Appledore, Torridge	5 May 1943	Sunk in action on 15 August 1943 by shore batteries in the Strait of Messina.
MTB 666	Dorset Yacht Company, Lake Road, Hamworthy, Poole	10 June 1943	Sunk in action off Ijmuiden on 4/5 July 1944.
MTB 667	William King, Burnham-on-Crouch	28 December 1942	For disposal in September 1945 to July 1946 in the Mediterranean.
MTB 668	Thomson & Balfour, Victoria Saw Mills, Bo'ness	26 March 1943	To Sea Cadet Corps in December 1945.
MTB 669	Lady Bee, Shoreham-by-Sea, Sussex	29 April 1943	Sunk 26 October 1943 in action off Norway.
MTB 670	Wallasea Bay Yacht Station, Wallasea Bay, near Rochford	7 March 1943	Lost on 30 January 1946 on passage from Malta to Alexandria.
MTB 671	A. M. Dickie & Sons, Bangor, Gwynedd	16 May 1943	Sunk in action on 24 April 1944 off Cape Barfleur.
MTB 672	James A. Silver, Rosneath, Dunbartonshire	April 1943	For disposal in October 1945.
MTB 673	Tough Bros, Teddington Wharf, Manor Road, Teddington	June 1943	To Royal Air Force in 1945 as Long Range Rescue Craft LRRC 022.
MTB 675	Alex Robertson (Yachtbuilders) & Sons, Sandbank, Argyllshire	July 1943	To Royal Air Force in May 1945 as Long Range Rescue Craft LRRC 023.
MTB 676	Risdon Beazley, Clausentum Yard, Northam Bridge, Southampton	13 May 1943	To Royal Air Force in June 1945 as Long Range Rescue Craft LRRC 024.
MTB 677	S. B. Hall, Galmpton, Brixham	May 1943	To Royal Air Force in June 1945 as Long Range Rescue Craft LRRC 025.
MTB 678	Boat Construction Co., Falmouth	July 1943	To Royal Air Force in June 1945 as Long Range Rescue Craft LRRC 026.
MTB 679	A. M. Dickie & Sons, Bangor, Gwynedd	July 1943	To Royal Air Force in June 1945 as Long Range Rescue Craft LRRC 027.
MTB 680	Risdon Beazley, Clausentum Yard, Northam Bridge, Southampton	April 1943	To Royal Air Force in June 1945 as Long Range Rescue Craft LRRC 028.
MTB 681	Brooke Marine, Oulton Broad, Lowestoft	20 July 1943	Sunk in action on 10 June 1944 off the Dutch coast.
MTB 682	Wallasea Bay Yacht Station, Wallasea Bay, near Rochford	May 1943	To Royal Air Force in 1945 as Long Range Rescue Craft LRRC 029.
MTB 683	James A. Silver, Rosneath, Dunbartonshire	July 1943	To Royal Air Force in May 1945 as Long Range Rescue Craft LRRC 030.
MTB 684	Woodnutt & Co., St Helens, Isle of Wight	28 April 1943	To Royal Air Force in 1945 as Long Range Rescue Craft LRRC 031.
MTB 685	Dorset Yacht Company, Lake Road, Hamworthy, Poole	July 1943	For disposal in April 1949.
MTB 686	William Osbourne, Littlehampton	9 June 1943	Lost on 22 November 1943 by fire at Lerwick.
MTB 687	P. K. Harris & Sons, New Quay Dry Docks, Appledore, Torridge	31 July 1943	Paid off on 24 October 1944 for transfer to Royal Air Force as Long Range Rescue Craft LRRC 032.
MTB 688	A. M. Dickie & Sons, Tarbert, Argyllshire	July 1943	To Royal Norwegian Navy from August 1943 to 1944; to Royal Air Force in 1945 as Long Range Rescue Craft LRRC 034.
MTB 689	S. B. Hall, Galmpton, Brixham	July 1943	To Royal Air Force in June 1945 as Long Range Rescue Craft LRRC 033.
MTB 690	Boat Construction Co., Falmouth	15 September 1943	Lost 18 January 1945 in collision with a wreck in the North Sea.
MTB 691	Alex Robertson (Yachtbuilders) & Sons, Sandbank, Argyllshire	August 1943	To Royal Air Force in May 1945 as Long Range Rescue Craft LRRC 035.
MTB 692	Lady Bee, Shoreham-by-Sea, Sussex	July 1943	To Royal Air Force in 1945 as Long Range Rescue Craft LRRC 036.
MTB 693	William King, Burnham-on-Crouch	May 1943	To Royal Air Force in May 1945 as Long Range Rescue Craft LRRC 037.
MTB 694	Thomson & Balfour, Victoria Saw Mills, Bo'ness	26 July 1943	To Royal Air Force in May 1945 as Long Range Rescue Craft LRRC 038.
MTB 695	Brooke Marine, Oulton Broad, Lowestoft	30 October 1943	To Royal Air Force in 1945 as Long Range Rescue Craft LRRC 039.
MTB 696	Kris Cruisers (1934), Riverside Yard, Ferryll Road, Isleworth	15 April 1943	For disposal in October 1945.
MTB 697	Woodnutt & Co., St Helens, Isle of Wight	July 1943	Mined on 18 April 1945 in the Adriatic.
MTB 698	Wallasea Bay Yacht Station, Wallasea Bay, near Rochford	July 1943	Lost on 30 January 1946 on passage from Malta to Alexandria.
MTB 699	Dorset Yacht Company, Lake Road, Hamworthy, Poole	October 1943	For disposal October 1945 to July 1946 in the Mediterranean.
MTB 700	William Osbourne, Littlehampton	July 1943	Lost on 30 January 1946 on passage from Malta to Alexandria.

=== 1942 Original Programme ===
Another 23 boats were ordered on 7 April 1942 as MTB 701 to MTB 723.

Motor Torpedo Boats
Name	Ship builder	Delivered	Fate
MTB 701	J. W. & A. Upham, Brixham, Devon	October 1943	To Sea Cadet Corps at Bideford in 1946.
MTB 702	P. K. Harris & Sons, New Quay Dry Docks, Appledore, Torridge	31 October 1943	To Ship Target Trials in 1946.
MTB 703	Tough Bros, Teddington Wharf, Manor Road, Teddington	8 October 1943	For disposal in September 1945 to July 1946 in the Mediterranean.
MTB 704	William Osbourne, Littlehampton	November 1943	To Royal Norwegian Navy in December 1944; for disposal in 1946.
MTB 705	Risdon Beazley, Clausentum Yard, Northam Bridge, Southampton	7 August 1943	Mined on 23 March 1945 in the Adriatic.
MTB 706	Risdon Beazley, Clausentum Yard, Northam Bridge, Southampton	October 1943	For disposal in September 1945 to July 1946 in the Mediterranean.
MTB 707	Boat Construction Co., Falmouth	November 1943	Lost 18 April 1944 in collision with L'Escarmouche to north of Ireland.
MTB 708	S. B. Hall, Galmpton, Brixham	November 1943	Scuttled on 5 May 1944 after being bombed in error by Allied aircraft in the Channel.
MTB 709	A. M. Dickie & Sons, Tarbert, Argyllshire	February 1944	To Royal Norwegian Navy 1944 to 1945; for disposal in January 1947.
MTB 710	William Osbourne, Littlehampton	18 September 1943	Mined on 10 April 1945 in the Adriatic.
MTB 711	Brooke Marine, Oulton Broad, Lowestoft	2 April 1944	To Royal Norwegian Navy 1944 to 1946 as Hauk; for disposal in 1947.
MTB 712	Wallasea Bay Yacht Station, Wallasea Bay, near Rochford	10 February 1944	To Royal Norwegian Navy 1944 to July 1945; constructive total loss by grounding in Scottish waters 25 January 1945; for disposal in July 1945.
MTB 713	Dorset Yacht Company, Lake Road, Hamworthy, Poole	10 December 1943	To Royal Norwegian Navy 1944; sold in Norway in 1946.
MTB 714	A. M. Dickie & Sons, Bangor, Gwynedd	October 1943	To Sea Cadet Corps in April 1946; sold 18 November 1955.
MTB 715	Woodnutt & Co., St Helens, Isle of Wight	9 December 1943	To Royal Norwegian Navy 1944; lost on 19 May 1`945 by explosion at Fosnavaag, Norway.
MTB 716	James A. Silver, Rosneath, Dunbartonshire	April 1944	To Royal Norwegian Navy 1944; sold in Norway in 1946.
MTB 717	A. M. Dickie & Sons, Bangor, Gwynedd	1 February 1944	To Royal Norwegian Navy 1944; sold in Norway in 1946.
MTB 718	Alex Robertson (Yachtbuilders) & Sons, Sandbank, Argyllshire	March 1944	To Sea Cadet Corps on the Tyne in 1946.
MTB 719	Lady Bee, Shoreham-by-Sea, Sussex	February 1944	To Royal Norwegian Navy 1944; sold in Norway in 1946.
MTB 720	William King, Burnham-on-Crouch	November 1943	To Royal Norwegian Navy 1944; sold in Norway in 1946.
MTB 721	Cardnell Brothers, Maylandsea, Althorne, near Chelmsford	15 October 1943	To Royal Norwegian Navy 1944; sold in Norway in 1946.
MTB 722	Thomson & Balfour, Victoria Saw Mills, Bo'ness	March 1944	To Royal Norwegian Navy 1944; sold in Norway in 1946.
MTB 723	P. K. Harris & Sons, New Quay Dry Docks, Appledore, Torridge	27 April 1944	To Royal Norwegian Navy 1944; sold in Norway in 1946.

=== 1942 Supplemental Programme ===
Another 48 boats were ordered on 30 August 1942 as MTB 724 to MTB 771.

Name	Ship Builder	Delivered	Fate
MTB 724	Wallasea Bay Yacht Station, Wallasea Bay, near Rochford	7 September 1943	To Sea Cadet Corps at Norwich in December 1945; sold 24 July 1954.
MTB 725	Boat Construction Co., Falmouth	March 1944	To Sea Cadet Corps at Pwllheli in October 1945; sold 12 September 1951.
MTB 726	A. M. Dickie & Sons, Bangor, Gwynedd	2 March 1944	To Royal Canadian Navy from March 1944 to May 1945; to Sea Cadet Corps at Wisbech in July 1946; sold by 1950.
MTB 727	S. B. Hall, Galmpton, Brixham	27 February 1944	To Royal Canadian Navy from February 1944 to June 1945; to Sea Cadet Corps at Twickenham in 1946; sold 20 December 1951.
MTB 728	William Osbourne, Littlehampton	21 December 1943	To Sea Cadet Corps at Cardigan in 1946; sold 1948.
MTB 729	Brooke Marine, Oulton Broad, Lowestoft	July 1944	Sold on 21 September 1947.
MTB 730	Woodnutt & Co., St Helens, Isle of Wight	28 April 1944	To Sea Cadet Corps in April 1946; sold 27 May 1958.
MTB 731	Alex Robertson (Yachtbuilders) & Sons, Sandbank, Argyllshire	July 1944	Became MTB 3001 in 1949, then MASB 3001 in 1953; to Sea Cadet Corps at Birkenhead in October 1957.
MTB 732	Dorset Yacht Company, Lake Road, Hamworthy, Poole	17 April 1944	Sunk in error on 28 May 1944 by La Combattante in action in the Channel.
MTB 733	Lady Bee, Shoreham-by-Sea, Sussex	8 June 1944	To Sea Cadet Corps at Plymouth in March 1946.
MTB 734	Thomson & Balfour, Victoria Saw Mills, Bo'ness	30 May 1944	Bombed in error on 26 June 1944 by Allied aircraft off Normandy and scuttled.
MTB 735	Tough Bros, Teddington Wharf, Manor Road, Teddington	26 February 1944	To Royal Canadian Navy from February 1944 to May 1944; to Sea Cadet Corps at Ellesmere in January 1946; sold 14 June 1956.
MTB 736	Tough Bros, Teddington Wharf, Manor Road, Teddington	April 1944	To Royal Canadian Navy from April 1944 to May 1944; to Sea Cadet Corps at Fraserburgh in July 1946.
MTB 737	J, S. Doig (Grimsby), Grimsby Docks	May 1944	Lent to Brighton Nautical Training College in 1945.
MTB 738	Risdon Beazley, Clausentum Yard, Northam Bridge, Southampton	15 December 1943	To Sea Cadet Corps at Ipswich in January 1946; sold 25 April 1958.
MTB 739	Herbert Woods, Broads Haven, Potter Heigham, Great Yarmouth	27 April 1944	Became MTB 3039 in 1949; for disposal in April 1952.
MTB 740	Collins Pleasurecraft Co., Oulton Broad, near Lowestoft	8 August 1944	To Sea Cadet Corps at Norwich in 1946.
MTB 741	A. M. Dickie & Sons, Tarbert, Argyllshire	July 1944	To Sea Cadet Corps at Goole in 1946; sold 26 November 1957.
MTB 742	John Sadd & Sons, Maldon, Essex	April 1944	To Sea Cadet Corps at Parkeston in February 1946.
MTB 743	Aldous Successors, Brightlingsea, Essex	13 April 1944	To Royal Canadian Navy from March 1944 to May 1944; lent to Sea Scouts in 1946; sold 23 January 1957.
MTB 744	Risdon Beazley, Clausentum Yard, Northam Bridge, Southampton	March 1944	To Royal Canadian Navy from March 1944 to May 1944; to Royal Air Force in 1945 as Long Range Rescue Craft LRRC 040.
MTB 745	Austins of East Ham, London E.6	29 January 1944	To Royal Canadian Navy from January 1944 to May 1944; to Ship Target Trials 1946; for disposal in 1946.
MTB 746	James A. Silver, Rosneath, Dunbartonshire	19 May 1944	To Royal Canadian Navy from May 1944 to May 1945; to Sea Cadet Corps at Gloucester in December 1946; sold 1953.
MTB 747	Sussex Shipbuilding Co., Shoreham-by-Sea	June 1944	To Sea Cadet Corps in March 1946; sold 19 February 1958.
MTB 748	William Osbourne, Littlehampton	19 February 1944	To Royal Canadian Navy from February 1944 to May 1945; to Sea Cadet Corps at Barnes in March 1945; sold 20 May 1955.
MTB 749	William Osbourne, Littlehampton	4 April 1944	To Ship Target Trials in 1946.
MTB 750	A. M. Dickie & Sons, Bangor, Gwynedd	May 1944	Became MTB 3002 in 1949, then MASB 3002 in 1953; to Sea Cadet Corps in 1956; sold 1967.
MTB 751	Wallasea Bay Yacht Station, Wallasea Bay, near Rochford	25 May 1944	To Sea Cadet Corps at Poplar in October 1945; sold 23 January 1957.
MTB 752	Dorset Yacht Company, Lake Road, Hamworthy, Poole	June 1944	To Sea Cadet Corps in October 1945.
MTB 753	Boat Construction Co., Falmouth	July 1944	To Sea Cadet Corps at Bermondsey in November 1945; sold 22 October 1956.
MTB 754	Solent Shipyards, Bursledon Bridge, Sarisbury Green, Hants	December 1944	To Sea Cadet Corps at Connah's Quay in May 1946; sold 17 September 1954.
MTB 755	J. W. & A. Upham, Brixham, Devon	September 1943	To Sea Cadet Corps at Scarborough; sold 13 October 1955.
MTB 756	Herbert Woods, Broads Haven, Potter Heigham, Great Yarmouth	31 July 1944	To Sea Cadet Corps at Kingston-upon-Hull in January 1946; sold 8 November 1954.
MTB 757	P. K. Harris & Sons, New Quay Dry Docks, Appledore, Torridge	29 June 1944	To Sea Cadet Corps at Worcester in January 1946; sold 25 January 1952.
MTB 758	Alex Robertson (Yachtbuilders) & Sons, Sandbank, Argyllshire	October 1944	Became MTB 5031 in 1949, then sold 14 June 1956.
MTB 759	Woodnutt & Co., St Helens, Isle of Wight	July 1944	To Sea Cadet Corps at Barnstaple in April 1946; sold 25 November 1954.
MTB 760	S. B. Hall, Galmpton, Brixham	September 1944	To Sea Cadet Corps at Bristol in April 1946; sold 18 September 1958.
MTB 761	Aldous Successors, Brightlingsea, Essex	9 August 1944	To Sea Cadet Corps at Chelmsford in January 1946; sold 25 March 1963.
MTB 762	Brooke Marine, Oulton Broad, Lowestoft	6 October 1944	For disposal in October 1945.
MTB 763	Cardnell Brothers, Maylandsea, Althorne, near Chelmsford	June 1944	To Sea Cadet Corps at Stockton-on-Tees in January 1946; sold 17 May 1956.
MTB 764	James A. Silver, Rosneath, Dunbartonshire	September 1944	For disposal in May 1946.
MTB 765	H. T. Percival, Yacht Station, Horning, Suffolk	30 October 1944	To Sea Cadet Corps at Sunbury-on-Thames in December 1945; sold 22 February 1955.
MTB 766	Wallasea Bay Yacht Station, Wallasea Bay, near Rochford	10 August 1944	To Sea Cadet Corps at Clydebank in 1946; sold 10 February 1955.
MTB 767	Boat Construction Co., Falmouth	19 December 1944	For disposal in January 1947.
MTB 768	Thomson & Balfour, Victoria Saw Mills, Bo'ness	26 August 1944	To Sea Cadet Corps at Newark in December 1945; sold 30 November 1955.
MTB 769	William King, Burnham-on-Crouch	June 1944	To Sea Cadet Corps at Fareham in 1946; sold 24 April 1956.
MTB 770	Leo A. Robinson, Oulton Broad, near Lowestoft	11 December 1944	To Sea Cadet Corps at Cleethorpes in April 1946; sold 26 November 1957.
MTB 771	A. M. Dickie & Sons, Bangor, Gwynedd	5 August 1944	To Sea Cadet Corps at Southend-on-Sea in 1946; sold 25 November 1954.

==== 1943 Programme ====
Finally, 58 more were ordered on 26 March 1943 as MTB 772 to MTB 800, and MTB 5001 to MTB 5029 (although MTB 5027 was cancelled, the only Fairmile order not to be built).

Name	Ship Builder	Delivered	Fate
MTB 772	Risdon Beazley, Clausentum Yard, Northam Bridge, Southampton	12 July 1944	To Sea Cadet Corps at Chelsea in January 1946; sold 29 April 1955.
MTB 773	Austins of East Ham, London E.6	29 June 1944	To Ship Target Trials 1946; for disposal in October 1947.
MTB 774	Sussex Shipbuilding Co., Shoreham-by-Sea	November 1944	Sold 1948.
MTB 775	S. B. Hall, Galmpton, Brixham	August 1944	To Sea Cadet Corps in December 1945; sold 17 September 1954.
MTB 776	Lady Bee, Shoreham-by-Sea, Sussex	August 1944	Lost by fire and explosion on 14 February 1945 at Ostend.
MTB 777	A. M. Dickie & Sons, Bangor, Gwynedd	21 October 1944	To Sea Cadet Corps at Peterborough in 1946; sold 15 November 1951.
MTB 778	Dorset Yacht Company, Lake Road, Hamworthy, Poole	November 1944	To Sea Cadet Corps at Purfleet in 1946; sold 25 July 1955.
MTB 779	Woodnutt & Co., St Helens, Isle of Wight	16 October 1944	Became MTB 5032 in 1949; sold 16 January 1955.
MTB 780	Kris Cruisers (1934), Riverside Yard, Ferryll Road, Isleworth	11 January 1945	Became MTB 5001 in 1949; sold 16 January 23 October 1957.
MTB 781	J, S. Doig (Grimsby), Grimsby Docks	November 1944	To Sea Cadet Corps at Penarth in April 1946; sold 22 July 1952.
MTB 782	Wallasea Bay Yacht Station, Wallasea Bay, near Rochford	25 October 1944	Mined 29 Decewmber 1944 off the Schelde
MTB 783	Cardnell Brothers, Maylandsea, Althorne, near Chelmsford	July 1945	Sold 1947.
MTB 784	Tough Bros, Teddington Wharf, Manor Road, Teddington	29 September 1944	Sold 7 January 1948.
MTB 785	Brooke Marine, Oulton Broad, Lowestoft	13 March 1945	Became MTB 5033 in 1949; sold 17 October 1955.
MTB 786	Solent Shipyards, Bursledon Bridge, Sarisbury Green, Hants	12 July 1945	Sold 1949.
MTB 787	William Osbourne, Littlehampton	June 1944	Became MTB 5034 in 1949; sold 17 June 1949.
MTB 788	P. K. Harris & Sons, New Quay Dry Docks, Appledore, Torridge	17 February 1945	Lent to Sea Scouts in 1946; sold 18 June 1955.
MTB 789	Risdon Beazley, Clausentum Yard, Northam Bridge, Southampton	17 October 1944	Lost by fire and explosion on 14 February 1945 at Ostend.
MTB 790	Boat Construction Co., Falmouth	July 1945	Became MTB 5003 (2nd of that number) in 1949; sold 25 November 1953.
MTB 791	Thomson & Balfour, Victoria Saw Mills, Bo'ness	4 November 1944	Lost by fire and explosion on 14 February 1945 at Ostend.
MTB 792	Tough Bros, Teddington Wharf, Manor Road, Teddington	1 March 1945	Sold 7 January 1948.
MTB 793	Alex Robertson (Yachtbuilders) & Sons, Sandbank, Argyllshire	5 March 1945	Became MTB 5035 in 1949, then sold 25 April 1958.
MTB 794	Herbert Woods, Broads Haven, Potter Heigham, Great Yarmouth	22 December 1944	Became MTB 5036 in 1949, then sold 24 April 1958.
MTB 795	William Osbourne, Littlehampton	August 1944	Became MTB 5037 in 1949; for disposal in 1952.
MTB 796	John Sadd & Sons, Maldon, Essex	31 October 1944	Lent to Sea Scouts in 1946; sold July 1954.
MTB 797	A. M. Dickie & Sons, Tarbert, Argyllshire	January 1945	To Royal Canadian Navy from December 1944 to May 1945; for disposal in 1947.
MTB 798	Austins of East Ham, London E.6	16 October 1944	Lost by fire and explosion on 14 February 1945 at Ostend.
MTB 799	H. T. Percival, Yacht Station, Horning, Suffolk	June 1945	To Royal Air Force in July 1945 as Long Range Rescue Craft LRRC 001.
MTB 800	Dorset Yacht Company, Lake Road, Hamworthy, Poole	July 1945	To Royal Air Force in July 1945 as Long Range Rescue Craft LRRC 002.
MTB 5001	Woodnutt & Co., St Helens, Isle of Wight	18 December 1944	Sunk 6/7 April 1945 in action in the North Sea.
MTB 5002	Wallasea Bay Yacht Station, Wallasea Bay, near Rochford	December 1944	Sold 1957.
MTB 5003	James A. Silver, Rosneath, Dunbartonshire	July 1945	Sold on 8 March 1948.
MTB 5004	James A. Silver, Rosneath, Dunbartonshire	September 1945	To Royal Air Force in September 1945 as Long Range Rescue Craft LRRC 003; to Sea Cadet Corps at Sittingbourne in 1949; sold June 1956.
MTB 5005	William Osbourne, Littlehampton	7 November 1944	Sold 28 February 1952.
MTB 5006	Boat Construction Co., Falmouth	August 1945	To Royal Air Force in August 1945 as Long Range Rescue Craft LRRC 004.
MTB 5007	S. B. Hall, Galmpton, Brixham	March 1945	Sold 17 November 1950.
MTB 5008	William King, Burnham-on-Crouch	June 1945	Sold 20 July 1956.
MTB 5009	Lady Bee, Shoreham-by-Sea, Sussex	5 April 1945	Sold 17 March 1956.
MTB 5010	A. M. Dickie & Sons, Bangor, Gwynedd	January 1945	Became MTB 3050 in 1949, then MASB 3050 in 1953; sold 20 July 1955.
MTB 5011	Thomson & Balfour, Victoria Saw Mills, Bo'ness	28 March 1945	To Royal Air Force in March 1945 as Long Range Rescue Craft LRRC 005.
MTB 5012	Austins of East Ham, London E.6	March 1945	To Royal Air Force in March 1945 as Long Range Rescue Craft LRRC 006.
MTB 5013	Risdon Beazley, Clausentum Yard, Northam Bridge, Southampton	March 1945	Became MTB 3053 in 1949, then MASB 3053 in 1953; to Sea Cadet Corps in 1957; sold March 1969.
MTB 5014	Woodnutt & Co., St Helens, Isle of Wight	March 1945	To Royal Air Force in March 1945 as Long Range Rescue Craft LRRC 007.
MTB 5015	Cardnell Brothers, Maylandsea, Althorne, near Chelmsford	March 1945	Sold 23 October 1957.
MTB 5016	Wallasea Bay Yacht Station, Wallasea Bay, near Rochford	March 1945	To Royal Air Force in March 1945 as Long Range Rescue Craft LRRC 008.
MTB 5017	A. M. Dickie & Sons, Tarbert, Argyllshire	July 1945	To Royal Air Force in July 1945 as Long Range Rescue Craft LRRC 009.
MTB 5018	Alex Robertson (Yachtbuilders) & Sons, Sandbank, Argyllshire	July 1945	To Royal Air Force in July 1945 as Long Range Rescue Craft LRRC 010.
MTB 5019	Risdon Beazley, Clausentum Yard, Northam Bridge, Southampton	13 April 1945	To Royal Air Force in April 1945 as Long Range Rescue Craft LRRC 011.
MTB 5020	John Sadd & Sons, Maldon, Essex	December 1944	For disposal in December 1956; sold 18 September 1958.
MTB 5021	P. K. Harris & Sons, New Quay Dry Docks, Appledore, Torridge	9 July 1945	To Royal Air Force in July 1945 as Long Range Rescue Craft LRRC 012.
MTB 5022	Tough Bros, Teddington Wharf, Manor Road, Teddington	19 April 1945	To Royal Air Force in April 1945 as Long Range Rescue Craft LRRC 013.
MTB 5023	S. B. Hall, Galmpton, Brixham	14 July 1945	To Royal Air Force in July 1945 as Long Range Rescue Craft LRRC 014; to Sea Cadet Corps in 1948; sold 18 September 1958.
MTB 5024	A. M. Dickie & Sons, Bangor, Gwynedd	5 May 1945	To Royal Air Force in May 1945 as Long Range Rescue Craft LRRC 015.
MTB 5025	Wallasea Bay Yacht Station, Wallasea Bay, near Rochford	August 1945	To Royal Air Force in August 1945 as Long Range Rescue Craft LRRC 016.
MTB 5026	John Sadd & Sons, Maldon, Essex	17 March 1945	To Royal Air Force in March 1945 as Long Range Rescue Craft LRRC 017.
MTB 5027	Risdon Beazley, Clausentum Yard, Northam Bridge, Southampton	not built	Cancelled in December 1944.
MTB 5028	Woodnutt & Co., St Helens, Isle of Wight	May 1945	To Royal Air Force in May 1945 as Long Range Rescue Craft LRRC 018.
MTB 5029	Thomson & Balfour, Victoria Saw Mills, Bo'ness	12 July 1945	To Royal Air Force in July 1945 as Long Range Rescue Craft LRRC 019.

== History ==
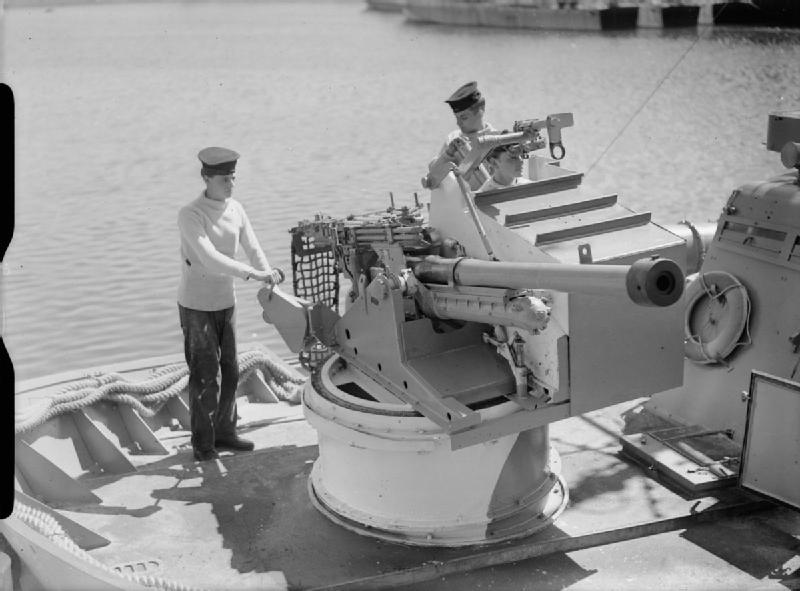
6-pounder (57 mm) guns with Molins autoloader were mounted on some of the D-class MTBs

.

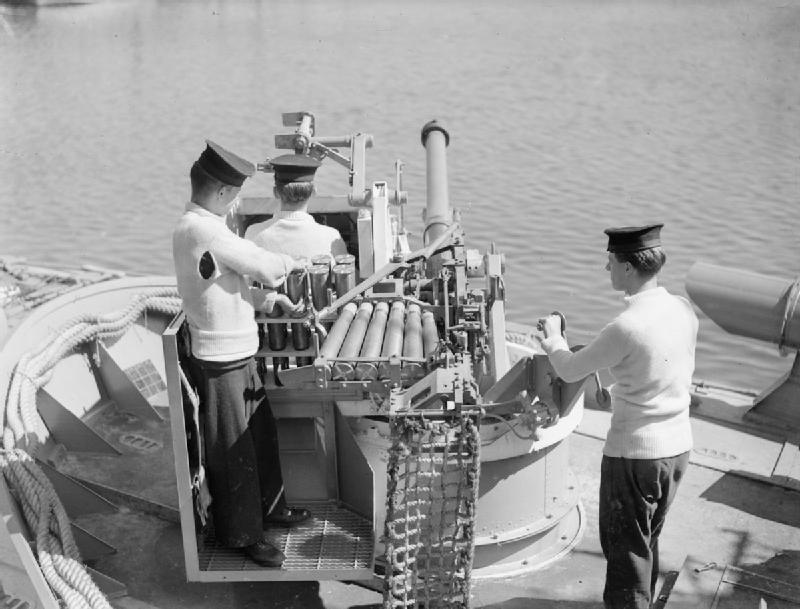
Back view of the same gun

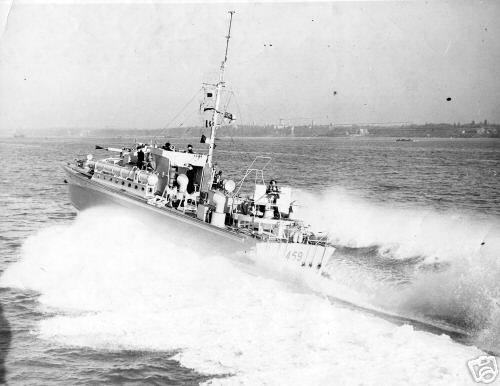
MTB 459 at speed, 1944

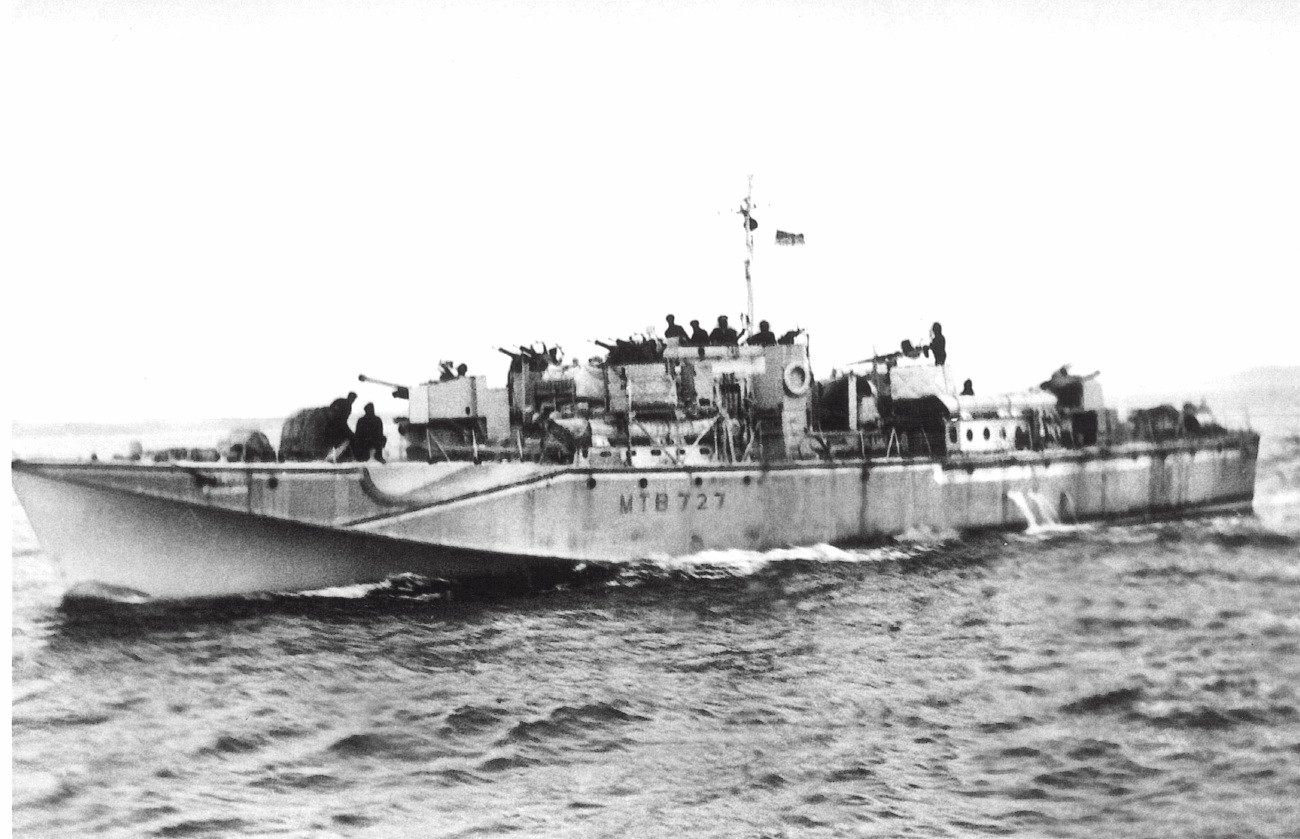
MTB 727, 1944

Unlike the Fairmile B designs (many of which were built overseas), the "Dog Boats" were only produced in component form in Britain. Some were built for the RAF Marine Branch for use in the long range air-sea rescue role for downed airmen. Altogether, 229 boats were ordered (and 228 built) between 1942 and 1945.

Many versions were produced or converted from existing boats; MGB, MTB, MA/SB, LRRC and post-war FPB.

Since the Fairmile D could be fitted out with a mix of armament that gave it the capabilities of both a motor gunboat and a motor torpedo boat, later-war examples were all completed with a heavy combined armament and universally classified as MTBs. By 1944, the MGB designation was largely dropped by the RN and most of the mid-war (earlier model) Type Ds which had survived were reclassified as MTBs even if they lacked torpedo armament. Mediterranean-based MGBs, however, seem to have retained their MGB pennant numbers to the end of the war.

Two captured boats were put into Kriegsmarine service.

Today the D-type is a popular choice among boat modelers.

There are no known survivors, other than two abandoned wrecks, one in Chatham, England and the other in Ellingsøy, Norway.

== See also ==
- Fairmile A motor launch
- Fairmile B motor launch
- Fairmile C motor gun boat
- Fairmile H landing craft
- Steam gun boat
- Coastal Forces of the Royal Navy
