= Ordnance QF 6-pounder =

British anti-tank gun

Ordnance QF 6-pounder 7 cwt
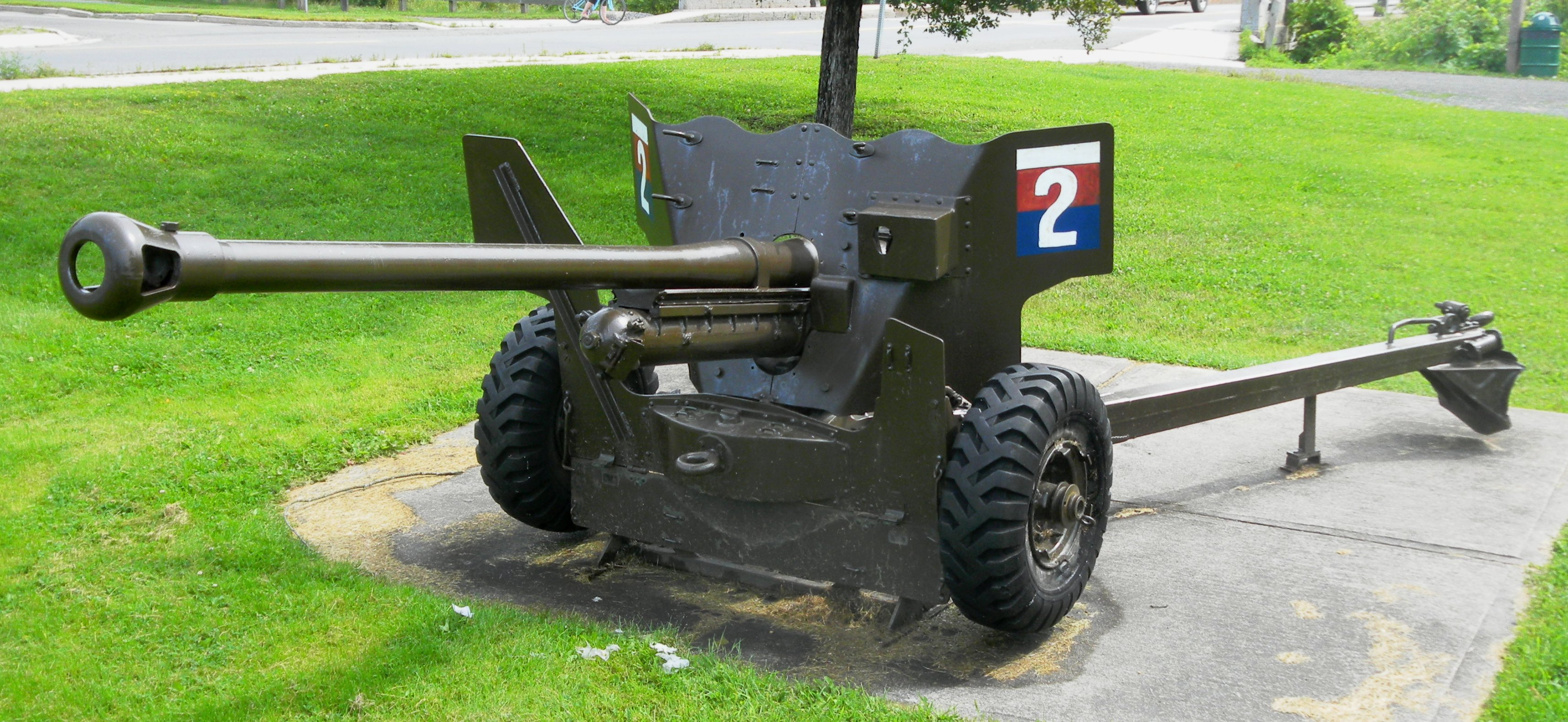
- An Ordnance QF 6-pounder preserved in Canada
- Type: Anti-tank gun Tank gun
- Place of origin: United Kingdom

Service history
- In service: 1942–1960
- Used by: See § Users
- Wars: List of conflicts: World War II; First Indochina War; Korean War; 1956 Suez War; North Yemen Civil War; Nigerian Civil War

Production history
- Designed: 1940
- Produced: 1941–1945
- Variants: See § Variants

Specifications
- Mass: Mk II gun (L/43): 1,145 kilograms (2,520 lb) (field gun total) 350 kilograms (770 lb) (gun with breech); Mk IV gun (L/50): 2,679 lb (1,215 kg); US M1 gun (L/50): 2,679 lb (1,215 kg)
- Barrel length: Mk II, III gun: 8 ft 4 in (2.54 m) L/43; Mk IV, V gun: 9 ft 3 in (2.82 m) L/50; US M1 gun: 9 ft 3 in (2.82 m) L/50
- Width: 5 ft 11 in (1.8 m)
- Height: 4 ft 2 in (1.28 m)
- Crew: 6
- Shell: Fixed QF 57×441 mmR
- Calibre: 2.244 in (57 mm)
- Breech: Vertical sliding-block
- Recoil: Hydro-pneumatic
- Carriage: Split trail
- Elevation: -5° / +15°
- Traverse: 90°
- Rate of fire: 15 rounds/min
- Muzzle velocity: See ammunition table
- Effective firing range: 1,650 yd (1,510 m)
- Maximum firing range: 5,000 yd (4,600 m)
- Sights: No.22c

The Ordnance quick-firing 6-pounder 7 cwt, (Note: British forces traditionally denoted smaller ordnance by the weight of its standard projectile, in this case approximately 6 pounds (2.7 kg). The approximate weight of the gun barrel and breech, "7 cwt" (cwt = hundredweight), was included in the designation to distinguish this gun from others also firing a 6 lb projectile.) or just 6-pounder, was a British 57 mm gun, serving during the Second World War as a primary anti-tank gun of both the British and United States Army (as the 57 mm gun M1). It was also used as the main armament for a number of armoured fighting vehicles.

Although designed before the start of the war, it did not reach service until the North African Campaign in April 1942, where it replaced the 2-pounder as an anti-tank gun, allowing the 25-pounder gun-howitzer to revert to its intended artillery role.

== Development and production ==
=== Development ===
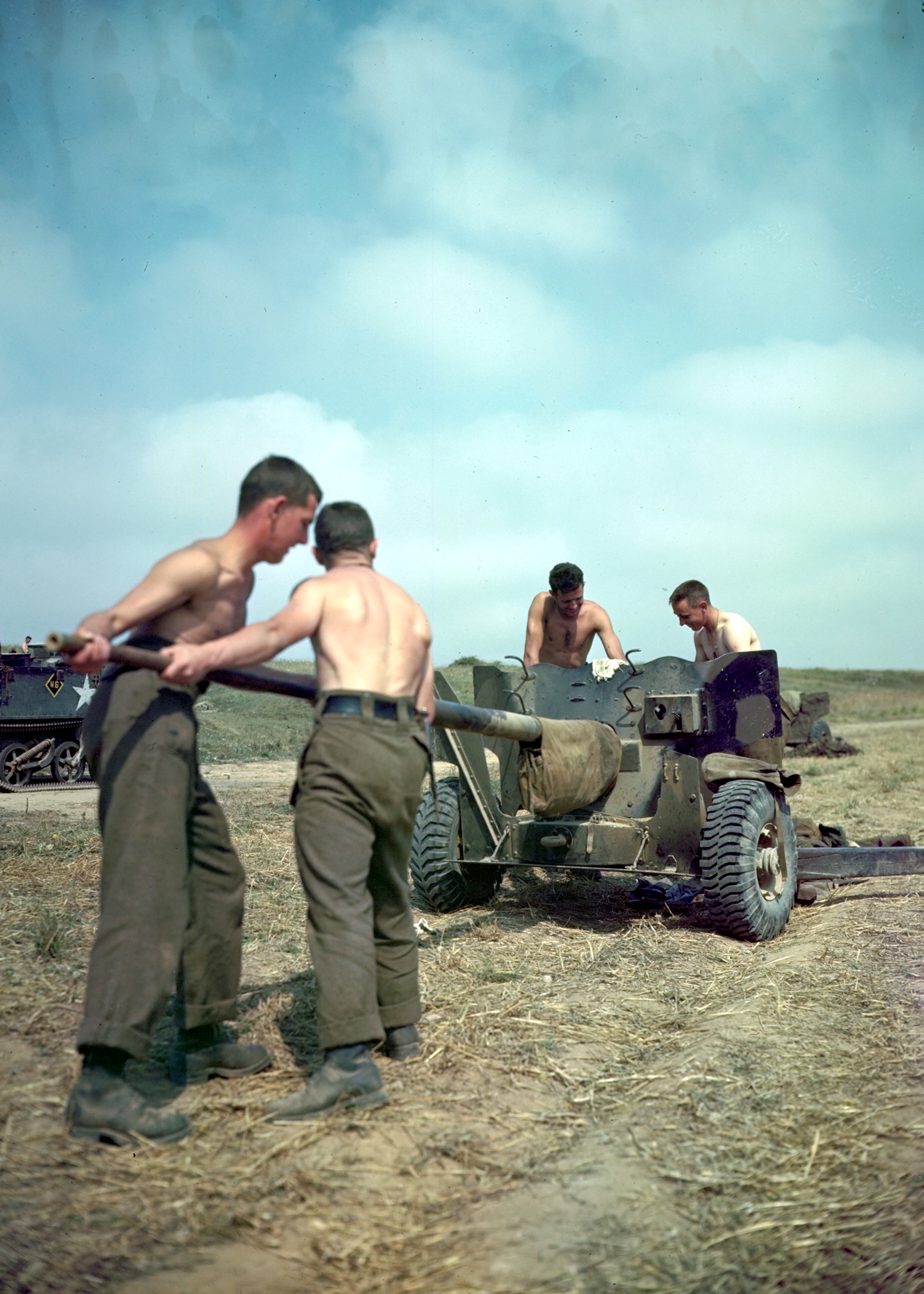
A Canadian gun crew performing maintenance on the bore of their 6-pounder

Limitations of the existing 2-pounders were apparent even as the gun entered service in 1938. An effort was made to replace it with a much more capable weapon starting that year.

The Woolwich Arsenal was entrusted with the development of a new gun with a calibre of 57 mm. Guns of this calibre had been employed by the Royal Navy from the late 19th century and manufacturing equipment was available. The gun design was complete by 1940 but the carriage design took until 1941. The production was further delayed by the defeat in the Battle of France. The loss of equipment – most of the heavy equipment of the British Expeditionary Force (BEF) was left behind in France during Operation Dynamo – and the prospect of a German invasion made re-equipping the army with anti-tank weapons an urgent task. The decision was made to carry on the production of the 2-pounder, avoiding the period of adaptation to production and also of re-training and acclimatisation with the new weapon. It was estimated that 100 6-pounders would displace the production of 600 2-pounders. This had the effect of delaying production of the 6-pounder until November 1941 and its entry into service until May 1942.

Unlike the 2-pounder, which was mounted on a 360-degree traverse, the new gun was mounted on a conventional two-wheeled split trail carriage on pneumatic tyres but without a spring suspension. The first mass production variant, the Mk II, differed from the pre-production Mk I in having a shorter L/43 barrel, because of the shortage of suitable lathes. The Mk IV was fitted with an L/50 barrel, with muzzle brake. Optional side shields were issued to give the crew better protection but were apparently rarely used.

The 6-pounder was used where possible to replace the 2-pounder in British tanks, requiring work on the turrets, pending the introduction of new tanks designed for the 6-pounder. The Churchill Marks III and IV, Valentine Mark IX and Crusader Mark III all began to enter service during 1942. The Valentine and Crusader both needed to lose a crew member from the turret. Tanks designed to take the 6-pounder were the troubled Cavalier, the Cromwell and the Centaur. When the Cromwell went into combat in 1944, it was armed with the Ordnance QF 75 mm gun, which was a redesign of the 6-pounder to take US 75 mm ammunition which made it more useful against general targets. The 6-pounder was also fitted to the AEC armoured car Mark II.

Although the 6-pounder was kept at least somewhat competitive through the war, the Army started the development of a more powerful weapon in 1942. The aim was to produce a gun with the same general dimensions and weight as the 6-pounder but with improved performance. The first attempt was an 8-pounder of 59 calibre length but this version proved too heavy to be used in the same role as the 6-pounder. A second attempt was made with a shorter 48 calibre barrel but this proved to have only marginally better performance than the 6-pounder and the program was cancelled in January 1943.

The 6-pounder was followed into production by the next generation British anti-tank gun, the Ordnance QF 17-pounder, which came into use from February 1943. As a smaller and more manoeuvrable gun, the 6-pounder continued to be used by the British Army for the rest of World War II and for about 20 years afterwards. A 57/42.6 mm squeeze bore adaptor was developed for the gun but was never adopted. The gun was also produced in Canada and South Africa, where the Combined Ordnance Factories (COFAC) produced 300.

== Production ==
Production of guns
| Year | 1941 | 1942 | 1943 | 1944 | 1945 |
| Number | 201 | 17,854 | 16,586 | 1,964 | - |

=== US production ===
М1 production
| Year | 1942 | 1943 | 1944 | 1945 | Total |
| Number produced | 3,877 | 5,856 | 3,902 | 2,002 | 15,637 |

The idea of manufacturing the 6-pounder in the US was expressed by US Army Ordnance in February 1941. The US Army still favoured the 37mm gun M3 and production was planned solely for lend lease. The US version, classified as substitute standard as 57 mm gun M1, was based on the 6-pounder Mark II, two units of which were received from the UK. Since there was sufficient lathe capacity, the longer barrel could be produced from the start. Production started early in 1942 and continued until 1945. The M1A1 variant used US combat tyres and wheels. The M1A2 introduced the British practice of free traverse, meaning that the gun could be traversed by the crew pushing and pulling on the breech, instead of solely geared traverse, from September 1942. The M1 was made standard issue in the spring of 1943. A more stable carriage was developed but not introduced. Once the 57 mm entered US service, a modified towing point design was introduced (the M1A3) for US use. Tractors for the M1 included the Dodge WC-63 1½-ton 6×6 and the M2 half-track.

Two-thirds of American production (10,000 guns) went to American units, while about one-third (over 4,200 guns) was delivered to the UK, and 400 guns were sent to the Soviet Union through Lend-Lease. When the United States re-armed and re-equipped Free French forces for the Normandy landings, their anti-tank units received American-made M1s. Like the British Army, the US Army also experimented with a squeeze bore adaptor (57/40 mm T10) but the program was abandoned. American shell designs and production lagged behind the introduction of the gun once it was accepted for service and so, at first, only AP shot was available. The HE shell was not available until after the Normandy landings, so UK stocks were procured to cover its absence. Its use by regular US Army front-line units was discontinued in the 1950s.

== Service history ==
=== British service ===
==== Anti-tank gun ====
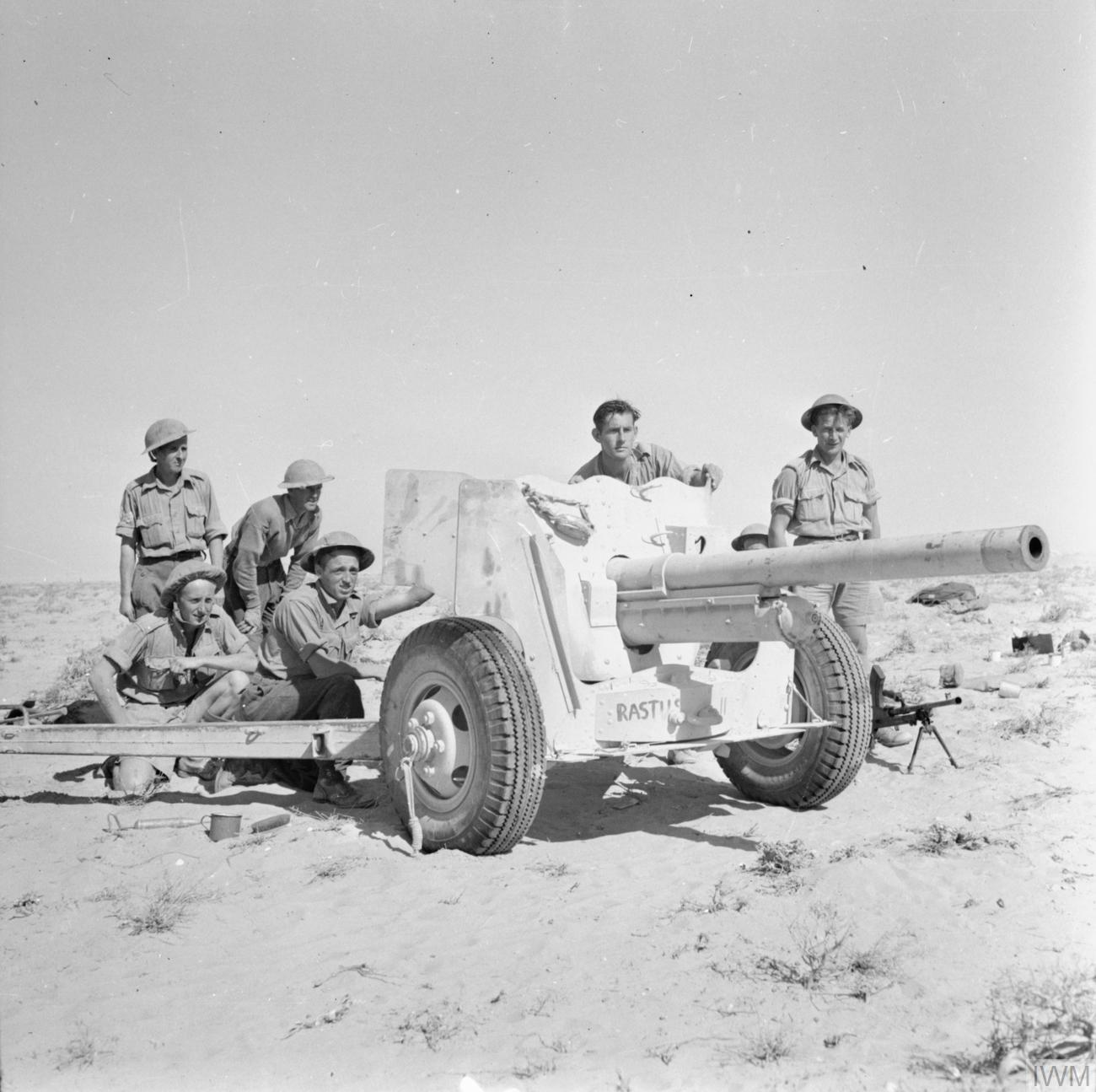
A US-built 57mm M1A1 or M1A2 copy of the 6-pounder anti-tank gun and its crew in action in the Western Desert, November 1942

The 6-pounders (and the US-built M1 of which 4,242 guns were received) were issued to the Royal Artillery anti-tank regiments of infantry and armoured divisions in the western theatres (four batteries with 12 pieces each) and later in the war to the six-gun anti-tank platoons of infantry battalions. An air-landing battalion had an AA/AT company with two four-gun AT platoons. The Far East theatres had lower priority and different organisation, reflecting the lower tank threat. The gun was also employed by Commonwealth forces in formations similar to the British. The anti-tank ammunition was a basic Armour-Piercing (AP) shot, but by January 1943 an Armour-Piercing, Capped (APC) shot and an Armour-Piercing, Capped, Ballistic Capped (APCBC) shot was supplied. A High Explosive shell was produced for use against unarmoured targets.

The 6-pounder first saw action in May 1942 at the Battle of Gazala. It made an immediate impact on the battlefield as it was able to penetrate any enemy tank then in service. In the most celebrated action, the 6-pounder guns of 2nd Battalion, The Rifle Brigade (together with part of 239 Anti-Tank Battery Royal Artillery under command), destroyed more than 15 Axis tanks in the action at Outpost Snipe during the Second Battle of El Alamein. Over the next year, the Germans introduced much heavier tanks into service, notably the Tiger I. The standard 6-pounder shot was ineffective against the front armour at any range but proved effective on the less armoured sides and rear.

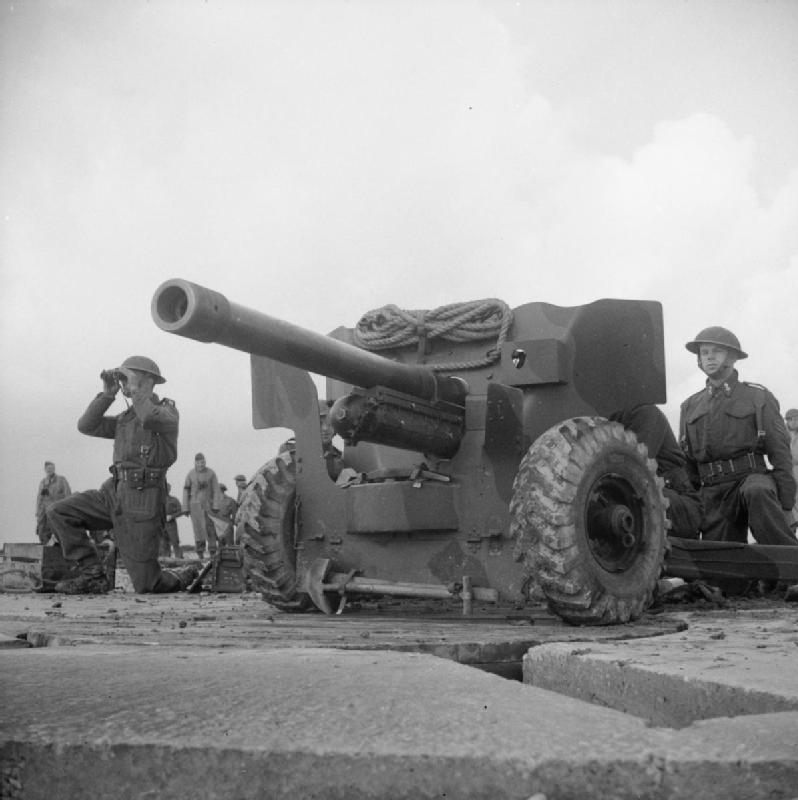
A gun of 86th Anti-Tank Regiment prepares to fire during a practice shoot at the Royal Artillery ranges, September 1942

6-pounder gunfire accounted for the first Tigers disabled in North Africa; two Tigers being knocked out by towed 6-pounder AT guns, while the 48th Royal Tank Regiment knocked out the first Tigers by the Western Allies in tank vs. tank action with their Churchill tanks, destroying two Tiger I (the same unit also knocked out the first Panther tanks by the Western Allies in May 1944 in Italy). The North Irish Horse disabled and captured Tiger 131 after the crew had abandoned it after it received several hits, most seriously a shot which struck the turret ring, making traverse impossible. The situation was somewhat improved by the development of more sophisticated ammunition in the form of the Armour-Piercing, Composite Rigid (APCR) shot and the Armour-Piercing, Discarding Sabot (APDS) shot, which was available from 1944 and made it effective against the frontal armour of Tiger Is and Panthers.

In the Royal Artillery regiments, the 6-pounders were joined by the 17-pounders starting in 1943; in infantry units, the gun remained the sole AT gun in service until 1951, when it was finally declared obsolete and replaced by the 17-pounder in the British Army of the Rhine (BAOR).

==== Tank gun ====
The first tanks to go into action armed with the 6-pounder gun were the Crusader Mk III and the Churchill Mark III, both initially with the short barrel 6-pounder Mk III. Churchill Mk III saw action in the Dieppe Raid of August 1942. Six Churchills deployed to North Africa, as KingForce, were used in action at El Alamein in October, destroying five tanks and three AT guns for the loss of one Churchill. The Crusader Mk III served with the armoured regiments of 8th Army, and later with 1st Army when they landed in Tunisia. The 6-pounder was initially chosen for the A24 Cavalier, A27M Cromwell and A27L Centaur, all similar designs in competition to replace the Crusader. In 1943 a program was initiated to replace the 6-pounder with the Ordnance QF 75 mm, a dual role weapon with better HE performance. By 1944 only the Churchill Mk III and Mk IV still mounted the 6-pounder Mk V gun and these were able to take advantage of the new APDS round which could penetrate 140mm of armor at 1,000 yards. This ammunition was used in the N.W. Europe Campaign and in Italy.

==== Molins gun ====
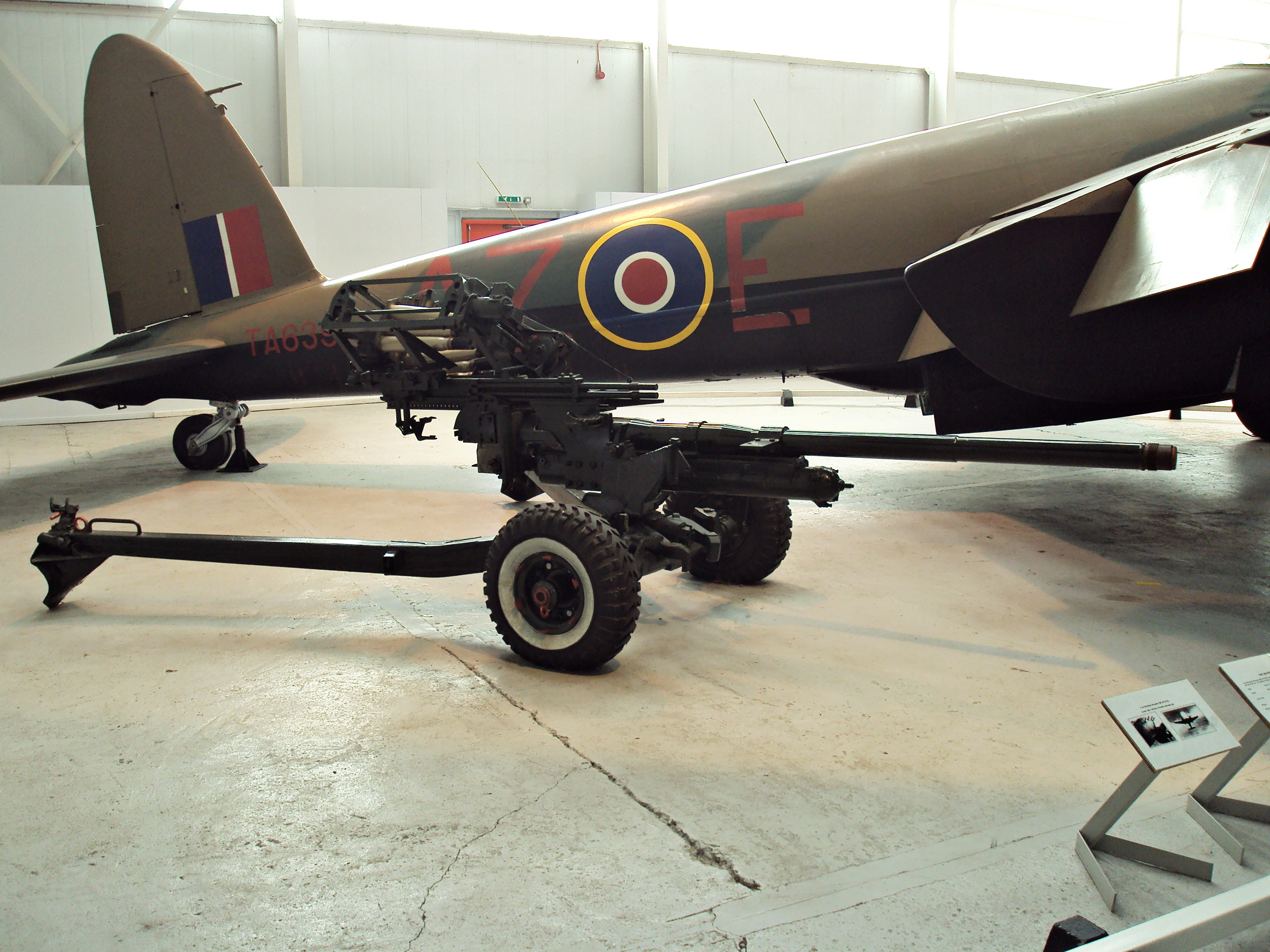
6-pounder with Molins automatic feed

The Royal Navy used the 6-pounder extensively in Motor Gun Boats during World War II (especially the Fairmile D). The gun was mounted on a hydraulic-powered mount and fitted with a power loading system developed by the Molins Machine Company Limited, permitting a six-round burst at one round per second. The guns were all the early short-barrel (43 calibre) type and fired exclusively HE (high-explosive) ammunition, at much lower muzzle velocities than for AP (armour-piercing), because of the use of flashless propellant for night operations. The naval designation was QF 6-Pounder Mk IIA; nearly 600 of these weapons were made.

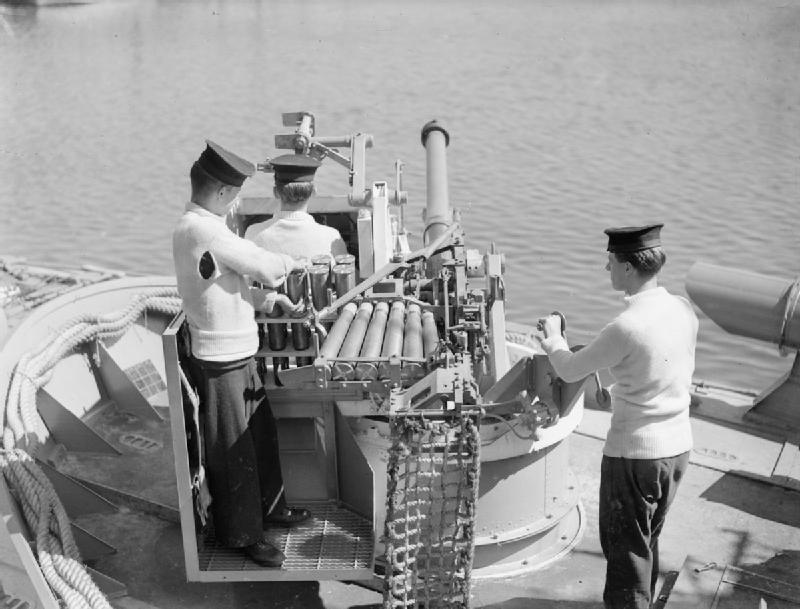
Gun with Molins autoloader on a Fairmile D motor torpedo boat of the Royal Navy, World War II

The Molins autoloader was also deployed on a small number of Royal Air Force de Havilland Mosquitos of Coastal Command, which were referred to as the "Tsetse" (after the Tsetse fly). Officially the QF 6-pdr Class M Mark I with Auto Loader Mk III, it was based on the long-barrelled (50 calibre) gun. It was fully automatic, with a cyclic rate of fire of about 55 rounds per minute with 21 rounds carried. It was intended for use against U-boats and fired solid shot that could penetrate their hulls through 2 ft (61 cm) of water from 1,400 m. The weapon was used to sink a U-boat and, on one occasion to shoot down a Junkers Ju 88 aircraft during an attack on IJN submarine I-29 off Cape Penas. It was replaced in 1943 by the more versatile but less accurate RP-3 3-inch Rocket Projectile.

=== US service ===
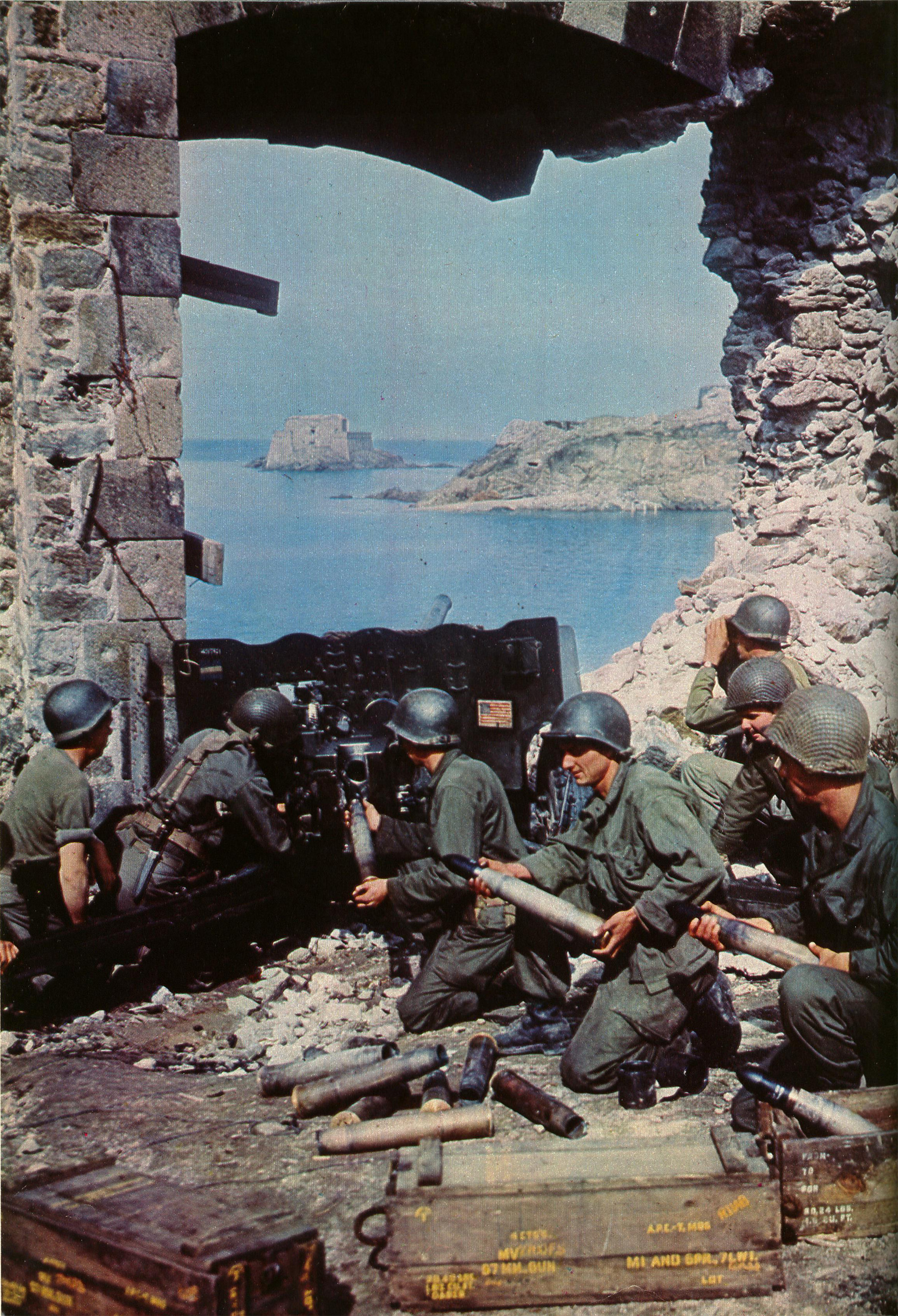
57 mm gun M1 firing at German bunker near Saint-Malo, Brittany

In spring 1943, following the experience of the North African Campaign, the Infantry branch of the US Army recognised the need to field a heavier antitank gun than the 37 mm M3. The Ordnance QF 6-pounder was introduced into US service as the 57mm M1, following standard US nomenclature.

The introduction was made in the face of objections by the US Army Infantry Board, which believed it to be too heavy. The Ordnance Board, on the other hand, felt that a more powerful weapon should be introduced; the Airborne and Cavalry rejected it.

According to the Table of Organisation and Equipment (TO&E) of 15 July 1943, the "defense platoon" in the infantry division's headquarters company had three 57 mm guns, each of the three infantry regiments' antitank companies included nine guns (three platoons of three) and each battalion had a platoon of three guns, giving a total of 57 57 mm guns per division. Dodge WC-62/WC-63 6×6 1½ ton trucks were issued as artillery tractors in place of the 3/4 ton truck used with its predecessor, the 37 mm gun. Because of the unexpected adoption into service, the only ammunition type in production in the US was AP ammunition.

By mid-1944, the M1 was the standard antitank gun of US infantry divisions on the Western Front and outnumbered the M3 in Italy. In this role, the gun had a crew of ten; a squad leader, a gunner (for crew drill purposes, designated #1), four cannoneers (#2-5), three ammunition bearers (#6-8), and a driver (#9). The gunner aimed and fired the gun, and cooperated closely with the #2, who was the loader. Crew member #3 passed ammunition to the #2. Crew members #4 and #5 prepared ammunition, and delivered it to the #3; #4 and #5 were also used as spotters or guards against enemy tanks or aircraft. Crew members #6-8 were ammunition bearers, while the driver was responsible for maintaining and concealing the prime mover and acting as a fourth ammunition bearer when not concerned with the vehicle. The squad leader and driver were issued M1 Garands, the gunner and cannoneers M1911 pistols, and the ammunition bearers M1 carbines. In addition, the driver was issued an M7 grenade launcher for antitank defense, and the squad was also issued a bazooka.

Preparations for the Invasion of Normandy highlighted an additional need. The Airborne Command had rejected the 57 mm M1 in the summer of 1943, claiming that it was unfit for airlanding by glider due to its weight and the TO&E of February 1944 still had airborne divisions keeping their 37 mm guns. To increase firepower, the 82nd and the 101st airborne divisions were re-equipped with British-manufactured 6-pounders on the narrow carriage Mk III designed for glider use – 24 in AA battalion, and 9 in each glider infantry regiment – for the Normandy airdrops. In the fighting after the Normandy landings, the paratroops used them against German armour near St Mere Eglise and Carentan. As few tanks were encountered, they were mostly used for support, which made the lack of an HE shell more significant. Subsequently, the guns were officially introduced under the TO&E from December 1944. According to the TO&E, a division was issued 50 pieces: 8 in the divisional artillery, 24 in the AA battalion, and 18 in the glider infantry regiment; parachute infantry regiments did not have anti-tank guns. The British guns were referred simply as 57 mm guns.

The British 6-pounder with the MK III carriage was also used by the Antitank Company of the 442nd Infantry Regiment as part of the glider-borne invasion force assigned at that time to the 517th Parachute Infantry Regiment, First Airborne Task Force, during Operation Dragoon, the invasion of Southern France.

Limited availability of different ammunition types limited the efficiency of the gun in the infantry support role. Only after the Normandy Campaign did the HE round reach the battlefield, although before then US units were sometimes able to get a limited amount of HE ammunition from the British Army. The canister shot was not seen in significant amounts until early 1945. Some British stocks of APDS were supplied to the US units, although APCR and APDS rounds were never developed by the US.

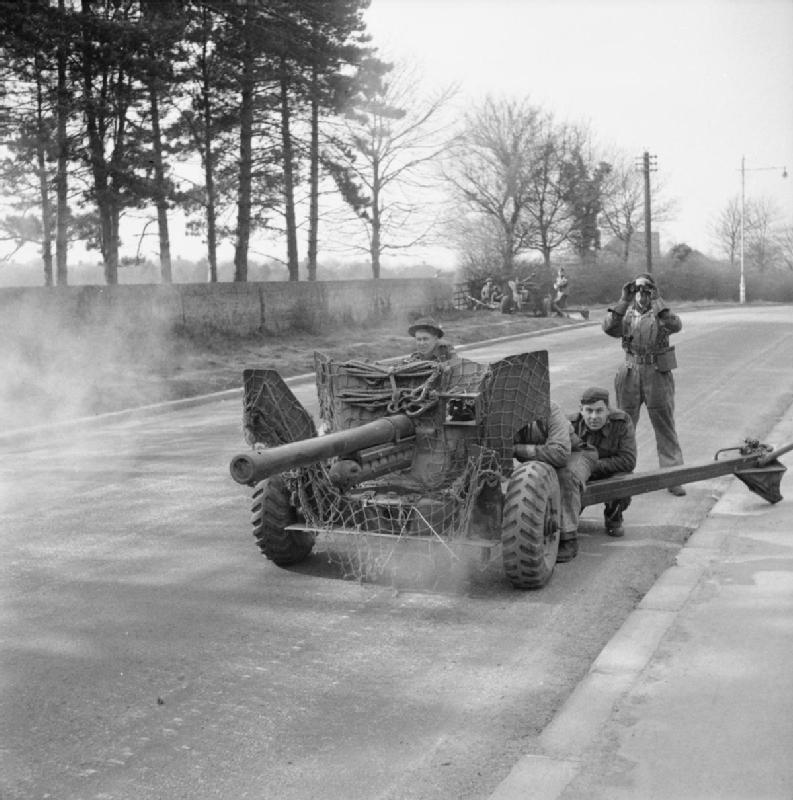
Canadian troops man a 6-pounder anti-tank gun during Exercise 'Spartan', 9 March 1943

From July, US anti-tank units encountered the Panther tank, which was vulnerable to the 57 mm only from the sides. Towed anti-tank guns were less effective in the hedgerow terrain, where mobility suffered; but, when the Germans went on the offensive in August, they were effective in defence with infantry. Towards the end of the war, towed anti-tank units had gone out of favour due to their lack of mobility compared to self-propelled guns. With few tanks to contend with, some units that would have been equipped with the 57 mm were instead deployed as infantry, or primarily with the bazooka for tank hunting. The M1 went out of service in the US soon after the end of the war.

=== Korean service ===
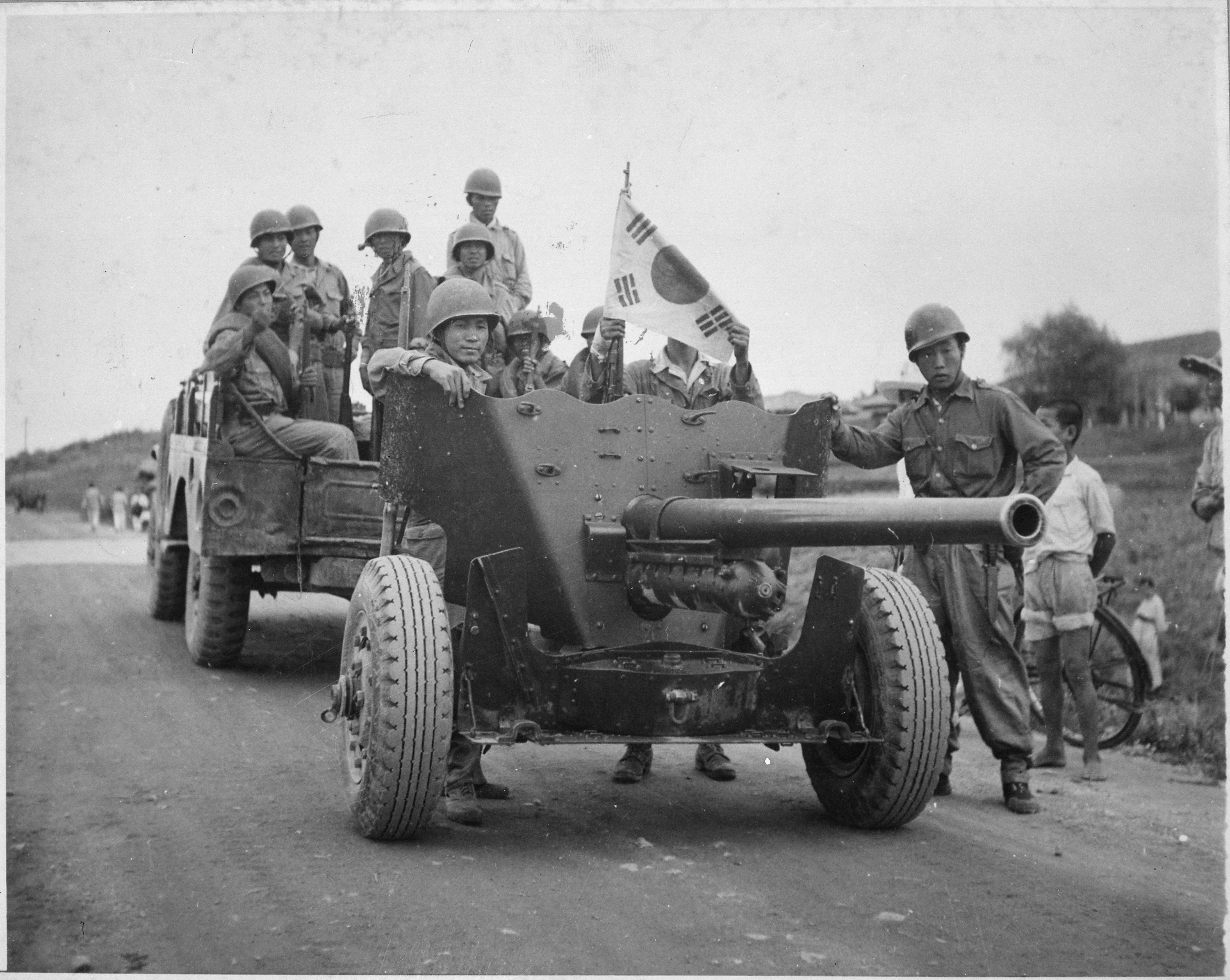
M1 in use by South Korean Army during Korean War

The M1 anti-tank gun was the main anti-tank weapon operated by the Korean military during the early stages of the Korean War. The South Korean military acquired 117 M1s when the U.S. Forces Korea withdrew from Korea in 1948-49, and the military deployed six guns to each infantry regiment's anti-tank battery. Due to the low number of anti-tank guns, the South Korean military expressed concern over the possibility of the possession of tanks by the North Korean military; however, the U.S. military advisers neglected the concern and claimed South Korea's poor road and bridge conditions are not suitable for effective tank operations.

When the Korean War broke out in 1950, the South Korean military actively used M1 anti-tank guns against North Korean tanks and self-propelled guns, but did not have much effect. Armor-piercing (AP) ammunitions did not have enough firepower to penetrate North Korean tanks, and nearly 70% of the 35,000 shells were anti-personnel high-explosives (HE). The South Korean military tried to overcome the disadvantage by firing at close range or concentrating on weak parts, but it did not have a significant impact on the war situation.

The South Korean military operated the M1 anti-tank gun as an infantry-assisted firearm from 1950 to 1951, and gradually retired it by replacing it with a M20 Super Bazooka and M20 recoilless rifle. In the end, M1s were eliminated during the war without much achievement due to lack of performance.

=== Other operators ===
In addition to being used by the US, UK and other Commonwealth forces, the M1 was supplied under the Lend-Lease program to the Free French Forces (653), USSR (400) and Brazil (57). Guns captured by the Germans were given the designations 5.7 cm PaK 209(e) and 5.7 cm PaK 202(a). The Israel Defense Forces employed the 6-pounder in the 1950s in brigade-level anti-tank battalions and battalion-level anti-tank platoons (the latter formations were disbanded in 1953). By late 1955, the Israel Defense Forces possessed 157 pieces and 100 more were purchased from the Netherlands in 1956, too late to enter service before the Suez Crisis. Some of those are described as "57-mm guns, nearly identical to the 6-pounders and firing the same ammunition", which apparently makes them US-built M1 guns. The gun was also used by the Pakistani Army; numerous examples can still be seen as "gate guards" outside army bases in Pakistan. The Irish Army acquired six 6-pounder anti-tank guns in the late 1940s. The US 57 mm M1 gun is popular with modern-day cannoneers, as there is a relatively good supply of shell casings and projectiles. The gun is also reportedly still in active military use with some South American countries, and in coastal defence emplacements of outlying island garrisons of the Republic of China Army.

During the Biafran War, from 1967 to 1970, both the Nigerian Federal Army and the Biafran armed forces, including some Biafran vessels, used the 6-pdr gun.

== Variants ==
Gun types

- Mk I – Limited production version with L/50 barrel. A few made in 1939, none issued to service.
- Mk II – First mass-production version. Shortened L/43 barrel was adopted due to the shortage of suitable manufacturing equipment.
- Mk III – Tank version of Mk II, with lugs on the breech ring for tank mounting.
  - C Mk III – Canadian manufactured Mk III gun.
- Mk IV – Mk II but with L/50 barrel and single baffle muzzle brake.
  - C Mk IV – Canadian manufactured Mk IV gun.
- Mk V – Tank version of Mk IV.
  - C Mk V – Canadian manufactured Mk V gun.
- Molins Class M gun – 6-pounder gun fitted with automatic loader built by the Molins company, a manufacturer of cigarette making machines. It was mounted on the Royal Navy Motor Torpedo Boats and in the RAF Mosquito planes, which were referred to as the "Tsetse".
- 57 mm gun M1 – US-built version; although based on Mk II, it had the "original" L/50 barrel.

Carriage types, British and Canadian

- Mk I – Original split trail production model
  - Mk IA – Different axle-tree and wheels
- C Mk I – Canadian manufactured Mk I carriage.
- Mk II – Simplified design as an alternative for Mk I. Not adopted.
- Mk III – Lightened Mk I for use by airborne troops

Carriage types, US

- M1
  - M1A1 – US wheels and tyres
  - M1A2 (1942) – Improved traverse mechanism, allowing free traverse
  - M1A3 (1943) – Modified towing hook; the first version to be adopted by the US Army
- M2 (1944) – Caster wheel added to the right trail, relocated trail handles, new utility box
  - M2A1 (1945) – Improved elevation gear

== Self-propelled mounts ==
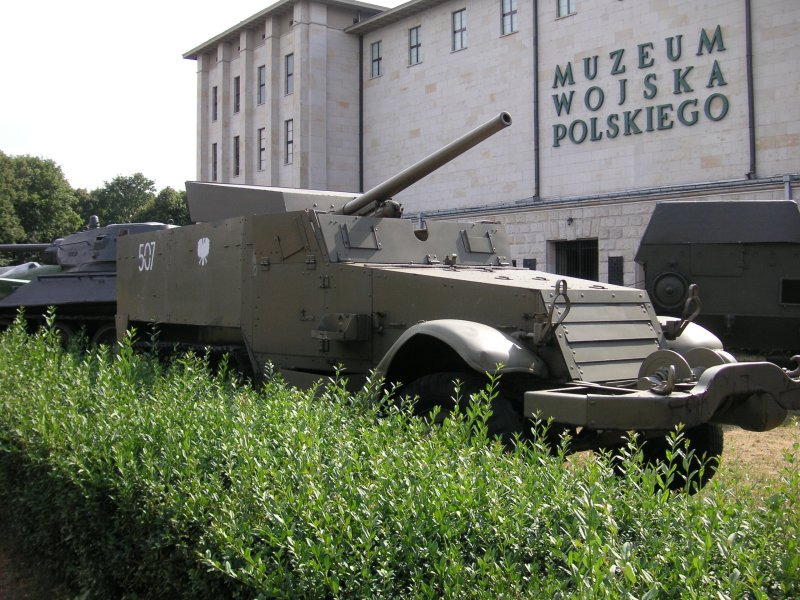
A T48 57 mm gun motor carriage in front of the Polish Army Museum

Tank gun versions of the 6-pounder were used in the Crusader Mark III, Cavalier, Centaur Mk I and II, Cromwell Mk I to III, Valentine Mk VIII to X and Churchill Mk III and IV, and also in the Canadian Ram Mk II and the prototype American Light Tank T7E2. The Deacon wheeled and the experimental Alecto Mk II self-propelled guns also mounted the 6-pounder. Another experimental vehicle armed with the 6-pounder was a 'Firefly' tank destroyer, based on the Morris Light Reconnaissance Car. The only mass-produced vehicle mounting the 57 mm M1 was the M3 Half-track based 57 mm gun motor carriage T48 (also known by its Soviet designation SU-57). The production of the T18E2 armored car, known as Boarhound in its limited British service, was stopped after 30 units were built. A project for a tank destroyer armed with the M1—the 57 mm gun motor carriage T49—was cancelled after a single pilot vehicle was built. Similarly, the wheeled 57 mm Gun Motor Carriage T44, based on Ford 4×4 ¾ ton cargo carrier chassis, was cancelled after brief testing.

== Ammunition ==
Ammunition was of the fixed type made up of projectile with a tracer in the base, a charge in a brass cartridge, and a percussion primer. A drill round made of weighted wood was also used. Propellant was cordite or NH, the latter being more compact than cordite as cordite had a piece of packing between the propellant and base of the projectile.

Available ammunition (Note: There were also practice rounds and blank rounds)
| Type | Model | Weight | Filler | Muzzle velocity (L/43 guns) | Muzzle velocity (L/50 guns) |
|---|---|---|---|---|---|
British ammunition
| AP | Shot, AP, Mks 1 to 7 | 2.86 kg (6 lb 5 oz) | - | 853 m/s (2,800 ft/s) | 892 m/s (2,930 ft/s) |
| APC (from September 1942) | Shot, APC, Mk 8T (Note: Together with different combinations of propelling charge these were Cartridges Mark IT through to Mark IVT and "HV" cartridges IT and IIT) | 2.86 kg (6 lb 5 oz) | - | 846 m/s (2,780 ft/s) | 884 m/s (2,900 ft/s) |
| APCBC (from January 1943) | Shot, APCBC, Mk 9T | 3.23 kg (7 lb 2 oz) | - | 792 m/s (2,600 ft/s) | 831 m/s (2,730 ft/s) |
| APCR (from October 1943) | Shot, APCR, Mk 1T | 1.90 kg (4 lb 3 oz) | - | | 1,082 m/s (3,550 ft/s) |
| APDS (from March 1944) | Shot, APDS, Mk 1T | 1.42 kg (3 lb 2 oz) | - | 1,151 m/s (3,780 ft/s) | 1,219 m/s (4,000 ft/s) |
| HE (Note: "HE Shell Mk I, foil" and "HE Shell Mk IIT, foil" using the Mk IM case) | Shell, HE, Mk 10T | approx. 3 kg (6 lb 10 oz) | | | 820 m/s (2,700 ft/s) |
US ammunition
| AP | AP Shot M70 | 2.85 kg (6 lb 5 oz) | - | | 853 m/s (2,800 ft/s) |
| APCBC/HE | APC Shell M86 | 3.30 kg (7 lb 4 oz) | Dunnite; 34 g (1.2 oz) | | 823 m/s (2,700 ft/s) |
| HE (authorised in March 1944) | HE Shell T18 / M303 | | | | |
| Canister (in production from January 1945) | Canister Shot T17 / M305 | | | | |

== Performance ==
The zone of dispersion of the gun was 90% in 4 by 3 ft (1.22 by 0.91 m) at 800 yd (730 m).

Estimated armour penetration (versus vertical armour)
| Type | 100 m (110 yd) | 500 m (550 yd) | 1,000 m (1,100 yd) | 1,500 m (1,600 yd) | 2,000 m (2,200 yd) |
|---|---|---|---|---|---|
British ammunition
| AP (L/50 barrel) | 135 mm (5.3 in) | 112 mm (4.4 in) | 89 mm (3.5 in) | 70 mm (2.8 in) | 55 mm (2.2 in) |
| APCBC (L/50 barrel) | 115 mm (4.5 in) | 103 mm (4.1 in) | 90 mm (3.5 in) | 78 mm (3.1 in) | 68 mm (2.7 in) |
| APDS (Note: Barrel length not given in source, but likely a L/50 barrel, given both the AP and APCBC were used with a L/50 barrel) | 177 mm (7.0 in) | 160 mm (6.3 in) | 140 mm (5.5 in) | 123 mm (4.8 in) | 108 mm (4.3 in) |
US ammunition
| AP (L/50 barrel) | 135 mm (5.3 in) | 112 mm (4.4 in) | 89 mm (3.5 in) | 70 mm (2.8 in) | 55 mm (2.2 in) |
| APCBC (L/50 barrel) | 110 mm (4.3 in) | 98 mm (3.9 in) | 85 mm (3.3 in) | 73 mm (2.9 in) | 64 mm (2.5 in) |

AP in use as a tank gun, penetration was 81 mm (for Mark 3 gun) and 83 mm (Mark 5) at 500 yards and target at 30°.

== Users ==
- 6-pounder Mk IV in action in Normandy.
- 57 mm M1 of the 44th Infantry Division in France, 1944.
- M1 in a street of Rimschweiler, Germany.
- 57 mm GMC T49.

- Australia – Used in World War II and in Korean War
- Brazil
- Canada
- Denmark – As 57 mm Infantry Gun (Fodfolkskanon)
- France
- Greece
- Ireland
- Israel
- Jordan – Arab Legion
- Nazi Germany
- Nigeria
  - Biafra
- Netherlands
- New Zealand
- Pakistan
- Philippines
- South Korea – Received 117 from the U.S. in 1948–49.
- Taiwan
- United Kingdom
- United States
- Soviet Union
- North Vietnam
- Kingdom of Yemen

== See also ==
=== Weapons of comparable role, performance and era ===
- Bofors 57 mm — Swedish anti-tank gun
- 57 mm anti-tank gun M1943 (ZiS-2) — Soviet anti-tank gun
- 5 cm Pak 38 — German anti-tank gun
