= Fairmile =

Fairmile may refer to:

- Fairmile, Blandford Forum, a neighbourhood/hamlet
- Fairmile, Cobham, a neighbourhood/hamlet
- Fairmile, Devon, a large, remote hamlet
- Fairmile, Dorset, a village/hamlet/suburb
- Fairmile, Henley-on-Thames, a neighbourhood/hamlet
- Fairmile Hospital, a former lunatic asylum
- Fairmile Marine, a British boat builder:
  - Fairmile A motor launch
  - Fairmile B motor launch
  - Fairmile C motor gun boat
  - Fairmile D motor torpedo boat
  - Fairmile H landing craft
- Fairmile Engineering Company, manufacturer of the British automobile Railton
