= HMS Caroline (1914) =

Royal Navy C-class light cruiser

Coordinates: 54°36′50″N 5°54′09″W

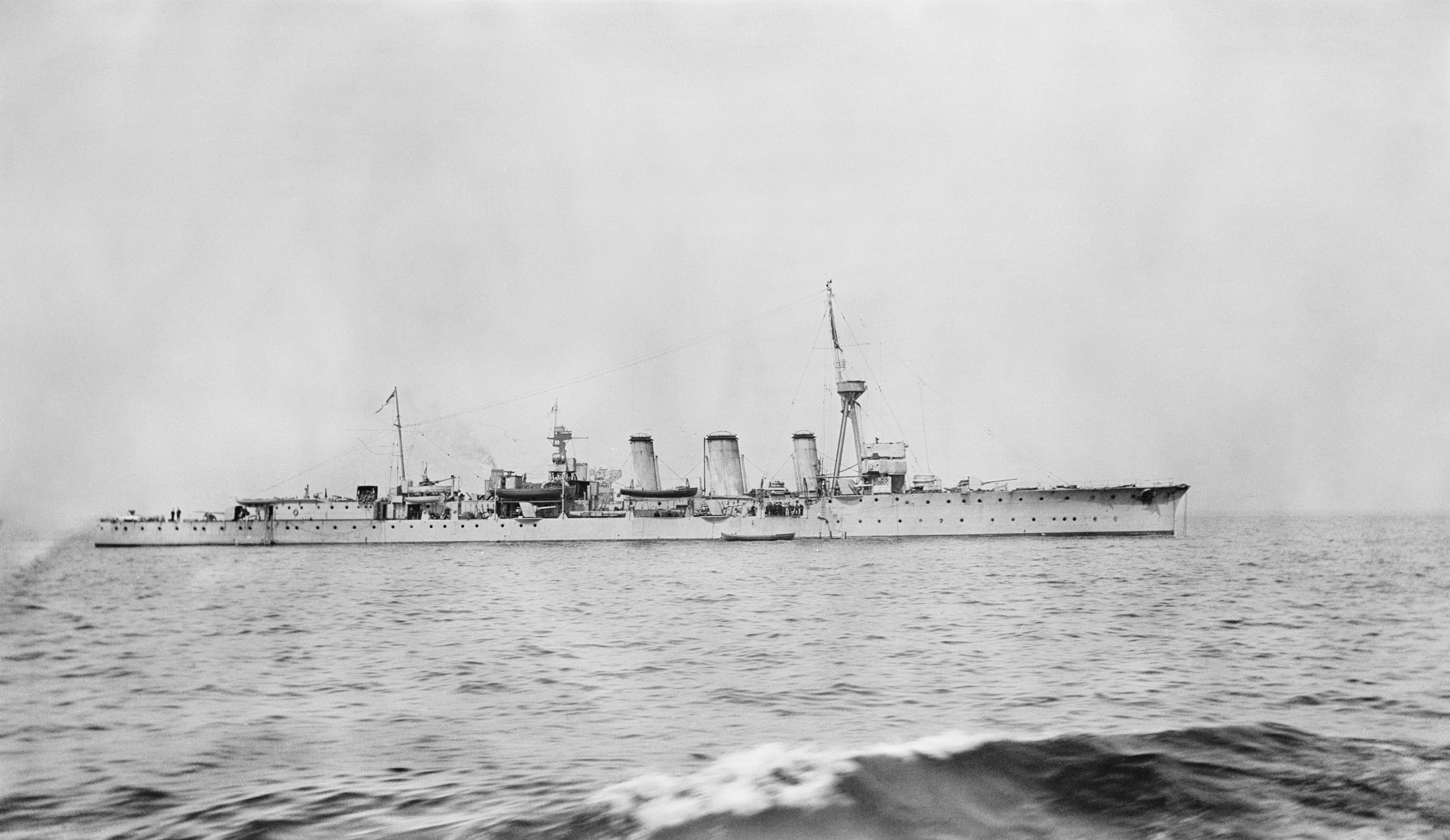
- Caroline in 1917

History

United Kingdom
- Name: Caroline
- Builder: Cammell Laird
- Laid down: 28 January 1914
- Launched: 29 September 1914
- Completed: December 1914
- Commissioned: 4 December 1914
- Decommissioned: February 1922
- Recommissioned: February 1924
- Decommissioned: 31 March 2011
- Identification: Pennant number: 87 (1914); 30 (Jan 18); 44 (Apr 18); 69 (Nov 19)
- Motto: Tenax Propositi ("Tenacious of Purpose")
- Honours and awards: Battle honour for Jutland 1916
- Status: Museum ship in Belfast, Northern Ireland

General characteristics
- Class & type: C-class light cruiser
- Displacement: 4,219 long tons (4,287 t)
- Length: 446 ft 9 in (136.2 m) (o/a)
- Beam: 41 ft 6 in (12.6 m)
- Draught: 16 ft (4.9 m) (mean)
- Installed power: 8 × Yarrow boilers; 40,000 shp (30,000 kW)
- Propulsion: 2 × shafts; 2 × steam turbines
- Speed: 28.5 knots (52.8 km/h; 32.8 mph)
- Complement: 301
- Armament: 2 × single 6 in (152 mm) guns; 8 × single 4 in (102 mm) guns; 1 × single 13 pdr (3 in (76.2 mm)) AA gun; 2 × twin 21 in (533 mm) torpedo tubes
- Armour: Waterline belt: 1–3 in (25–76 mm); Deck: 1 in (25 mm); Conning tower: 6 in

HMS Caroline is a decommissioned C-class light cruiser of the Royal Navy that was the lead ship of her sub-class. Completed in 1914, she saw combat service during the First World War and served as an administrative centre in the Second World War. The ship served as a static headquarters and training ship for the Royal Naval Reserve, based in Alexandra Dock, Belfast, Northern Ireland, for the later stages of her career. At the time of her decommissioning in 2011, she was the second-oldest ship in Royal Navy service, after the ship-of-the-line HMS Victory. Caroline was converted into a museum ship after she was decommissioned. From October 2016, she underwent inspection and repairs to her hull at Harland and Wolff and opened to the public on 1 July 2017 at Alexandra Dock in the Titanic Quarter in Belfast.

Caroline was the last remaining British First World War light cruiser in service, and she is the last survivor of the Battle of Jutland still afloat. She is also one of only two surviving Royal Navy warships of the First World War, along with the 1915 monitor HMS M33 (in Portsmouth dockyard). A third ship, the Flower-class sloop HMS President, (formerly HMS Saxifrage) was scrapped in 2026.

== Design and description ==
The C-class cruisers were intended to escort the fleet and defend it against enemy destroyers attempting to close within torpedo range. Ordered in July–August 1913 as part of the 1913–14 Naval Programme, the Carolines were enlarged and improved versions of the preceding Arethusa-class cruisers. Caroline is 446 feet 9 inches (136.2 m) long overall, with a beam of 41 feet 6 inches (12.6 m) and a mean draught of 16 feet (4.9 m). The ship displaced 4,219 long tons (4,287 t) at normal load as built and 4,715 long tons (4,791 t) at deep load. She had a metacentric height of 2.78 ft (0.85 m) at deep load

Caroline is powered by four direct-drive Parsons steam turbines, each driving one propeller shaft using steam generated by eight Yarrow boilers. The turbines produced a total of 40,000 shaft horsepower (30,000 kW) which gave her a designed speed of 28.5 knots (52.8 km/h; 32.8 mph). During her sea trials in late 1914, Caroline reached a speed of 29.1 kn (53.9 km/h; 33.5 mph) from 41,020 shp (30,590 kW). The ships carried enough fuel oil to give them a range of 3,680 nautical miles (6,820 km; 4,230 mi) at 18 knots (33 km/h; 21 mph). They had a crew of 301 officers and ratings.

The main armament of the Carolines consisted of two BL six-inch (152 mm) Mk XII guns that were mounted on the centreline in the stern, with one gun superfiring over the rearmost gun. Their secondary armament consisted of eight QF four-inch (102 mm) Mk IV guns, four on each side, one pair forward of the bridge, another pair abaft it on the forecastle deck and the other two pairs one deck lower amidships. For anti-aircraft defence, she was fitted with one QF 13-pounder (3-inch (76.2 mm)) gun. The ships also mounted two twin, above-water mounts for 21-inch (533 mm) torpedoes, one on each broadside. The Carolines were protected by a waterline belt amidships that ranged in thickness from 1–3 inches (25–76 mm) and a 1-inch (25 mm) deck. The walls of their conning tower were 6 inches thick.

=== Modifications ===
In February 1917, Caroline was refitted at Fairfield Shipbuilding & Engineering in Govan. At this time the pole foremast was replaced by a tripod mast and the two forward four-inch guns were removed in exchange for another six-inch gun mounted on the centreline.

== Construction ==
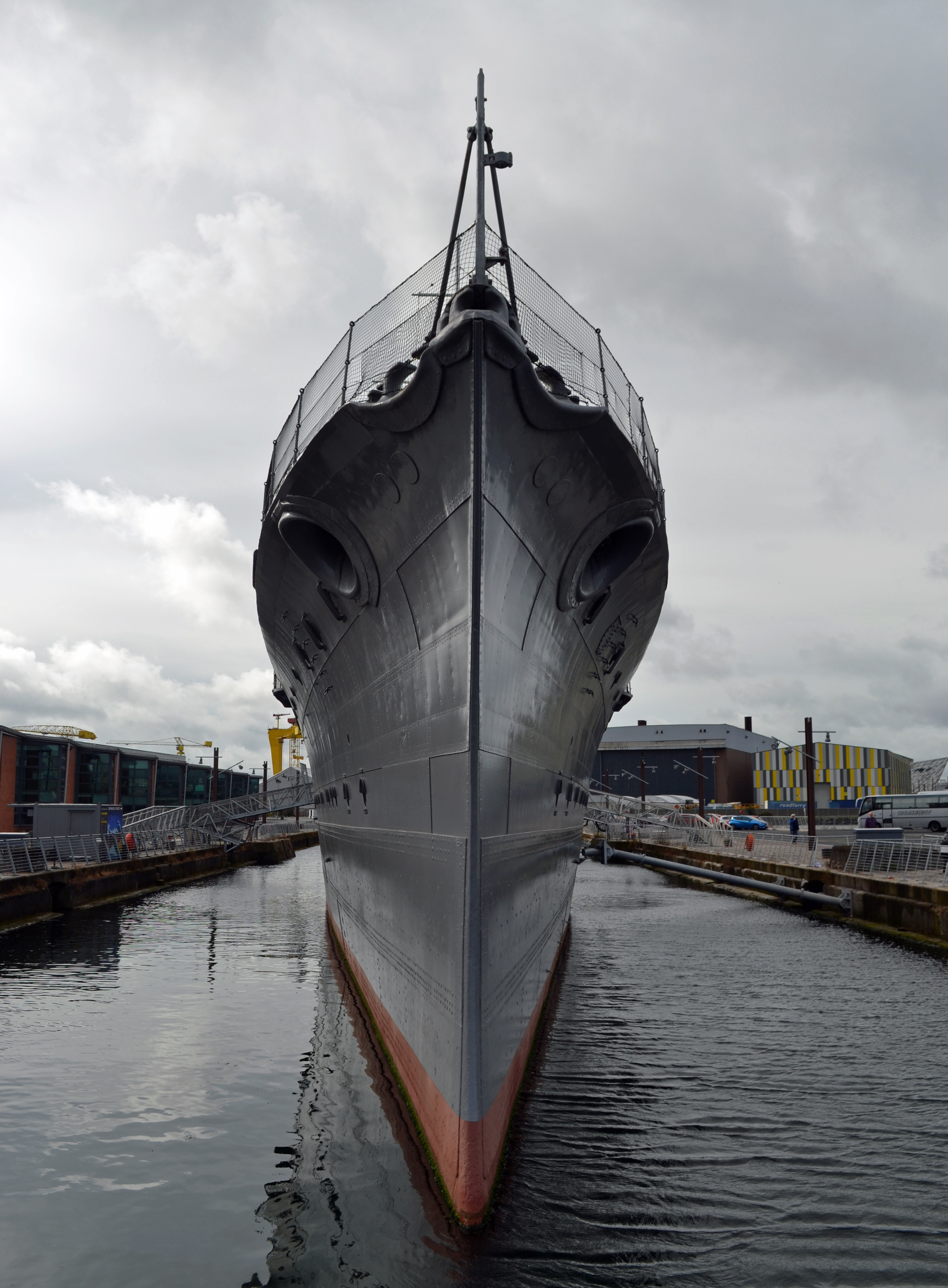
Caroline's bow

HMS Caroline was built by Cammell Laird of Birkenhead. She was laid down on 28 January 1914, launched on 29 September 1914 and completed in December 1914. Caroline was part of the early group of C-class light cruisers built without geared turbines and subsequent comparisons with later vessels of the same class demonstrated the superiority of geared propulsion.

== Operational history ==
=== First World War ===
Caroline was commissioned on 4 December 1914 and served in the North Sea throughout the First World War. Upon commissioning, she joined the Grand Fleet based at Scapa Flow in the Orkney Islands, serving as leader of the 4th Destroyer Flotilla. She was part of the Grand Fleet's 1st Light Cruiser Squadron from February to November 1915. In early 1916 she joined the Grand Fleet's 4th Light Cruiser Squadron and remained with it, fighting as part of it at the Battle of Jutland on 31 May – 1 June 1916 under the command of Captain Henry R. Crooke, through to the end of the war in November 1918. From 1917 until late 1918, she carried a flying-off platform for the launching of Royal Naval Air Service and later Royal Air Force fighters to intercept German airships operating over the North Sea.

=== Interwar years ===
Caroline remained in the 4th Light Cruiser Squadron after World War I and in June 1919 went with the rest of the squadron to serve on the East Indies Station. In February 1922 she paid off into dockyard control and was placed in reserve. She came out of reserve in February 1924 to become a headquarters and training ship for the Royal Naval Volunteer Reserve's Ulster Division at Belfast, Northern Ireland, officially beginning those duties on 1 April 1924. Harland and Wolff of Belfast removed her weaponry and some of her boilers around 1924, after her arrival in Belfast. Her guns were pooled with those of other decommissioned cruisers and used to reinforce the coastal defences of the Treaty Ports.

=== Second World War ===
From 1939 until 1945, during the Second World War, Caroline served as the Royal Navy's headquarters in Belfast Harbour, which was used as a home base by many of the warships escorting Atlantic and Arctic convoys, including Captain-class frigates of the 3rd Escort Group.

As Belfast developed into a major naval base during the Second World War, its headquarters outgrew the confines of HMS Caroline herself and occupied different establishments in various parts of the city. Eventually several thousand ratings were wearing Caroline cap tallies. The first such establishment was set up in the Belfast Custom House. Later, Belfast Castle was taken over and included a radio station. There were depth charge pistol and Hedgehog repair workshops associated with HMS Caroline, some of which would have been on the quays beside her berth in Milewater Basin.

During the early part of the Second World War when RAF Belfast occupied Sydenham (Belfast harbour) airfield, Fleet Air Arm personnel based there were lodged under HMS Caroline. In 1943, the airfield was transferred to the Admiralty and commissioned as HMS Gadwall.

=== Postwar ===
After the Second World War, the Royal Navy returned Caroline to the Royal Naval Volunteer Reserve, and she served as its last afloat training establishment. She underwent a refit at Harland and Wolff in Belfast in 1951.

The Royal Naval Reserve Unit decommissioned from the ship in December 2009, moved ashore, and recommissioned as the "stone frigate" (i.e., shore establishment) HMS Hibernia. Caroline herself was decommissioned on 31 March 2011 in a traditional ceremony. Her ensign was laid up in St Anne's Cathedral in Belfast.

== Preservation ==
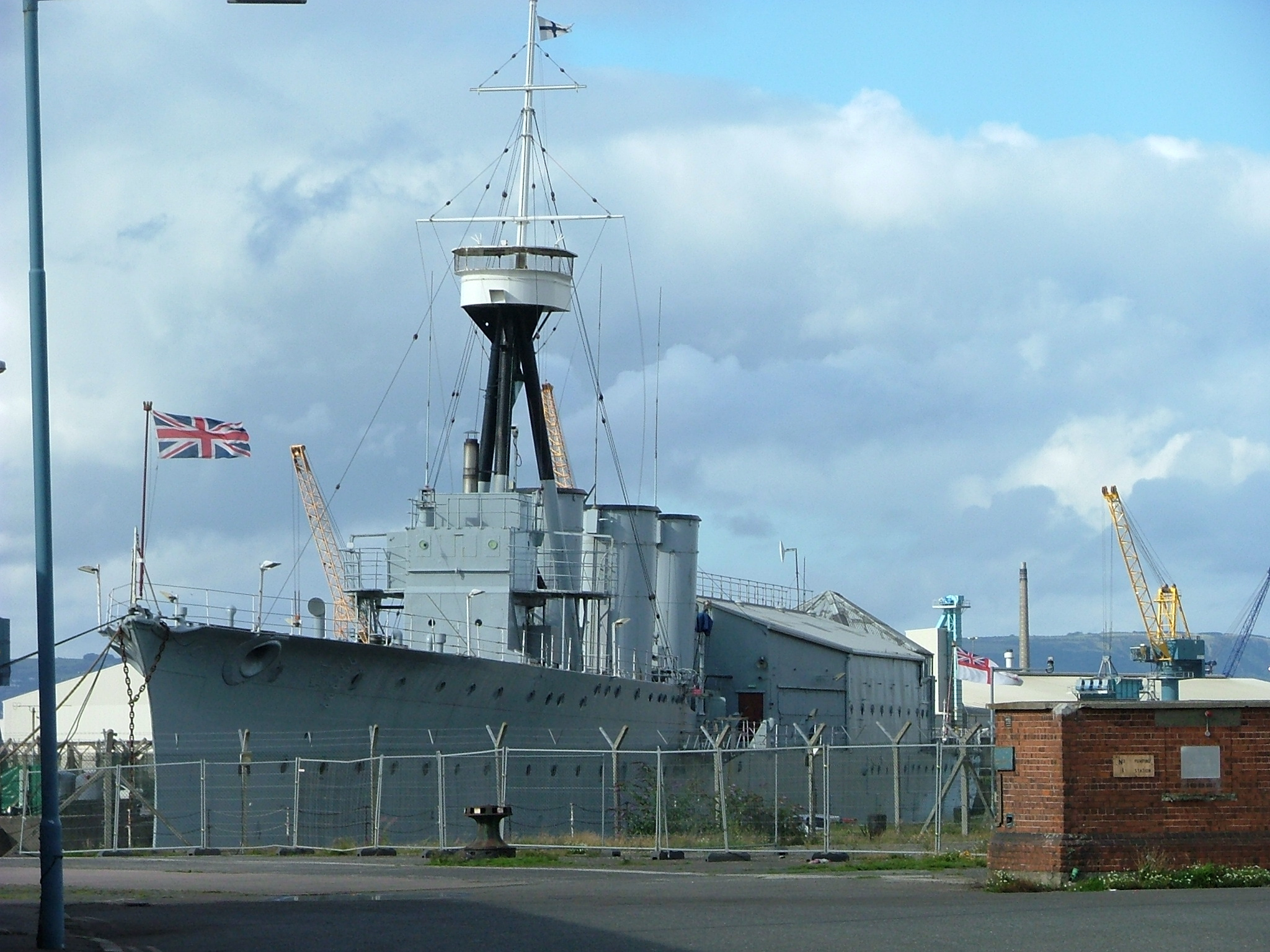
HMS Caroline sporting her three flags (From left to right) Union Jack, Commodore RNR's Broad pennant, White Ensign whilst still in commissioned service

Caroline is listed as part of the National Historic Fleet. On her decommissioning, she was placed into the care of the National Museum of the Royal Navy at Portsmouth, though remaining moored in her position in Alexandra Dock in Belfast. Although no longer capable of making way under her own power, Caroline remains afloat and in excellent condition. Buffeting from waves and high winds have caused the ship to almost come away from her moorings several times. In 2005, during a storm, she ripped several huge bollards out of the jetty concrete, but failed to break free entirely. She was not normally open to tourists, although entrance was gained during the annual RMS Titanic celebrations.

Upon Caroline's decommissioning in 2011, her future was uncertain. Proposals were made to return the ship to her First World War appearance, which among other things would have involved sourcing and installing 6-inch (152.4 mm) and 4-inch (102 mm) guns of that era and removing the large deckhouse from her midships deck. One proposal considered was to remain in Belfast as a museum ship within the Titanic Quarter development alongside SS Nomadic. Another proposal was a move to Portsmouth, with many of her original fittings restored to return her as much as possible to her First World War appearance.

In June 2012 plans to move Caroline to Portsmouth were announced, subject to the availability of funding. However, in October 2012 the Northern Ireland government announced that the ship would remain in Belfast and that the National Heritage Memorial Fund had pledged £1,000,000 to help to restore her. In May 2013 the Heritage Lottery Fund announced an £845,600 grant to support conversion work as a museum.

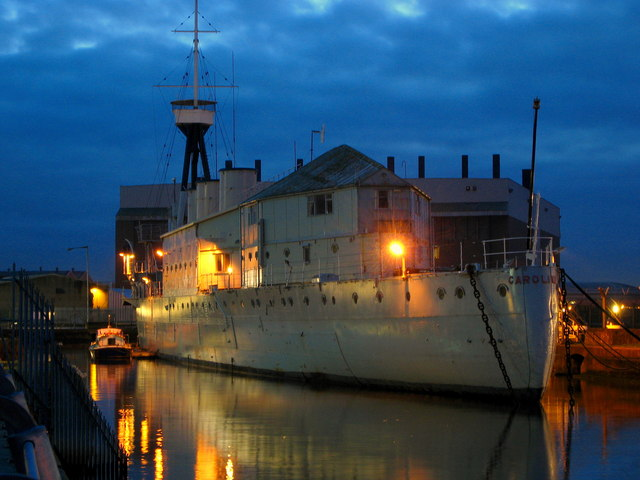
Stern view of Caroline at night

In October 2014, the Heritage Lottery Fund announced a £12 million lottery funding boost to enable the National Museum of the Royal Navy to turn Caroline into a visitor attraction in time for centenary commemorations of the 1916 Battle of Jutland. Caroline remains moored in the Alexandra Dock in the Titanic Quarter in Belfast. During the restoration the steam turbines which were left in place after her active service life ended were conserved. The Parson turbines were stripped of asbestos and preserved for those visiting to see.

In June 2016, HMS Caroline was opened to the public as a museum ship and forms part of the National Museum of the Royal Navy.

HMS Caroline was dry docked in late 2016 she was towed a short distance into Dry Dock to have hull inspection, clean and repaint. She returned to the Alexandra Dock on completion of the works and was placed into the dock stern first. In April 2019, she was one of five finalists on the shortlist for the Art Fund Museum of the Year award. She was also shortlisted on two categories for the RICS awards 2019.

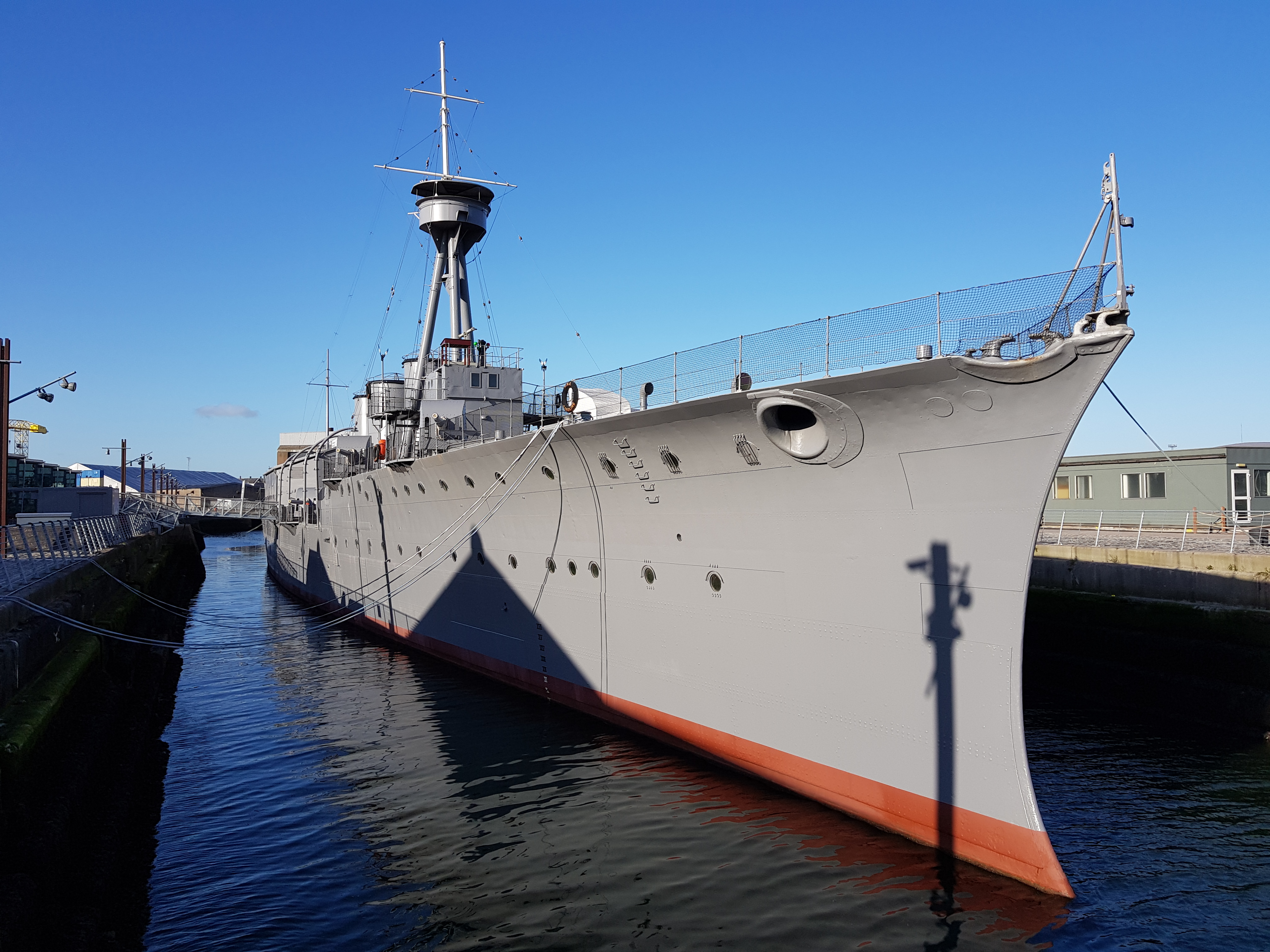
Caroline seen in 2018 post-restoration

Along with other tourist attractions, HMS Caroline closed her doors to the public on 17 March 2020, owing to the COVID-19 pandemic. The funding package from the Department for the Economy for the ship, to cover any shortfall in meeting costs, was in place until June 2020. The resultant funding gap threatened the continuation of HMS Caroline as a going concern in Belfast. Talks over a new funding agreement between the DfE and the NMRN were ongoing. A new funding package was announced, that would allow HMS Caroline to reopen, in order to keep her in Belfast until at least 2038. The reopening of Caroline to the general public from 1 April 2023 was announced by the NMRN. A year after reopening, the museum has revised its operating model and thereby reduced its times of opening, in order that the budget meets increased operating costs, as a consequence of the 2021–present United Kingdom cost-of-living crisis. The phenomena of fewer fee-paying visitors coupled with rising overheads is a common experience for museums in the UK.

== Records ==
At her decommissioning in 2011, Caroline held the title of the second-oldest ship in Royal Navy service (behind HMS Victory), as well as being the last First World War British light cruiser in service. She is the last survivor of the Battle of Jutland.

== Sources ==
- Allison, R.S. (1974). HMS Caroline: A Brief Account of Some Warships Bearing the Name, and in Particular of HMS Caroline (1914–1974), and of her Part in the Development of the Ulster Division, RNVR, and later RNR. The Blackstaff Press. ISBN 0-85640-056-4.
- Brown, David K. (2010). The Grand Fleet: Warship Design and Development 1906-1922. Chatham Publishing. ISBN 978-1-86-176099-9.
- Campbell, N. J. M. (1986). Jutland: An Analysis of the Fighting. Naval Institute Press. ISBN 0-87021-324-5.
- Colledge, J. J.; Warlow, Ben & Bush, Steve (2020). Ships of the Royal Navy: The Complete Record of all Fighting Ships of the Royal Navy from the 15th Century to the Present (5th revised and updated ed.). Seaforth Publishing. ISBN 978-1-5267-9327-0.
- Corbett, Julian (1997) [1940]. Naval Operations. History of the Great War: Based on Official Documents. Vol. III (2nd ed.). Imperial War Museum in association with the Battery Press. ISBN 1-870423-50-X.
- Dodson, Aidan (2024). "The Development of the British Royal Navy's Pennant Numbers Between 1919 and 1940". Warship International. 61 (2): 134–166.
- Dunn, Steve R. (2022). The Harwich Striking Force: The Royal Navy's Front Line in the North Sea, 1914-1918. Seaforth Publishing. ISBN 978-1-3990-1596-7.
- Friedman, Norman (2010). British Cruisers: Two World Wars and After. Seaforth Publishing. ISBN 978-1-59114-078-8.
- Newbolt, Henry (1996) [1928]. Naval Operations. History of the Great War Based on Official Documents. Vol. IV. Battery Press. ISBN 0-89839-253-5.
- Newbolt, Henry (1996) [1931]. Naval Operations. History of the Great War Based on Official Documents. Vol. V. Battery Press. ISBN 0-89839-255-1.
- O'Toole, Tracy (May 2017). "HMS Caroline". The Mariner's Mirror. 130 (2): 217. doi:10.1080/00253359.2017.1319129. ISSN 0025-3359.
- Preston, Antony (1985). "Great Britain and Empire Forces". In Gray, Randal (ed.). Conway's All the World's Fighting Ships 1906–1921. Naval Institute Press. pp. 1–104. ISBN 0-85177-245-5.
- Raven, Alan & Roberts, John (1980). British Cruisers of World War Two. Naval Institute Press. ISBN 0-87021-922-7.
- "Fleets etc., at home and abroad". The Monthly Navy list, for July, 1921, corrected to the 18th June, 1921. London: HMSO. July 1921.
