= Royal Navy Museums =

Group of museums in the United Kingdom

- Established: 2009; 17 years ago
- Director: Matthew Sheldon
- Website: nmrn.org.uk

Royal Navy Museums is a single non-departmental public body for the museums of the Royal Navy, known from its inception in early 2009 to 13 May 2026 as the National Museum of the Royal Navy. With venues across the United Kingdom, the museums detail the history of the Royal Navy operating on and under the sea, on land and in the air.

== Museums ==
The National Museum of the Royal Navy from 2009 onwards comprised the following:

Museum	Location
Royal Navy Museums, Hartlepool	Jackson Dock, Hartlepool
Royal Naval Museums, Portsmouth	Portsmouth Dockyard, Hampshire
Royal Marines Museum / Royal Marines Experience	Portsmouth Dockyard, Hampshire (previously Eastney Barracks)
Royal Navy Submarine Museum	Gosport, Hampshire
Royal Navy Museum, Naval Aviation	RNAS Yeovilton, Ilchester, Somerset
Explosion Museum of Naval Firepower	Gosport, Hampshire

== Historic ships ==
Ships of the National Museum of the Royal Navy include:

Museum	Location
HMS Victory	Portsmouth Dockyard Hampshire
HMS Trincomalee	Hartlepool
HMS Warrior	Portsmouth Dockyard Hampshire
HMS Caroline	Belfast County Antrim
HMS M.33	Portsmouth Dockyard Hampshire
HMS Alliance	Portsmouth Dockyard Hampshire

== Director ==
2009-2023 Dominic Tweddle

2024- Matthew Sheldon

== Background ==
In the financial year starting 1 April 2009, the NMRN co-ordinated Grants in Aid from the UK Ministry of Defence and the four original museums became integral parts of the NMRN.

The NMRN is also the custodian of HMS Victory, Admiral Lord Nelson's flagship at the Battle of Trafalgar in 1805.

HMS Alliance, the only surviving British Second World War submarine, re-opened following a £7 million conservation and restoration project, in 2014.

On 3 April 2014, The Babcock Galleries opened at the NMRN's Portsmouth Museum. The £4.5M project created 'HMS' – the Hear My Story exhibition, which tells the story of the 20th and 21st century Royal Navy and its people, and a special exhibition space.

In October 2014, the Museum received funding to restore D-Day Landing Craft (Tank) LCT 7074. The craft was raised from where it had sunk at moorings in Birkenhead, and was transported to Portsmouth for conservation.

In August 2015, the First World War Monitor HMS M.33, currently undergoing restoration, opened to the public. In December the same year, the museum acquired RML 497, a Second World War motor launch.

HMS Caroline, Belfast, joined the museum on 31 May 2016, on the centenary of the Battle of Jutland.

HMS Warrior was transferred to the museum in 2017 from the Warrior Preservation Trust, and the museum has helped finish ongoing HLF Works as well as undertaking a further restoration of the ship, including new paintwork on the ship's hull.
