= RML 497 =

Royal Navy motor launch of the second world war.

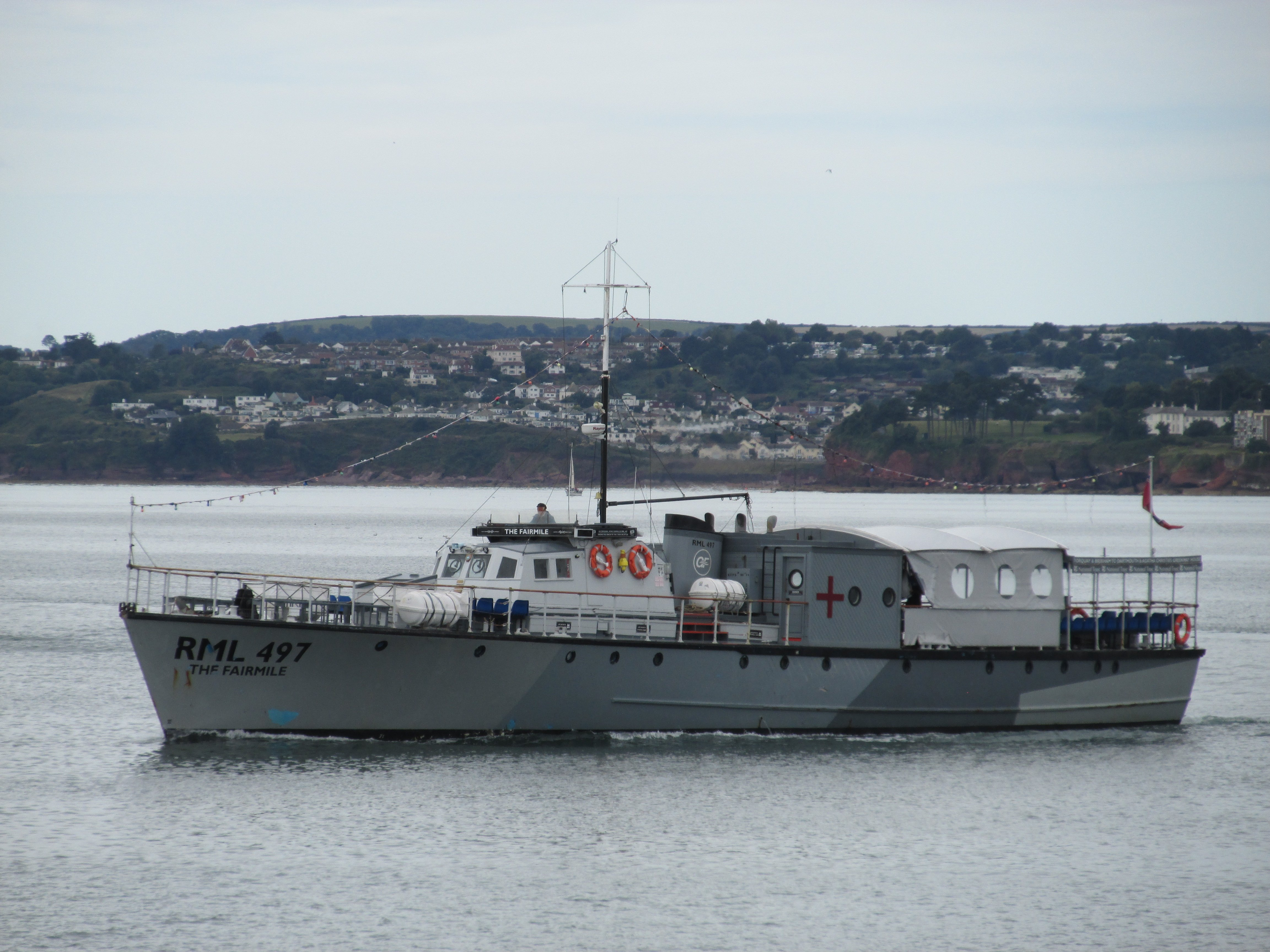
- RML 497, then known as MV The Fairmile, sailing on Tor Bay approaching Torquay Harbour in 2014

History

United Kingdom
- Name: RML 497 (1941); MV Western Lady III (1947); MV The Fairmile (2009)
- Owner: Royal Navy (1941); Western Lady Ferry Service (1947); Fairmile Classic Cruises (2007); Greenway Ferry (2009); National Museum of the Royal Navy (2015)
- Route: Torquay – River Dart
- Builder: Southampton Steam Joinery Ltd
- Launched: 1941
- In service: July 1942
- Refit: 1947, 2009
- Identification: IMO number: 8633906
- Status: Currently under restoration in Hartlepool

General characteristics
- Class & type: Fairmile B motor launch
- Type: Twin-screw motor vessel
- Tonnage: 108 GRT
- Length: 111.9 ft (34.1 m) LOA
- Beam: 18.3 ft (5.6 m)
- Draught: 4.6 ft (1.4 m)
- Decks: 2
- Propulsion: Twin Gardner 6LXB diesels
- Speed: Originally 20 knots
- Capacity: 175 passengers

RML 497 (Rescue Motor Launch number 497) is a former Royal Navy Fairmile B motor launch from World War II. She was named Western Lady III on her entry to civilian service, as a passenger motor vessel for Western Lady Ferry Service. From 2009 to 2015, she operated as The Fairmile for Greenway Ferry on their day cruise route from Torquay and Brixham to Dartmouth and Greenway. In May 2013, she was returned to her original wartime appearance. Torbay's "ferry wars" forced her removal from service, and in December 2015, RML 497 was acquired by the National Museum of the Royal Navy.

== Design ==
The Fairmile is a wooden hulled passenger vessel. The hull is split into watertight compartments; the midships compartment is the engine room, housing twin Gardner diesels, and an aft compartment contains the toilet facilities. The main deck has a forward open passenger deck. Aft of this, the forward deckhouse contains a chart room. In the centre of the main deck is a raised open deck area, surrounding the funnel, and with the open flybridge above the chartroom. Aft of the funnel is the main passenger lounge, originally the sick-bay, now named "Churchill's", in honour of Winston Churchill. The saloon is decorated with memorabilia of Churchill, including his profile etched on the side windows, and contains a bar. Both of the deckhouses are surrounded by an open passenger promenade deck. At the stern of the vessel, the former open deck has been enclosed with an awning.

== History ==
=== War service ===
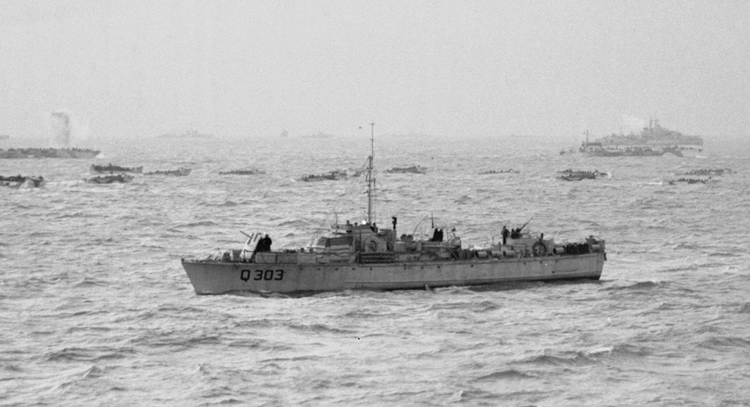
A Fairmile B Motor launch

RML 497 was built to the standard Fairmile B motor launch design, and was one of around 650 of the class built. The design was very adaptable, being fitted with pre-drilled rails for different uses – the Rescue Motor Launch (RML) type of which around 50 were built, including RML 497, were fitted with a sick-bay aft of the funnel – the present lounge.

RML 497 was built in 1941, and commissioned in July 1942. She was originally stationed with the 62nd ML Flotilla, based at Portland, Dorset, then in January 1944 was transferred to Kirkwall, in the Orkney Islands, being used for anti-submarine target towing. In August of the same year she was sent to Appledore, North Devon. She was later transferred to the 69th Flotilla at Felixstowe, before being decommissioned at the end of the war, and sold at Itchenor in Chichester Harbour.

=== Western Lady Ferry service ===
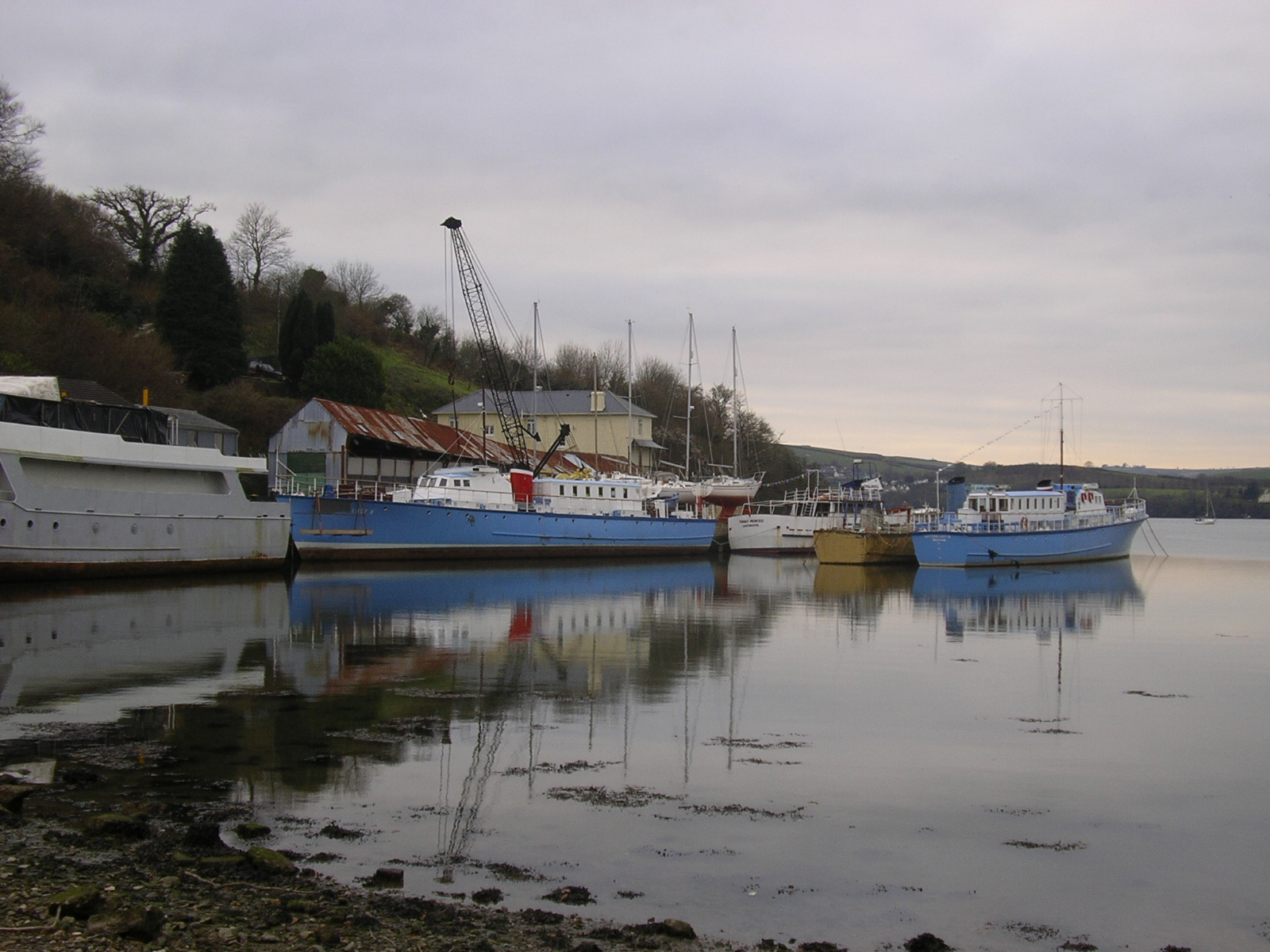
The Western Lady Fleet laid up in the winter of 2005. Western Lady III is on the right

In 1946, Mr Edhouse of Totnes purchased four of the RMLs, and converted them for use as passenger vessels on a ferry service from Torquay to Brixham, across Torbay in South Devon. The ferry had been run up until 1934 by the Devon Dock, Pier & Steamship Co, but had then lapsed, due to the vessel used, the SS King Edward, failing her boiler survey. The four RMLs were named Western Lady, Western Lady II, Western Lady III and Western Lady IV. All were re-engined, as their original engines used a fuel with too high an octane value for passenger service; in any case, the original Hall-Scott Defender petrol engines had been removed prior to sale by the Admiralty and returned to the US under the World War II lease-lend agreement. This reduced their top speed from 20 knots to 14 knots. In addition to the ferry service, the Western Ladies were also used on excursions, especially to the River Dart. The company was sold in 1963 to Torbay Boat Construction Co Ltd, of the Dolphin Boatyard in Galmpton, with little effect on the operation, though the launches were a familiar sight at the Dolphin Boatyard for their winter layup – in the summer the whole fleet was moored on buoys in Brixham Harbour. In 1967 Western Lady III spent some time running cruises around Dublin Bay, under the sponsorship of the Irish Government.

In 2003, the two remaining operational Fairmiles, Western Ladies III and IV, were supplemented on the Torquay – Brixham ferry by the more modern MV Torbay Princess and MV Torbay Princess II. This arrangement lasted until the end of the 2006 season, when the Fairmiles were withdrawn, following the closure of the Princess Pier landing stage in Torquay, which was used by the Fairmiles. The more manouevrable Princesses use the fish quay inside the harbour, which is inaccessible to the Fairmiles.

=== Swanage service ===
Western Lady III, by now the last Fairmile Passenger vessel (the Western Lady IV became a yacht), was bought in 2007 by Fairmile Classic Cruises, who operated her from Swanage in Dorset on circular cruises along the Jurassic Coast, and to Yarmouth, Isle of Wight. By early 2009, the company had run up debts, and the vessel had been impounded by the Maritime and Coastguard Agency (MCA). The owners of Greenway Ferry inspected her, and were given less than 24 hours to buy her by the harbour master, to avoid her being sold at auction to pay off the debts. This was achieved, and the Western Lady III returned to Brixham.

=== Greenway Ferry service ===
After a brief call in Brixham, Western Lady went to Polruan in Cornwall, where she was given a major (£35,000) refit, to return her to MCA standards, and to refurbish her passenger accommodation in Art Deco style. She was renamed The Fairmile to avoid confusion with the services of Western Lady Ferry Service, and to emphasise her history. In August 2009, she returned to Torbay, undertaking a series of 'Welcome Home' sailings, with the guest of honour being one of her wartime skippers, Eustace 'Mac' Mackmurdo, aged 93. A Winston Churchill impressionist was also present, who gave a speech.

The Fairmile replaced MV Riviera Belle on the day cruise route from Torquay via Brixham then along the coast to Dartmouth, and up the River Dart to Greenway Quay. Her additional capacity was needed on the route, as the competing service operated by MV Torbay Belle was withdrawn after the 2008 season. In addition, the National Trust opened Greenway House to the public for the first time in 2009. As the landing stage at Princess Pier, in Torquay is no longer safe for use, The Fairmile moors inside the harbour on Princess Pier, whilst she moors overnight on a buoy in Brixham Harbour.

In May 2013, she returned to service after an over-winter refit which saw her returned to her wartime appearance including 'English Channel' camouflage paint scheme and original service number.

In July 2015, Greenway Ferry announced that their Torbay operation, including the Fairmile, had been sold. They claimed unfair competition, owing to Torbay Council's subsidy of another ferry.

=== National Museum of the Royal Navy ===
In December 2015, the vessel was acquired by the National Museum of the Royal Navy. She was moved to the National Museum of the Royal Navy, Hartlepool from Southampton in 2019 in anticipation of a conservation programme to get her on permanent display. Having been removed from the water, it was decided that RML 497 would not return to it, her wartime hull no longer being suitable for such service. The vessel was placed in a purpose-built shelter in a car park to dry out, with the National Museum of the Royal Navy continuing to monitor her moisture levels as they slowly decrease. RML 497 continues to sit on a metal cradle in her shelter, with more supports needed as the boat dries out and hull weakens further. A full structural survey of the ship is planned so that at some point she may go on public display at the museum.
