= Fairmile H landing craft =

The Fairmile H Landing Craft were British landing craft of the Second World War. Initially designed for commando type raids from a base in Britain as a way of probing enemy defences and tying down additional troops, some were converted into fire support vessels.

Two variants were developed:

== The Fairmile H – LCI (S) ==
Class overview
- Name: Fairmile H LCI (S) Landing Craft Infantry
- Completed: 40
- Lost: 8

General characteristics
- Type: Fairmile H LCI (S) Landing Craft Infantry
- Displacement: 63 tons (light) 100 tons (loaded)
- Length: 105 ft 1 in (32.03 m)
- Beam: 21 ft 4 in (6.50 m)
- Draught: 2 ft 10 in (0.86 m) forward, 3 ft 8 in (1.12 m) aft (loaded)
- Propulsion: Two 1,120 hp or 1,500 hp supercharged Hall-Scott petrol engines. Silencers fitted. Twin screws.
- Speed: 15 knots (28 km/h; 17 mph) maximum at 2,000 rpm; 13.25 knots continuous at 1,500 rpm.
- Range: 330 nmi (610 km; 380 mi) at 15 knots (28 km/h; 17 mph), 700 NM at 12.5 knots. 4000 gal fuel.
- Complement: Crew: 2 officers and 15 men with accommodation. 6 officers and 96 men fully equipped below deck.
- Armament: 2 × 20 mm Oerlikon (or more), 2 × .303 Lewis guns.
- Armour: 10lb DIHT plating to deck sides, gun positions, generator house and forward bulkhead. 1/4in plating to deck

This was the Landing Craft Infantry (Small) "LCI(S)" boat. Forty of this type were built from 1942 onwards and numbered "LCI(S) 501" to "LCI(S) 540". Eight of them were wartime losses – 511, 512, 517, 524, 531, 532, 537 and 540.

- LCI(S) 501 – Tough Brothers, Teddington Wharf, Teddington.
- LCI(S) 502 – Cadnell Brothers, Maylandsea, Althorne, near Chelmsford.
- LCI(S) 503 – Frank Curtis, Looe, Cornwall.
- LCI(S) 504 – W. Weatherhead and Sons, West Harbour, Cockenzie.
- LCI(S) 505 – John Sadd & Sons, Maldon, Essex.
- LCI(S) 506 – Solent Shipyards, Bursledon Bridge, Sarisbury Green.
- LCI(S) 507 – Austins of East Ham, Twinn Wharf, Barking.
- LCI(S) 508 – Frank Curtis, Looe, Cornwall.
- LCI(S) 509 – Thomson and Balfour, Victoria Saw Mills, Bo'ness.
- LCI(S) 510 – J. S. Doig (Grimsby), Grimsby Docks.
- LCI(S) 511 – Leo A. Robinson, Broadside Launch Works, Oulton Broad, near Lowestoft.
- LCI(S) 512 – Brooke Marine, Oulton Broad, Lowestoft.
- LCI(S) 513 – Brooke Marine, Oulton Broad, Lowestoft.
- LCI(S) 514 – Brooke Marine, Oulton Broad, Lowestoft.
- LCI(S) 515 – Brooke Marine, Oulton Broad, Lowestoft.
- LCI(S) 516 – Frank Curtis, Looe, Cornwall.
- LCI(S) 517 – W. Weatherhead and Sons, West Harbour, Cockenzie.
- LCI(S) 518 – Southampton Steam Joinery Company, Southampton.
- LCI(S) 519 – Frank Curtis, Looe, Cornwall.
- LCI(S) 520 – Collins Pleasurecraft Company, Oulton Broad, Lowestoft.
- LCI(S) 521 – Frank Curtis, Looe, Cornwall.
- LCI(S) 522 – W. Weatherhead and Sons, West Harbour, Cockenzie.
- LCI(S) 523 – Cadnell Brothers, Maylandsea, Althorne, near Chelmsford.
- LCI(S) 524 – Thomson and Balfour, Victoria Saw Mills, Bo'ness.
- LCI(S) 525 – Tough Brothers, Teddington Wharf, Teddington.
- LCI(S) 526 – Itchenor Shipyard, Itchenor, near Chichester.
- LCI(S) 527 – Frank Curtis, Looe, Cornwall.
- LCI(S) 528 – Frank Curtis, Looe, Cornwall.
- LCI(S) 529 – Frank Curtis, Looe, Cornwall.
- LCI(S) 530 – W. Weatherhead and Sons, West Harbour, Cockenzie.
- LCI(S) 531 – J. S. Doig (Grimsby), Grimsby Docks.
- LCI(S) 532 – Collins Pleasurecraft Company, Oulton Broad, near Lowestoft.
- LCI(S) 533 – Leo A. Robinson, Broadside Launch Works, Oulton Broad, near Lowestoft.
- LCI(S) 534 – Brooke Marine, Oulton Broad, Lowestoft.
- LCI(S) 535 – W. Weatherhead and Sons, West Harbour, Cockenzie.
- LCI(S) 536 – Solent Shipyards, Bursledon Bridge, Sarisbury Green.
- LCI(S) 537 – H. T. Percival, Horning, Norfolk.
- LCI(S) 538 – Brooke Marine, Oulton Broad, Lowestoft.
- LCI(S) 539 – Brooke Marine, Oulton Broad, Lowestoft.
- LCI(S) 540 – W. Weatherhead and Sons, West Harbour, Cockenzie.

== The Fairmile H – LCS (L)(2) ==
Class overview
- Name: Fairmile H LCI (S) Landing Craft Support
- Completed: 10
- Lost: 3

General characteristics
- Type: Fairmile H LCS (L) Landing Craft Support
- Displacement: 84 tons (light); 116 tons (loaded)
- Length: 105 ft 1 in (32.03 m)
- Beam: 21 ft 5 in (6.53 m)
- Draught: 2 ft 3 in (0.69 m) forward, 3 ft 0 in (0.91 m) aft (light) 3 ft 8 in (1.12 m) forward, 3 ft 4 in (1.02 m) aft (loaded)
- Propulsion: Two 1,120 hp or 1,500 hp supercharged Hall-Scott petrol engines (fitted with silencers) driving twin screws.
- Speed: 15 knots (28 km/h; 17 mph) maximum at 2,000 rpm; 13.25 knots continuous at 1,500 rpm.
- Range: 700 nmi (1,300 km; 810 mi) at 12.5 knots (23.2 km/h; 14.4 mph) and 4,000 gallons of fuel.
- Complement: Crew: 2 officers and 23 men with accommodation.
- Armament: 1 × Ordnance QF 6 pounder in a tank turret 2 × Oerlikon 20 mm cannon 1 × twin 0.5-inch Vickers machine gun on power-operated mounting 2 × .303 Lewis guns. 1 × 4-inch smoke mortar
- Armour: 10lb DIHT plating to deck, hull sides and gun positions. 1/4in plating to deck

This was a Landing Craft Support (LCS) boat fitted with extra weapons to give fire support to landing craft particularly in being able to provide some anti-tank capability. This was achieved by the simple expediency of mounting a tank turret complete with its 57 mm 6-pounder gun on the forward deck. Ten of this type were ordered from May 1942 onwards, assembled at the boatyards of six separate contractors from the kits provided in the same way as with other Fairmile craft and numbered "LCS(L)(2) 251" to "LCS(L)(2) 260". Three of these were war losses – 252, 256 and 258.

- LCS(L)(2) 251 – Austins of East Ham, Twinn Wharf, Barking.
- LCS(L)(2) 252 – Solent Shipyards, Bursledon Bridge, Sarisbury Green.
- LCS(L)(2) 253 – H. T. Percival, Horning, Norfolk.
- LCS(L)(2) 254 – A. M. Dickie & Sons. Bangor, North Wales.
- LCS(L)(2) 255 – Brooke Marine, Oulton Broad, Lowestoft.
- LCS(L)(2) 256 – John Sadd & Sons, Maldon, Essex.
- LCS(L)(2) 257 – Austins of East Ham, Twinn Wharf, Barking.
- LCS(L)(2) 258 – Solent Shipyards, Bursledon Bridge, Sarisbury Green.
- LCS(L)(2) 259 – H. T. Percival, Horning, Norfolk.
- LCS(L)(2) 260 – Austins of East Ham, Twinn Wharf, Barking.

The usual Fairmile construction techniques were used with all items prefabricated and supplied in kit form to boatyards for assembly and fitting out.

== See also ==
- Fairmile A motor launch
- Fairmile B motor launch
- Fairmile C motor gun boat
- Fairmile D motor torpedo boat
