= Fairmile A motor launch =

WWII Royal Navy motor boat

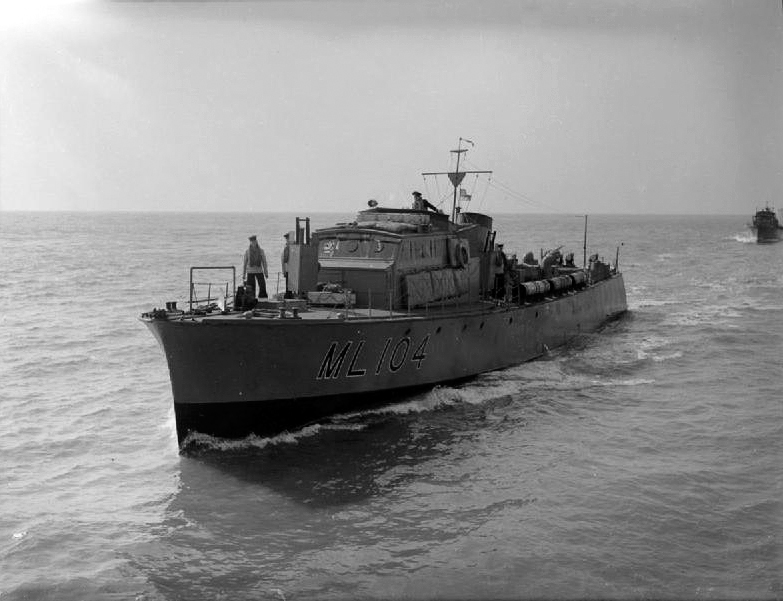
- The Fairmile A motor launch ML104 carrying depth charges as an A/S escort or sub-chaser in 1941 at Dover, England

Class overview
- Name: Fairmile A motor launch
- Succeeded by: Fairmile B motor launch
- Planned: 25
- Completed: 12, numbered from ML100 to ML111
- Canceled: 13 (completed to Type B design instead)
- Lost: 4
- Retired: 8

General characteristics
- Displacement: 57 tons, not including armament and equipment
- Length: 110 ft (34 m)
- Beam: 17 ft 5 in (5.31 m)
- Draught: 4 ft 6 in (1.37 m) forward, 6 ft 6 in (1.98 m) aft
- Propulsion: 3 Hall-Scott Defender V12 petrol engines 600 hp
- Speed: 25 knots (46 km/h; 29 mph) at 2,200 rpm
- Range: 600 mi (520 nmi; 970 km) at 12 knots (22 km/h; 14 mph)
- Complement: 16, including 2 officers
- Sensors & processing systems: ASDIC
- Armament: one QF 3 pounder Hotchkiss gun one pair of 0.303 in. Lewis machine guns 12 depth charges

The Fairmile A motor launch was a coastal motor launch designed by Norman Hart for the Fairmile Marine for the Royal Navy in World War II. The prototype ML 100 was privately built by the British industrialist Noel Macklin, who placed an order for this craft on 27 July 1939 with Woodnut's boatyard at St Helens. The Admiralty placed an order for a series of 25 boats to this design on 22 September, including the prototype under construction. The twelve boats completed to this initial design were numbered ML 100 to ML 111, while the thirteen other boats ordered on 22 September were re-ordered to the Admiralty's own Fairmile B design.

== Development ==
Shortly before the Second World War the British industrialist Noel Macklin submitted to the Admiralty an innovative plan for the series production of a motor launch (vessels for harbour defence and submarine chasing). The design used prefabricated parts, which allowed various small concerns, such as furniture and piano manufacturers, to produce the individual components. These components could then be assembled in separate shipyards. The hull was to be made of plywood frames divided into nine watertight compartments, with double diagonal mahogany planking forming the outer skin.

The final design was a 110-foot, hard-chine boat of planing form, optimised for speed at the expense of range as befitted the intended coastal sub-chaser role, although the turning circle would be larger than hoped for as a result of the hard chines. The cabin was located well forward, leaving a large working space aft for the handling of depth charges and guns. The Admiralty rejected the concept, and so the prototype was built as a private venture. In July 1939, two months before the outbreak of war, the Admiralty had a change of heart and purchased the prototype. Following the outbreak of war, they awarded Macklin's Fairmile Marine company a contract on 22 September to have built twenty-four further Type A Fairmiles, using a variety of separate shipyards. While these launches were on order, an improved Type B design came from Bill Holt, head of the Admiralty's DNC Boat Section. The hard-chine hull of the Type A had exhibited seakeeping and handling limitations, but Holt's round-bilged design for the Type B was a far more seaworthy form. Thus Fairmile was instructed to complete the last thirteen of the order (ML 112 to ML 124) to the new variant design, so that only twelve Type A (including the prototype) were completed.

== Boats ==
Name	Ship Builder	Completed	Fate
ML 100	Woodnutt & Co., St Helens, Isle of Wight	19 May 1940	Sold in October 1947.
ML 101	James A. Silver, Rosneath, Dunbartonshire	28 May 1940	Sold in November 1947 as Firebird.
ML 102	Woodnutt & Co., St Helens, Isle of Wight	15 June 1940	Sold in August 1947 as yacht Carlyle.
ML 103	Brooke Marine, Oulton Broad, Lowestoft	28 June 1940	Sunk by mine 24 August 1942 in the Dover Straits.
ML 104	A. M. Dickie & Sons, Bangor, Gwynedd	28 June 1940	Sold in 1947.
ML 105	Frank Curtis, Looe, Cornwall	8 July 1940	Sold in May 1946.
ML 106	Alex Robertson (Yachtbuilders) & Sons, Sandbank, Argyll	5 July 1940	Sold in January 1947.
ML 107	Sussex Shipbuilding, Shoreham-by-Sea, Sussex	30 June 1940	Sold in August 1947.
ML 108	James N. Miller & Sons, East Shore, St Monance, Fife	4 July 1940	Sunk by mine 5 September 1943 in the Channel.
ML 109	William Osbourne, Littlehampton, Sussex	1 August 1940	Sunk by mine 30 October 1940 off the Humber.
ML 110	Aldous Successors, The Shipyard, Brightlingsea	24 July 1940	Sold in August 1947.
ML 111	James A. Silver, Rosneath, Dunbartonshire	27 July 1940	Sunk by mine 25 November 1940 off the Humber.

== Service ==
Fairmile A motor launch

The first vessel (ML100) was not completed until May 1940 because of handling problems at low speeds, although the subsequent boats had all entered service by July. Their role was to be anti-submarine escorts in coastal waters, but, once the better Fairmile B motor launches began to enter service in the autumn of 1940, the Type A boats were converted to minelayers.

== See also ==
- Fairmile B motor launch
- Fairmile C motor gun boat
- Fairmile D motor torpedo boat
- Fairmile H landing craft
- Coastal Forces of the Royal Navy
