= Fairmile B motor launch =

WWII Royal Navy motor boat

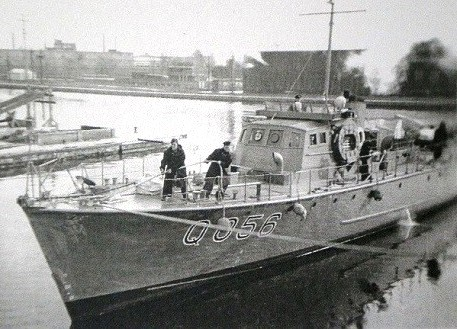
- The Canadian Fairmile B motor launch ML-Q056 in 1941

Class overview
- Name: Fairmile B motor launch
- Preceded by: Fairmile A motor launch
- Succeeded by: Fairmile C motor gun boat
- Completed: c. 650

General characteristics
- Displacement: 85 tons
- Length: 112 ft (34 m)
- Beam: 18 ft 3 in (5.56 m); except Canadian built at 17 ft (5.2 m) or 17 ft 10 in (5.44 m)
- Draught: 4 ft 10 in (1.47 m)
- Propulsion: Two 650 bhp (480 kW) Hall-Scott Defender petrol engines
- Speed: 20 knots (37 km/h; 23 mph)
- Range: 1,500 mi (1,300 nmi; 2,400 km) at 12 kn (22 km/h; 14 mph)
- Complement: 16 (later increased)
- Sensors & processing systems: ASDIC
- Armament: (for 1940 Sub Chaser); 1 × QF 3-pounder Hotchkiss; 1 × twin 0.303 in machine guns; 12 depth charges; later(some vessels): 1 × QF 3-pounder Hotchkiss; 2 × twin 0.303 in machine guns; 1 × Oerlikon 20 mm cannon; 1 × Bofors 40 mm gun
- Armour: Wheelhouse plated

The Fairmile B motor launch (often abbreviated to 'ML') was a very numerous class of motor launch produced in kit form by British boatbuilder Fairmile Marine, and then assembled and fitted out by numerous boatyards during the Second World War to meet the Royal Navy's coastal operation requirements.

== Design ==
While the Type A motor launch had been designed entirely for Fairmile by architect Norman Hart, the Type B design had come from Bill Holt, head of the Admiralty's DNC Boat Section. The hard-chine hull of the Type A had exhibited seakeeping and handling limitations, but Holt's round-bilged design for the Type B was found to be a far more seaworthy form.

Like all Fairmile boats, production of the Type B was based on total prefabrication so individual components could be contracted out to small factories for production and these arranged as kits that would be delivered in stages to various boatyards for assembly & fitting out on a 'just-in-time' basis. Accordingly, the detailed design work for the Type B was taken on by Fairmile and modified to suit their kit fabrication principle - they then also handled production of component parts.

Altogether approximately 650 boats were built between 1940 and 1945. Like the Type As, the Type Bs were initially intended as submarine chasers, so the boats were fitted with ASDIC (sonar) as standard.

Their main armament initially reflected their anti-submarine focus, with 12 depth charges, a single QF 3-pounder Hotchkiss gun forward, and one set of twin 0.303-in Lewis or GO machine guns (frequently increased in number by the crew); early boats often received a Holman projector amidships. A common upgrade to gun armament by 1942–43 in many early boats was to add an aft bandstand mounting for either a 2-pdr Rolls gun or a 20mm Oerlikon cannon. The specifications given are for the original 1940 British version.

As the war moved on, the vessels were adapted to other roles and the armament was modified and upgraded such as the replacement of the 3-pounder with one or more 20 mm Oerlikon cannon and removal of the ASDIC dome for more clearance as minesweepers. Some boats were configured as motor torpedo boats.

== Boats ==
The Fairmile B type superseded the original Fairmile A type, which had been designed by Norman Hart.

=== First batch (September 1939 orders) ===
An initial batch of 24 of these (ML 101 to ML 124) was ordered by the Admiralty as part of its first emergency war programme on 22 September 1939 from the Fairmile Marine company, of which the first eleven (plus the prototype ML 100) were completed to the Hart design (see Fairmile A motor launch); the remaining thirteen (ML 112 to ML 124) were completed to the new Fairmile B design. The first Fairmile B motor launch (actually ML 113 from Tough Bros, Teddington) was completed and delivered on 12 August 1940, with a further eleven from this first production batch entering service before the end of the year (the last of the batch to be completed - ML 123 - was delayed until 1941).

Name	Ship Builder	Completed	Fate
ML 112	Woodnutt & Co., St Helens, Isle of Wight	22 September 1940	Sold on 27 February 1946.
ML 113	Tough Brothers, Teddington	12 August 1940	Sold in March 1946 as Pendennis.
ML 114	Brooke Marine, Oulton Broad, near Lowestoft	24 August 1940	For disposal in 1946.
ML 115	Solent Shipyard, Sareisbury Green, Hants.	18 September 1940	Sold in October 1946.
ML 116	A. M. Dickie & Sons, Tarbert, Argyllshire	14 September 1940	For disposal in April 1946.
ML 117	Lady Bee, Isleworth	26 October 1940	Sold in 1946, becoming yacht Savourna by 1959.
ML 118	Sussex Shipbuilding, Shoreham-by-Sea, Sussex	7 October 1940	Sold in 1946 as Marandis.
ML 119	Alexander Robertson, Sandbank.	12 September 1940	Lent to South African Navy 1945; for disposal later in 1945.
ML 120	Aldous Successors, The Shipyard, Brightlingsea	8 October 1940	Sold 1946 as Onetwenty.
ML 121	James A. Silver, Rosneath, Dunbartonshire	12 September 1940	Sold in Egypt ca. 1947.
ML 122	A. M. Dickie & Sons, Bangor, Gwynedd	16 October 1940	Lent to Royal Norwegian Navy from 13 December 1940 to 23 August 1941; for disposal in October 1945.
ML 123	Frank Curtis, Looe, Cornwall	May 1941	To Free French Navy as St Ronan from May 1941 to July 1942; sold 1946.
ML 124	A. M. Dickie & Sons, Tarbert, Argyllshire	13 November 1940	To Ship Target Trials in 1946; for disposal in October 1947.

=== Second batch (January 1940 orders) ===
The Admiralty placed a massive order for a second batch of Fairmile Bs - 120 vessels in total - on 8 January 1940. These were numbered ML 125 to ML 244. Of these, 37 were delivered by the end of 1940, another 77 during the first half of 1941, and the last 6 during the second half of 1941.

Name	Ship Builder	Completed	Fate
ML 125	J. S. Doig (Grimsby), Grimsby Docks	9 November 1940	Lent to Royal Norwegian Navy from 23 December 1940 to 23 August 1941; for disposal in October 1945.
ML 126	James N. Miller & Sons, East Shore, St Monance, Fife	19 September 1940	Sunk 27 November 1943 after torpedo attack by U-boat.
ML 127	Brooke Marine, Oulton Broad, near Lowestoft	7 November 1940	Mined on 22 November 1940 in the Thames Estuary.
ML 128	P. K. Harris & Sons, New Quay Dry Docks, Appledore, Devon	October 1940	Lent to Royal Norwegian Navy from 13 December 1940 to 23 August 1941; for disposal in January 1946.
ML 129	Mashford Brothers, Cremyll Yard, Cremyll, Plymouth, Devon	14 October 1940	Sunk by bombing on 22 March 1942 off Algeria.
ML 130	Frank Curtis, Looe, Cornwall	9 October 1940	Sunk off Malta on 7 May 1942 by gunfire from E-boats.
ML 131	Frank Curtis, Looe, Cornwall	12 December 1941	Sold in March 1947.
ML 132	Itchenor Shipyard	9 November 1940	Became constructive total loss by bombing on 21 March 1942 at Bone (Annaba), Algeria, and interned on next day.
ML 133	Lady Bee, Isleworth	12 December 1940	Lost on 11 May 1943 by fire off west coast of Scotland.
ML 134	Solent Shipyard, Sarisbury Green	29 October 1940	For disposal in October 1946; became Egyptian Hamza.
ML 135	Dorset Yacht, Hamworthy	10 October 1940	Lent to South African Navy 1945; sold at Malta in November 1946.
ML 136	Alexander Robertson, Sandbank.	26 November 1940	Sold in Holland in March 1947, becoming Y861.
ML 137	Boat Construction Company, Falmouth, Cornwall.	26 November 1940	For disposal in October 1945.
ML 138	Aldous Successors, The Shipyard, Brightlingsea	19 November 1940	Lent to Royal Netherlands Navy from 10 November 1945 until 1953, then sold.
ML 139	Frank Curtis, Looe, Cornwall	17 December 1940	For disposal in October 1945.
ML 140	Frank Curtis, Looe, Cornwall	31 January 1941	For disposal in October 1945.
ML 141	Mashford Brothers, Cremyll Yard, Cremyll, Plymouth, Devon	23 December 1940	For disposal in October 1945.
ML 142	Brooke Marine, Oulton Broad, near Lowestoft	26 November 1940	Sold 1946, becoming Tregarth.
ML 143	Frank Curtis, Looe, Cornwall	13 February 1941	Lent to Royal Netherlands Navy from 10 November 1945 until 10 April 1946, then sold as Gay Tulip.
ML 144	Dorset Yacht, Hamworthy	12 November 1940	Sunk by mine on 22 September 1941 in the Channel.
ML 145	Frank Curtis, Looe, Cornwall	25 March 1941	Became ML(A)1 from July 1945, sold 1946.
ML 146	Frank Curtis, Looe, Cornwall	1 March 1941	For disposal in October 1945.
ML 147	Brooke Marine, Oulton Broad, near Lowestoft	December 1940	Constructive tptal loss on 3 November 1944 off Portsmouth; for disposal in April 1945.
ML 148	Sussex Shipbuilding, Shoreham-by-Sea, Sussex	10 December 1940	Became ML(A)2 from July 1945, sold 1946.
ML 149	Vosper & Company, Portsmouth	20 February 1941	Became ML(A)3 from July 1945, sold 1946.
ML 150	Sheerness Dockyard	6 March 1941	Sold March 1948.
ML 151	Sheerness Dockyard	25 February 1941	For disposal in October 1945.
ML 152	P. K. Harris & Sons, New Quay Dry Docks, Appledore	18 December 1940	Became ML(A)4 from July 1945, for disposal in June 1946.
ML 153	H. J. Percival, Horning, Norfolk	19 January 1941	For disposal in July 1946, becoming yacht Ginasal.
ML 154	James A. Silver, Rosneath, Dunbartonshire	5 November 1940	Became ML2154, then Squirrel in 1956, taken to pieces in June 1958.
ML 155	Woodnutt, Bembridge, Isle of Wight	11 December 1940	Became ML2155, sold 1961.
ML 156	Wallasea Bay Yacht Yard, Rochford, Essex	18 December 1940	Scuttled at St Nazaire on 28 March 1942, salved and became ML2156, sold 1951.
ML 157	John I. Thorneycroft & Company, Hampton, London	9 October 1940	Sold February 1946.
ML 158	John I. Thorneycroft & Company, Hampton	5 May 1941	Sold 27 February 1946.
ML 159	James N. Miller & Sons, East Shore, St Monance, Fife	23 November 1940	Sold February 1946.
ML 160	Alexander Robertson, Sandbank.	27 December 1940	Bombed on 6 May 1942 at Brixham.
ML 161	Frank Curtis, Looe, Cornwall	10 April 1941	To Royal Netherlands Navy from 4 January 1945 to 28 August 1946; sold in 1946.
ML 162	A. M. Dickie & Sons, Bangor, North Wales	3 December 1940	To Royal Netherlands Navy from 4 January 1945 to 10 April 1946; sold September 1946.
ML 163	Leo Robinson, Oulton Broad, Lowestoft	12 February 1941	Sold in 1947, becoming Armanda.
ML 164	Boat Construction Company, Falmouth, Cornwall.	18 December 1940	To Royal Netherlands Navy from 4 January 1945 to 10 April 1946; sold September 1946.
ML 165	Kris Cruisers, Riverside Yard, Isleworth, London.	10 December 1940	For disposal in October 1946.
ML 166	J. W. & A. Upham, Brixham	1 January 1941	To War Department as Hambledon in January 1945; for disposal in May 1947.
ML 167	J. W. & A. Upham, Brixham	January 1941	To War Department as Iffley in January 1945; for disposal in May 1947.
ML 168	William Weatherhead, Cockenzie	23 November 1940	For disposal in May 1946.
ML 169	William King, Burnham-on-Crouch, Essex	27 November 1940	Lost by fire on 15 February 1942 at Gibraltar.
ML 170	Aldous Successors, The Shipyard, Brightlingsea	January 1941	For disposal in May 1946.
ML 171	Tough Brothers, Teddington	21 October 1940	To War Department as Richmond in June 1945; for disposal in May 1947.
ML 172	Frank Curtis, Looe, Cornwall	16 March 1941	For disposal in May 1946.
ML 173	Frank Curtis, Looe, Cornwall	17 January 1941	For disposal in May 1946.
ML 174	William Osbourne, Littlehampton	December 1940	For disposal in May 1946.
ML 175	James A. Silver, Rosneath, Dunbartonshire	20 January 1941	For disposal in May 1946.
ML 176	Solent Shipyard, Sarisbury Green	December 1940	For disposal in May 1946.
ML 177	Wallasea Bay Yacht Yard, Rochford, Essex	December 1940	Lost at St Nazaire on 28 March 1942.
ML 178	Leo Robinson, Tewkesbury	24 June 1941	Sold in 1946.
ML 179	J. W. & A. Upham, Brixham	16 February 1941	Sold in February 1946.
ML 180	Collins Pleasurecraft Company, Oulton Broad, Lowestoft	18 February 1941	Sold in 1948 as Matapan.
ML 181	John Sadd, Maldon, Essex	24 January 1941	Lent to Royal Netrherlands Navy in 1945, then sold to them in March 1947.
ML 182	Leo Robinson, Tewkesbury	2 August 1941	Free French Navy from 1 April 1942 to 12 August 1942, sold in February 1946.
ML 183	A. M. Dickie & Sons, Tarbert, Argyllshire	10 February 1941	Lost in collision with East Pier, Dieppe on 11 February 1945.
ML 184	P. K. Harris & Sons, New Quay Dry Docks, Appledore, Devon	10 February 1941	Sold in March 1946.
ML 185	James Taylor, Chertsey	20 May 1941	Sold in March 1946.
ML 186	Brooke Marine, Oulton Broad, near Lowestoft	28 January 1941	Sold in March 1946.
ML 187	Boat Construction Company, Falmouth, Cornwall.	11 February 1941	Sold 11 June 1947 at Singapore.
ML 188	A. M. Dickie & Sons, Tarbert, Argyllshire	25 March 1941	For disposal November 1945 at Freetown.
ML 189	Dorset Yacht, Hamworthy.	4 February 1941	Sold 11 June 1947 at Singapore.
ML 190	Solent Shipyard, Sarisbury Green	19 March 1941	For disposal in October 1945.
ML 191	Itchenor Shipyard	15 May 1941	To Burma RNVR in November 1945; for disposal in June 1946.
ML 192	Southampton Steam Joinery, Southampton	1 August 1941	To Free French Navy in 1942; lost at St Nazaire on 28 March 1942.
ML 193	H. J. Percival, Horning, Norfolk.	27 March 1941	Sold 11 June 1947 at Singapore.
ML 194	Johnson & Jago, Leigh-on-Sea, Essex.	29 January 1941	Sold 11 June 1947 at Singapore.
ML 195	John I. Thorneycroft & Company, Hampton, London	21 January 1941	Sold March 1947.
ML 196	James N. Miller & Sons, East Shore, St Monance, Fife	1 February 1941	Became ML2196; to Norwich Sea Cadets in 1958 as Lord Nelson.
ML 197	Alexander Robertson, Sandbank.	24 February 1941	Sold 1946 as Cory 3.
ML 198	Woodnutt, Bembridge, Isle of Wight	18 March 1941	Sold 1946 as Cory 4.
ML 199	Tough Brothers, Teddington	19 December 1940	Sold in August 1946.
ML 200	James A. Silver, Rosneath, Dunbartonshire	22 February 1941	For disposal in January 1946 at Trincomalee.
ML 201	James A. Silver, Rosneath, Dunbartonshire	27 March 1941	Sold 11 June 1947 at Singapore.
ML 202	Lady Bee, Isleworth	15 March 1941	Sold in February 1946 at Trincomalee.
ML 203	James N. Miller & Sons, East Shore, St Monance, Fife	24 June 1941	For disposal in October 1945.
ML 204	Risdon Beazley, Northam Bridge	27 February 1941	To Burma RNVR on 1 November 1945; for disposal in 1946.
ML 205	James Taylor, Chertsey	28 June 1941	To Free French Navy as Ouessant from May to August 1942; for disposal 1946.
ML 206	Aldous Successors, The Shipyard, Brightlingsea	5 March 1941	Sold to Hampton Sea Scouts in October 1946.
ML 207	Johnson & Jago, Leigh-on-Sea, Essex.	11 March 1941	Sold in March 1946.
ML 208	Risdon Beazley, Northam Bridge	12 March 1941	To Royal Norwegian Navy from 12 March 1941 until October 1942; for disposal in October 1945.
ML 209	James Taylor, Chertsey	25 August 1941	For disposal in November 1945 at Freetown.
ML 210	William Osbourne, Littlehampton	7 April 1941	To Royal Norwegian Navy from 5 April 1941; mined 15 February 1944 off Dieppe.
ML 211	Brooke Marine, Oulton Broad, near Lowestoft	3 March 1941	Sold 1947.
ML 212	A. M. Dickie & Sons, Bangor, North Wales	5 March 1941	Sold 1946, becoming yacht Yvonne II.
ML 213	Mashford Brothers, Cremyll Yard, Cremyll, Plymouth, Devon	11 April 1941	For disposal in November 1945.
ML 214	Kris Cruisers, Riverside Yard, Isleworth, London.	10 March 1941	Sold 11 June 1947 at Singapore.
ML 215	Cardnel Brothers, Maylandsea, Tilthorne, near Chelmsford.	7 May 1941	Sold 1947.
ML 216	Lady Bee, Isleworth	28 May 1941	Mined 19 September 1944 and foundered 28 September in the North Sea.
ML 217	A. M. Dickie & Sons, Tarbert, Argyllshire	May 1941	Became ML 2217, later to Nigeria as Sapele on 20 July 1959.
ML 218	William Weatherhead, Cockenzie	17 May 1941	For disposal in September 1945.
ML 219	William Osbourne, Littlehampton	December 1940	Grounded near Stornoway 21 November 1941, became Constructive Total Loss.
ML 220	Tough Brothers, Teddington	February 1941	Became ML 2220, to RNVR in December 1947, sold 20 August 1958.
ML 221	William King, Burnham-on-Crouch, Essex	24 February 1941	Became ML 2221, to Connah's Quay Sea Cadet Corps in 1958.
ML 222	J. S. Doig (Grimsby), Grimsby Docks	20 April 1941	Became ML 2222, for disposal in 1956.
ML 223	Alexander Robertson, Sandbank.	May 1941	Became ML6002, later ML 2223; to Nigeria in July 1959 as Calabar.
ML 224	Bay Yacht, Wallasea.	13 March 1941	For disposaL in March 1946.
ML 225	Aldous Successors, The Shipyard, Brightlingsea	25 April 1941	To War Department in June 1945 as Maple Durham, but conversion not completed and disposed of in October 1945.
ML 226	Boat Construction Company, Falmouth, Cornwall.	8 April 1941	For disposal in November 1945 at Freetown.
ML 227	Austins of East Ham Ltd, Twinn Wharf, Barking	21 May 1941	Sold 1947 as Syrinx.
ML 228	Tough Brothers, Teddington	15 April 1941	For disposal in November 1945 at Freetown.
ML 229	Dorset Yacht, Hamworthy.	7 April 1941	For disposal in November 1945.
ML 230	Brooke Marine, Oulton Broad, near Lowestoft	28 March 1941	Sunk in collision in Indian waters on 17 August 1945.
ML 231	Sussex Shipbuilding, Shoreham-by-Sea, Sussex	19 May 1941	For disposal in November 1945 at Freetown.
ML 232	James A. Silver, Rosneath, Dunbartonshire	April 1941	To Greece in July 1945 on loan as Domakos; broken up in 1946.
ML 233	P. K. Harris & Sons, New Quay Dry Docks, Appledore, Devon	31 March 1941	Lent to Royal Norwegian Navy from 31 March to 23 August 1941; for disposal in October 1945.
ML 234	A. M. Dickie & Sons, Tarbert, Argyllshire	15 September 1941	To War Department in June 1945 as Marlow, but conversion not completed and disposed of in October 1945.
ML 235	A. M. Dickie & Sons, Bangor, North Wales	27 May 1941	Sold in 1946, becoming yacht Pauline.
ML 236	J. W. & A. Upham, Brixham	9 June 1941	For disposal in February 1946.
ML 237	J. W. & A. Upham, Brixham	22 May 1941	Became ML2237; sunk as gunnery target on 8 October 1952.
ML 238	Alexander Robertson, Sandbank.	14 November 1941	To Italian Navy 7 January 1946.
ML 239	Solent Shipyard, Sarisbury Green	22 May 1941	To War Department in June 1945 as Marsh, but conversion not completed and disposed of in October 1945.
ML 240	Thomson & Balfour, Victoria Saw Mills, Bo'ness	22 May 1941	To Italian Navy 7 January 1946.
ML 241	Frank Curtis, Looe, Cornwall	19 May 1941	For disposal in January 1945.
ML 242	Frank Curtis, Looe, Cornwall	28 May 1941	Constructive Total Loss by fire 29 November 1942 in West Africa.
ML 243	William Weatherhead, Cockenzie	26 May 1941	For disposal in January 1946.
ML 244	H. J. Percival, Horning, Norfolk	3 July 1941	To France on 16 August 1944 as V101.

=== Third batch (May 1940 orders) ===
An order for a third batch, this time of 65 boats, was placed on 21 May 1940; these were numbered ML 245 to ML 309, and were all delivered during 1941, as were two extra units (ML 310 and ML 311) ordered on 28 June 1940 for Singapore to be assembled by the Singapore Harbour Board; this last pair were delivered to Singapore on 29 November 1941, only to be lost in February 1942 to the Japanese (who re-used ML 310 under the name Suikei 12).

Name	Ship Builder	Completed	Fate
ML 245	Sheerness Dockyard	14 July 1941	To Free French Navy as St Guenole from July 1941 to July 1942; sold 11 June 1947 at Singapore.
ML 246	Sheerness Dockyard	21 July 1941	To Free French Navy as St Ives from July 1941 to July 1942; to Burmese RNVR in November 1945; for disposal in January 1946.
ML 247	J. W. & A. Upham, Brixham	19 July 1941	To Free French Navy as St Alain from July 1941 to July 1942; to Burmese RNVR in November 1945; for disposal in January 1946.
ML 248	Brooke Marine, Oulton Broad, near Lowestoft	April 1941	Became ML2248; sold 3 July 1954.
ML 249	Wallasea Bay Yacht Station, Rochford, Essex	27 April 1941	To War Department in June 1945 as Molesey, but conversion not completed and disposed of in October 1945.
ML 250	Frank Curtis, Looe, Cornwall	19 May 1941	Became ML2250; sold 1962.
ML 251	Frank Curtis, Looe, Cornwall	19 May 1941	Lost in collision in the Atlantic 6 March 1943.
ML 252	Southampton Steam Joinery, Southampton	17 February 1941	Sold 1946, becoming yacht Cheriton.
ML 253	John Sadd, Maldon, Essex	5 May 1941	For disposal in October 1945.
ML 254	J. W. & A. Upham, Brixham	8 May 1941	For disposal in October 1945.
ML 255	Mashford Brothers, Cremyll Yard, Cremyll, Plymouth, Devon	18 July 1941	For disposal in December 1945.
ML 256	Frank Curtis, Looe, Cornwall	25 June 1941	For disposal in April 1947.
ML 257	Frank Curtis, Looe, Cornwall	August 1941	For disposal in October 1945.
ML 258	Dorset Yacht, Hamworthy.	28 May 1941	Mined 15/16 September 1944 off Rimini; for disposal January 1945.
ML 259	Leo Robinson, Oulton Broad, Lowestoft	3 July 1941	Sold in July 1946.
ML 260	John I. Thorneycroft & Company, Hampton, London	22 May 1941	To Royal Netherlands Navy from 4 January 1945 to September 1946; for disposal September 1946.
ML 261	Boat Construction Company, Falmouth, Cornwall.	11 June 1941	For disposal at Freetown in November 1945.
ML 262	Collins Pleasurecraft Company, Oulton Broad, Lowestoft	18 June 1941	To Free French Navy 1941; lost 28 March 1942 at St Nazaire.
ML 263	P. K. Harris & Sons, New Quay Dry Docks, Appledore	10 June 1941	For disposal at Freetown November 1945.
ML 264	Johnson & Jago, Leigh-on-Sea, Essex.	20 May 1941	Sold in November 1946.
ML 265	Risdon Beazley, Northam Bridge	30 May 1941	Lost by fire at Freetown 1 July 1944.
ML 266	William King, Burnham-on-Crouch, Essex	19 May 1941	To France 16 August 1944 as V103 in 1946.
ML 267	Solent Shipyard, Sarisbury Green	25 July 1941	To Free French Navy 1941; lost 28 March 1942 at St Nazaire.
ML 268	Dorset Yacht, Hamworthy.	17 July 1941	To Free French Navy 1941; lost 28 March 1942 at St Nazaire.
ML 269	William Weatherhead, Cockenzie	28 July 1941	Free French Navy April to August 1942 as Beniquet; to Burma RNVR October 1945; for disposal in December 1945.
ML 270	Brooke Marine, Oulton Broad, near Lowestoft	26 June 1941	Scuttled 28 March 1942 at St Nazaire.
ML 271	Boat Construction Company, Falmouth, Cornwall.	14 July 1941	To France 16 August 1944 as V102.
ML 272	Wallasea Bay Yacht Station, Wallasea.	29 May 1941	For disposal at Freetown in November 1945.
ML 273	William Osbourne, Littlehampton	17 September 1941	To Italian Navy 24 January 1946.
ML 274	Johnson & Jago, Leigh-on-Sea, Essex.	16 June 1941	For disposal at Freetown in November 1945.
ML 275	Thomson & Balfour, Victoria Saw Mills, Bo'ness	26 June 1941	For disposal in October 1945.
ML 276	Frank Curtis, Par, Cornwall	12 September 1941	For disposal in October 1945.
ML 277	J. W. & A. Upham, Brixham	13 July 1941	For disposal at Freetown in November 1945.
ML 278	Aldous Successors, The Shipyard, Brightlingsea	7 October 1941	For disposal at Freetown in November 1945.
ML 279	P. K. Harris & Sons, New Quay Dry Docks, Appledore	July 1941	For disposal at Freetown in November 1945.
ML 280	Frank Curtis, Looe, Cornwall	September 1941	To Italian Navy 7 January 1946.
ML 281	Brooke Marine, Oulton Broad, near Lowestoft	19 July 1941	For disposal at Freetown in November 1945.
ML 282	Itchenor Shipyard	2 October 1941	Sold March 1946.
ML 283	H. J. Percival, Horning, Norfolk.	25 September 1941	To Italian Navy 10 December 1945.
ML 284	James A. Silver, Rosneath, Dunbartonshire	4 September 1941	Paid off 4 August 1945.
ML 285	Solent Shipyard, Sarisbury Green	18 September 1941	For disposal at Freetown in November 1945.
ML 286	J. S. Doig (Grimsby), Grimsby Docks	29 August 1941	For disposal in October 1945.
ML 287	Austins of East Ham Ltd, Twinn Wharf, Barking	23 August 1941	Lost by fire at Freetown 1 July 1944.
ML 288	Cardnel Brothers, Maylandsea, Tilthorne, near Chelmsford.	19 August 1941	Foundered off Hartlepool 11 October 1941.
ML 289	Wallasea Bay Yacht Station, Wallasea.	15 August 1941	For disposal at Freetown in November 1945.
ML 290	Brooke Marine, Oulton Broad, near Lowestoft	18 September 1941	Sold at Freetown in October 1945.
ML 291	William Osbourne, Littlehampton	30 September 1941	For disposal in October 1945.
ML 292	Mashford Brothers, Cremyll Yard, Cremyll, Plymouth, Devon	30 October 1941	Constructive total loss by mine 19 June 19443; paid off 3 July 1945.
ML 293	Dorset Yacht, Hamworthy.	10 September 1941	Paid off in August 1945.
ML 294	John Sadd, Maldon, Essex	25 August 1941	For disposal in October 1945.
ML 295	Frank Curtis, Looe, Cornwall	21 October 1941	To Greece as Doliana 1946–1952; became ML 2295; sold 25 January 1956.
ML 296	Dorset Yacht, Hamworthy.	8 October 1941	For disposal at Freetown in November 1945.
ML 297	J. W. & A. Upham, Brixham	10 September 1941	For disposal in January 1946.
ML 298	Dorset Yacht, Hamworthy.	21 November 1941	Lost 28 March 1942 at St Nazaire.
ML 299	Lady Bee, Isleworth	4 December 1941	Laid up September 1946.
ML 300	William Weatherhead, Cockenzie	30 September 1941	For disposal in October 1945.
ML 301	Aldous Successors, The Shipyard, Brightlingsea	2 December 1941	Lost by explosion at Freetown on 9 August 1942.
ML 302	William King, Burnham-on-Crouch, Essex	6 September 1941	To France 16 August 1944 as V104.
ML 303	James N. Miller & Sons, East Shore, St Monance, Fife	14 October 1941	Free French Navy April to August 1942; sold February 1946 at Trincomalee.
ML 304	P. K. Harris & Sons, New Quay Dry Docks, Appledore	8 October 1941	For disposal in October 1945.
ML 305	Johnson & Jago, Leigh-on-Sea, Essex.	September 1941	Sold at Freetown in January 1946.
ML 306	Solent Shipyard, Sarisbury Green	18 December 1941	Lost 28 March 1942 at St Nazaire, but recovered by Germans to become their RA9.
ML 307	Frank Curtis, Looe, Cornwall	7 November 1941	To Greece on loan as Doxaton 21 June 1945 to 1961; sold 7 April 1961.
ML 308	Frank Curtis, Looe, Cornwall	30 November 1941	Sold 1948 at Malta.
ML 309	J. W. & A. Upham, Brixham	16 November 1941	Sold 1946, becoming River Lady.
ML 310	Singapore Harbour Board	29 November 1941	Lost 15 February 1942 in Tjebia Islands, becoming Japanese Suikei 12.
ML 311	Singapore Harbour Board	29 November 1941	Lost 14 February 1942 by Japanese gunfire in Banka Strait.

=== Fourth batch (August 1940 orders) ===
The fourth batch of 24 boats was ordered on 28 July 1940 as ML 312 to ML 335. However, these were altered to be completed instead as Motor Gunboats, re-classed as Fairmile C motor gun boats, and the prefixes to their numbers changed from "ML" to "MGB", retaining the same numbers.

In their place, a new batch of 120 Fairmile B boats was ordered under the 1940 Supplemental Programme, 76 to be assembled in the UK and 44 abroad. Most were ordered on 21 August, with 6 further boats ordered 6 days later; these became ML 336 to ML 455.

The first 12 (ML 336 to ML 347) were for assembly in UK boatyards, the next 14 (ML 348 to ML 361) for assembly at Cairo, the next four for assembly by the Singapore Harbour Board (ML 362 to ML 365), two for assembly at Dar es Salaam (ML 366 and ML 367), two at Bermuda for the Royal Canadian Navy (ML 368 and ML 369), two in Jamaica for Caribbean service (ML 370 and ML 371, also on 27 August), four at Singapore (ML 372 to ML 377, although four of these were destroyed on the stocks in January 1942, while the last pair was switched to Bombay Dockyard on 22 February 1942 following the fall of Singapore).

Name	Ship Builder	Completed	Fate
ML 336	Boat Construction Company, Falmouth, Cornwall	12 September 1941	To Italian Navy on 3 December 1945.
ML 337	A. M. Dickie & Sons, Tarbert, Argyllshire	18 November 1941	Later renumbered ML 2337; sold 25 September 1956.
ML 338	Risdon Beazley, Clausentum Yard, Northam Bridge, Southampton	28 September 1941	Later renumbered ML 2338; sold 17 December 1955.
ML 339	Wallasea Bay Yacht Station, Wallasea.	16 October 1941	Torpedoed by E-boat off Cromer 7 October 1942.
ML 340	Leo Robinson, Tewkesbury	19 January 1942	Sold April 1947 at Malta.
ML 341	Collins Pleasurecraft Company, Oulton Broad, Lowestoft	27 October 1941	To Greece on loan as Drama 26 July 1945 – 1960; sold 26 November 1962 to break up.
ML 342	Johnson & Jago, Leigh-on-Sea, Essex.	10 October 1941	Became ML 2342; sold on 26 November 1962.
ML 343	John I. Thorneycroft & Company, Hampton, London	October 1941	For disposal October 1945.
ML 344	Brooke Marine, Oulton Broad, near Lowestoft	22 October 1941	Sold 1946, becoming Glen Tor.
ML 345	Diesel Constructors, Isleworth, London	30 March 1942	Sold 1946, becoming yacht Warrior Geraint.
ML 346	James N. Miller & Sons, East Shore, St Monance, Fife	November 1941	Sold 1946, becoming Merrie Golden Hind.
ML 347	Risdon Beazley, Clausentum Yard, Northam Bridge, Southampton	17 October 1941	Sold January 1947, becoming yacht Venturer.
ML 348	Thomas Cook, Cairo	26 May 1942	Sold January 1947.
ML 349	Thomas Cook, Cairo	2 June 1942	To Italian Navy on 7 January 1946.
ML 350	Thomas Cook, Cairo	15 August 1942	Sold January 1947.
ML 351	Thomas Cook, Cairo	September 1942	To Italian Navy on 14 January 1946.
ML 352	Anglo-American Nile Tourist Company, Cairo	9 June 1942	Sunk by bomb at Tobruk on 14 September 1942.
ML 353	Anglo-American Nile Tourist Company, Cairo	26 May 1942	Sunk by bomb at Tobruk on 14 September 1942.
ML 354	Anglo-American Nile Tourist Company, Cairo	19 May 1942	To Italian Navy 24 January 1946.
ML 355	Anglo-American Nile Tourist Company, Cairo	18 April 1942	To Italian Navy 10 December 1945.
ML 356	Anglo-American Nile Tourist Company, Cairo	10 July 1942	To Italian Navy 14 January 1946.
ML 357	Anglo-American Nile Tourist Company, Cairo	1 August 1942	Became ML 2357; to Bermondsey Sea Cadet Corps 1958; sold 1961.
ML 358	Anglo-American Nile Tourist Company, Cairo	September 1942	Lost off Leros 12 November 1943.
ML 359	Anglo-American Nile Tourist Company, Cairo	31 October 1942	To Italian Navy 18 December 1946.
ML 360	Anglo-American Nile Tourist Company, Cairo	December 1942	Became ML 2360; sold 18 March 1959.
ML 361	Anglo-American Nile Tourist Company, Cairo	January 1943	Greek Karpathos in 1945.
ML 378	Belmont Dock, Kingston, Jamaica	3 November 1942	To Royal Canadian Navy in November 1942; sold 1945 in Trinidad.
ML 379	Belmont Dock, Kingston, Jamaica	31 October 1942	To Royal Canadian Navy in November 1942; sold 1945 in Trinidad.
ML 380	Louw & Halvorsen, Capetown	September 1942	To Royal Indian Navy; sold 1947.
ML 381	Louw & Halvorsen, Capetown	October 1942	Sold October 1945 at Bombay to BU.
ML 382	Louw & Halvorsen, Capetown	November 1942	Sold October 1945 at Bombay to BU.
ML 383	Louw & Halvorsen, Capetown	28 November 1942	Sold October 1945 at Bombay to BU.
ML 384	Thomas Cook, Cairo	December 1942	To Italian Navy on 18 December 1945.
ML 385	Thomas Cook, Cairo	January 1943	Paid off at Alexandria on 16 June 1944.
ML 386	Anglo-American Nile Tourist Company, Cairo	27 April 1943	To Turkey on 2 July 1946 as AB1.
ML 387	Anglo-American Nile Tourist Company, Cairo	1 June 1943	Lost by internal explosion at Beirut on 5 March 1944.

Thirty-two units (ML 392 to ML 423 ) were ordered for Commonwealth forces, for assembly overseas. Eight units were ordered as ML 392 to ML 399 on 12 August 1941 for assembly in Canada (although these were all passed on to the United States Navy); twenty more units were ordered on 4 September 1941, twelve for assembly in New Zealand boatyards for the Royal New Zealand Navy (ML 400 to ML 411) and eight for assembly in Indian boatyards for the Royal Indian Navy (ML 412 to ML 419); and four more were ordered for assembly in Singapore, of which two (ML 420 and ML 421) were re-ordered on 12 January 1942, and two (ML 422 and ML 423) were re-ordered on 28 November 1941.

Name	Ship Builder	Completed	Fate
ML 392	Le Blanc Shipbuilding, Weymouth, Nova Scotia	26 September 1942	To U.S.N. in December 1942 as SC 1466; for disposal 30 January 1948.
ML 393	Le Blanc Shipbuilding, Weymouth, Nova Scotia	26 September 1942	To R.C.N. in June 1942, then to U.S.N. in December 1942 as SC 1467; sold 1949.
ML 394	Le Blanc Shipbuilding, Weymouth, Nova Scotia	1 October 1942	To U.S.N. in December 1942 as SC 1468; for disposal 20 January 1948.
ML 395	Le Blanc Shipbuilding, Weymouth, Nova Scotia	26 September 1942	To U.S.N. in December 1942 as SC 1469; for disposal 30 January 1948.
ML 396	Le Blanc Shipbuilding, Weymouth, Nova Scotia	23 October 1942	To U.S.N. in December 1942 as SC 1470; sold 13 February 1947.
ML 397	Le Blanc Shipbuilding, Weymouth, Nova Scotia	23 October 1942	To U.S.N. in December 1942 as SC 1471; for disposal 30 January 1948.
ML 398	Le Blanc Shipbuilding, Weymouth, Nova Scotia	5 December 1942	To U.S.N. in December 1942 as SC 1472; for disposal 4 March 1948.
ML 399	Le Blanc Shipbuilding, Weymouth, Nova Scotia	5 December 1942	To U.S.N. in December 1942 as SC 1473; for disposal 21 April 1948.
ML 400	Bailey, Auckland, New Zealand	18 November 1942	To R.N.Z.N. on 1 April 1944 as Kahu; sold 1947, becoming Dolphin.
ML 401	Bailey, Auckland, New Zealand	1 April 1943	To R.N.Z.N.; sold 1947, becoming yacht Mahurangi.
ML 402	Bailey, Auckland, New Zealand	November 1943	To R.N.Z.N.; sold 1947, becoming yacht Ngaroma.
ML 403	Associated Boat Builders, Auckland, New Zealand	21 October 1942	To R.N.Z.N.; sold 1947, becoming Tiare.
ML 404	Associated Boat Builders, Auckland, New Zealand	1 February 1943	To R.N.Z.N.; sold 1947, becoming Wailana.
ML 405	Associated Boat Builders, Auckland, New Zealand	May 1943	To R.N.Z.N.; sold 1947, becoming Marlyn.
ML 406	Associated Boat Builders, Auckland, New Zealand	July 1943	To R.N.Z.N.; sold 1947, becoming Rodney Farry.
ML 407	Shipbuilders Ltd, Auckland, New Zealand	8 March 1943	To R.N.Z.N.; sold 1947, becoming yacht Deborah Bay.
ML 408	Shipbuilders Ltd, Auckland, New Zealand	8 August 1943	To R.N.Z.N.; sold 1947, becoming yacht Karamana.
ML 409	Shipbuilders Ltd, Auckland, New Zealand	August 1943	To R.N.Z.N.; sold 1947, becoming Iris Moana; re-purchased 1953 retaining name (1961 ML 3570 or Maori); sold 1963.
ML 410	Voss Ltd, Auckland, New Zealand	January 1943	To R.N.Z.N.; sold 1947, becoming yacht La Reta.
ML 411	Voss Ltd, Auckland, New Zealand	20 December 1943	To R.N.Z.N. as ML 3571; renamed Kahu (ii) 1953, then Philomel 1961; sold 1965, becoming ferry.
ML 472	Solent Shipyard, Sarisbury Green	17 April 1942	For disposal in October 1945.
ML 473	William Weatherhead, Cockenzie	3 February 1942	For disposal in October 1945.
ML 474	India General Navigation, Calcutta	22 April 1943	To Royal Indian Navy; sold 1947.
ML 475	India General Navigation, Calcutta	10 May 1943	To Royal Indian Navy; sold 1947.
ML 476	Garden Reach, Calcutta	4 April 1942	To Royal Indian Navy; sold 1947.
ML 477	Garden Reach, Calcutta	December 1942	To Royal Indian Navy; sold 1947.

=== Fifth batch (1941 Programme orders) ===
Forty boats were ordered on 27 August 1941. The first twenty-three of these (ML 478 to ML 500) were for the Royal Navy, while seventeen (RML 511 to RML 527) were rescue launches for the Royal Air Force (the numbers 501 to 510 were allocated to large MTBs). An additional forty-eight boats were ordered on 28 November 1941 under a 1941 Supplementary Programme. Twenty-six of these were rescue launches for the RAF (RML 528 to RML 553) while another twenty-two boats (ML 554 to ML 575) were also ordered for the Navy.

Name	Ship Builder	Completed	Fate
ML 478	Thomson & Balfour, Bo'ness	January 1942	Greek Kalini (or Eleptheron) on loan in July 1946; sold 7 April 1946.
ML 479	Collins Pleasurecraft Company, Oulton Broad, Lowestoft	1 April 1942	Sold 1946 in Trinidad.
ML 480	Frank Curtis, Looe, Cornwall	6 February 1942	For disposal in April 1946 at Malta.
ML 481	Frank Curtis, Looe, Cornwall	9 April 1942	Sold 1946 in Trinidad.
ML 482	Austins of East Ham Ltd, Twinn Wharf, Barking	26 February 1942	Sold 1946 in Trinidad.
ML 483	James N. Miller & Sons, East Shore, St Monance, Fife	February 1942	Lent to Greek Navy 1946; for disposal in 1964.
ML 484	Solent Shipyard, Sarisbury Green	5 May 1942	Sold 1945 in Trinidad.
ML 485	Cardnel Brothers, Maylandsea, Tilthorne, near Chelmsford.	30 March 1942	Sold 1945 in Trinidad.
ML 486	Johnson & Jago, Leigh-on-Sea, Essex.	10 March 1942	Sold 1945 in Trinidad.
ML 487	Johnson & Jago, Leigh-on-Sea, Essex.	13 April 1942	Sold 1945 in Trinidad.
ML 488	Lady Bee, Isleworth	28 March 1942	To Hounslow Sea Cadet Corps in June 1946.
ML 489	James N. Miller & Sons, East Shore, St Monance, Fife	1 March 1942	Became ML 2489, sold 1961.
ML 490	Frank Curtis, Looe, Cornwall	17 March 1942	For disposal in October 1945.
ML 491	Boat Construction Company, Falmouth, Cornwall.	May 1942	Became ML 2491, sold 7 April 1961.
ML 492	Aldous Successors, The Shipyard, Brightlingsea	13 May 1942	Sold 1946, became Pride of Paignton.
ML 493	Frank Curtis, Looe, Cornwall	May 1942	Became ML 2493, sold 1956.
ML 494	Thomson & Balfour, Victoria Saw Mills, Bo'ness	19 March 1942	For disposal in September 1945.
ML 495	William Weatherhead, Cockenzie	May 1942	Chelsea Sea Cadet Corps Loyalty by 1957.
ML 496	Lady Bee, Isleworth	2 July 1942	Sold 20 January 1959.
ML 497	Southampton Steam Joinery, Southampton	July 1942	Sold 1947.
ML 498	Risdon Beazley, Northam Bridge	15 April 1942	Became Sea Eagle 1955; to Derry Sea Cadet Corps in November 1957; sold 20 September 1963.
ML 499	Risdon Beazley, Northam Bridge	May 1942	Sold 4 March 1946.
ML 500	A. M. Dickie & Sons, Tarbert, Argyllshire	July 1942	Sold 20 April 1946.

=== Sixth batch (1942 orders) ===
Further batches followed, producing ML 576 onwards, many assembled in Overseas yards, with a final total of about 650 boats of this Type eventually assembly worldwide, including 60 in Canada.

Twenty-five more boats (ML 576 to ML 600) were ordered on 18 May 1942.

All boats were essentially the same, although they could be adapted to serve in several roles by the expedient of having pre-drilled rails on their decks spaced to allow the fitting of various types of armaments. Although their armament initially reflected their main anti-submarine mission, nine of them were fitted with 21-inch (533 mm) torpedo tubes taken from ex-US Town-class destroyers; they formed the 2nd ML Flotilla tasked with anti-invasion duty, until the threat had passed.

== Service ==
During the Siege of Malta, they were used to sweep a narrow channel ahead of heavier minesweepers which widened the channel. The heavier minesweepers were initially the remnants of the Malta trawler force, then fleet minesweepers that arrived with a convoy from Gibraltar. The launches were able to pass over the mines whereas many trawler losses had been caused by the leading ship hitting a mine.

A number served in the St Nazaire Raid as assault transports, but their light construction meant that they suffered heavily; 12 B motor launches were lost in the action, out of 16 deployed.

During the Normandy landings a number of MLs were designated as navigation launches. These motor launches guided the landing craft onto the correct beaches. For this task the craft were fitted with splinter mats at the front for added protection. An Oerlikon 20 mm cannon was fitted amidships and a Bofors 40 mm gun was installed at the stern. Smoke canister apparatus was installed at the rear of the craft and the number of depth charges was reduced. See main picture above of ML303 in this configuration.

Many were built as rescue motor launches with small sickbays aft of the engine room coaming, and classified as RML (rescue motor launch). These were numbered in the series RML492 to RML500, and RML511 to RML553. Several more were converted to use as War Office ambulance launches with larger sickbays.

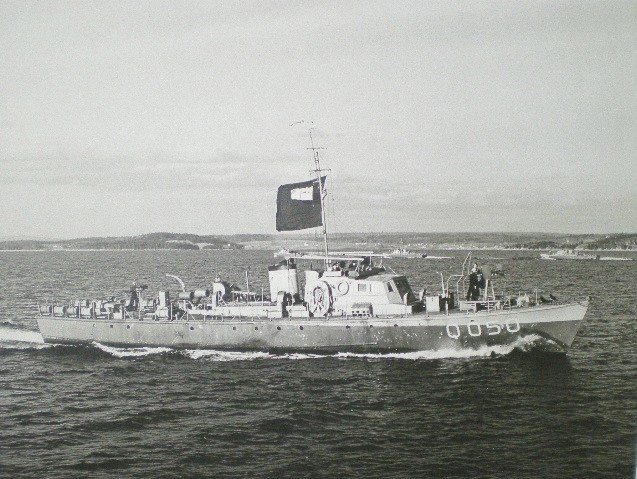
HMC ML Q055 1941. Large black flag indicates ASDIC contact.

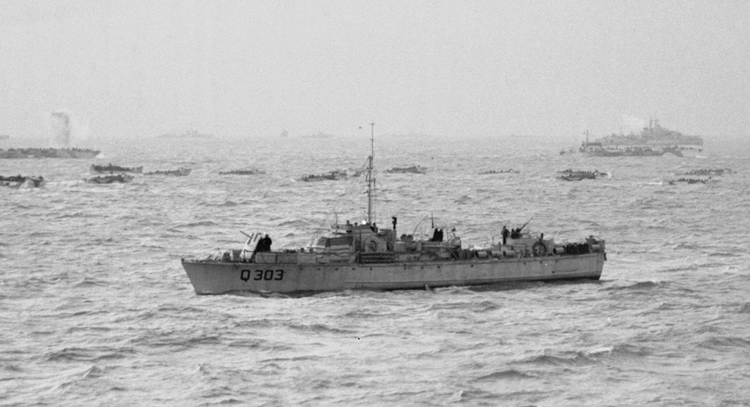
British ML303 during the invasion of Normandy on D-Day

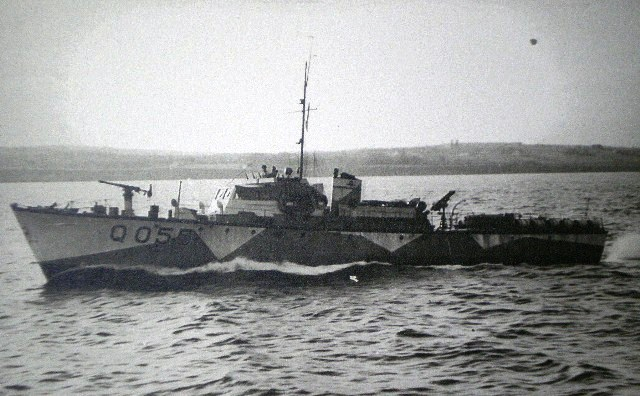
HMC ML Q055 1941

== British Colonial or Commonwealth-built Fairmile B motor launches ==
=== Canadian built Fairmiles ===
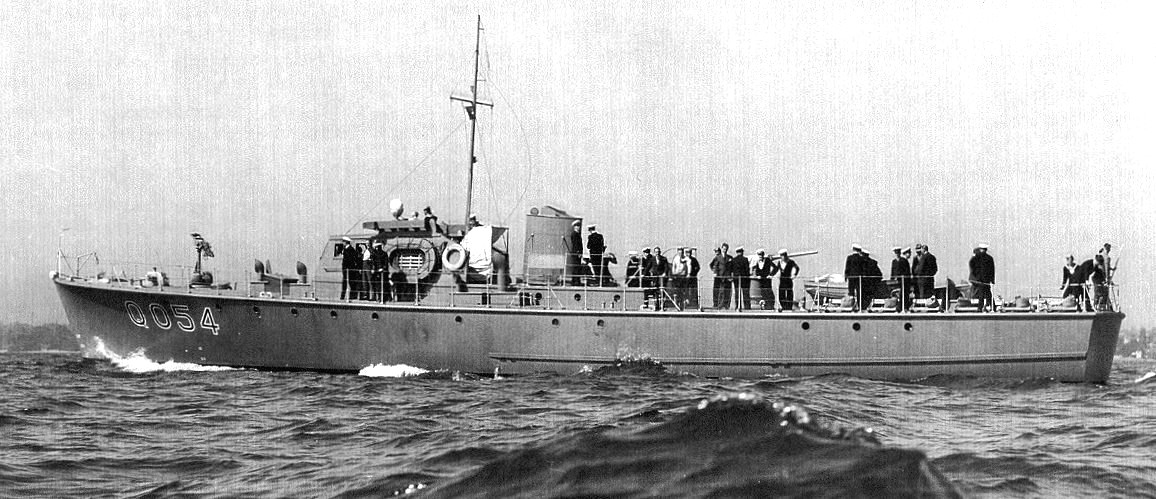
The Canadian Fairmile HMC ML Q054 in 1942

Originally designed for the Royal Navy (RN) by W.J. Holt of the Admiralty and built by British boat builder Fairmile Marine, during the Second World War, 88 Fairmile B motor launches, with slight modifications for Canadian climatic and operational conditions, were built in Canada for service with the RCN in home waters. The first thirty-six Canadian Fairmile B type were designated and painted up as CML 01 to 36 (coastal motor launch). Eight Canadian Fairmiles (Q392 – Q399) were built by Le Blanc for the RN and were transferred under Lend-Lease to the US Navy. The US Navy used the Canadian-built Fairmiles as submarine chasers (SC1466–1473).

=== Other British Colonial or Commonwealth built Fairmiles ===
At least two (ML 368 and ML 369) were built in the Imperial fortress colony of Bermuda, home to the base, dockyard and Admiralty house of the America and West Indies Station, by what was to become Burland, Conyers & Marirea, Ltd.

New Zealand ordered twelve boats on 4 September 1941, for assembly from the Fairmile kits by four boat builders in Auckland, of which the first two (MTB 403 and MTB 400) were delivered in October and November 1942 respectively and the following ten (MTB 401, MTB 402, and MTB 404 to MTB 411) during 1943. These were used in New Zealand waters and around the Solomon Islands, and included HMNZS Maori and HMNZS Kahu (Kahu (II). All were sold in 1947 except for MTB 411 (which became Kahu [II]).

In Australia 35 boats entered service from October 1942. They were employed on routine patrols, convoy escorts, running special forces in and out of Japanese-held areas, in Papua New Guinea, boom defence patrols in harbours at home and abroad, courier operations, survey work and raiding Japanese-held coasts. Of note the surrender of Japanese forces in the South West Pacific. On 10 September 1945, Rear-Admiral S. Sato, commanding officer of Kairiru and Muschu Islands, New Guinea, surrendered the Japanese forces on the islands to Major-General H. C. H. Robertson, commander of the 6th Division on board ML 805.

At least six boats (ML380–383, 829 and 846) were built by South Africa and commissioned during November 1942. These were sent as the 49th Fairmile Flotilla (SANF) to Burma and deployed along the Arakan coast. The boats saw much action in support of ground forces and disrupting Japanese supply lines.

The Imperial Japanese Navy salvaged two that had been sunk and placed them in service.

A number of boats were built in Egypt by Thomas Cook & Son, who had a Cairo shipyard for constructing Nile tourist craft. Armament was fitted in Port Said. The first three to enter service in 1942 were ML 355, 353 and 348. Post war they were often taken on as pleasure boats and a number of Fairmile Bs are on the National Register of Historic Vessels.

Fourteen Fairmile B were operated by the Italian Guardia di Finanza naval service, between 1947 and the 1980s.

== Surviving examples ==
Three currently survive in the United Kingdom, two of which are in excellent condition. One is RML497. Many others of the type are known to survive around the world, some still in commercial service as tour boats.

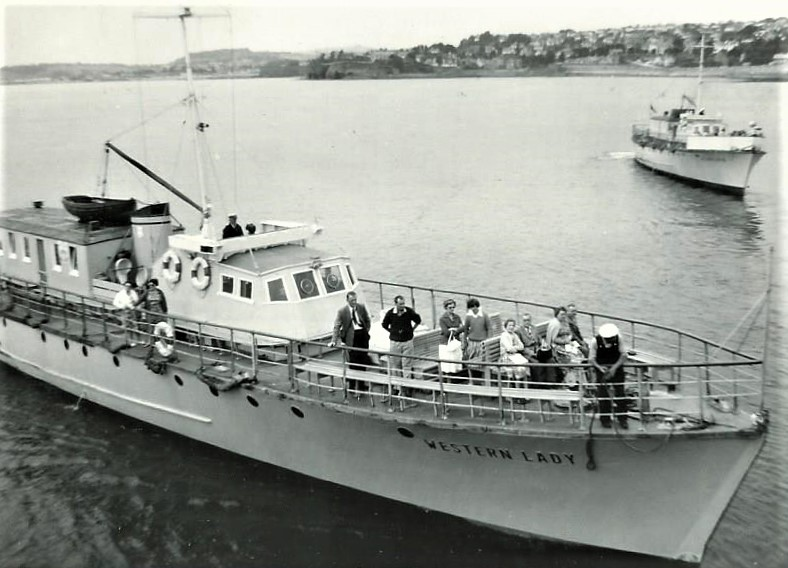
Fairmile B boat ML535 served with the 63rd ML Flotilla 1942-44. The picture shows her in 1962 after conversion to a ferry MV Western Lady

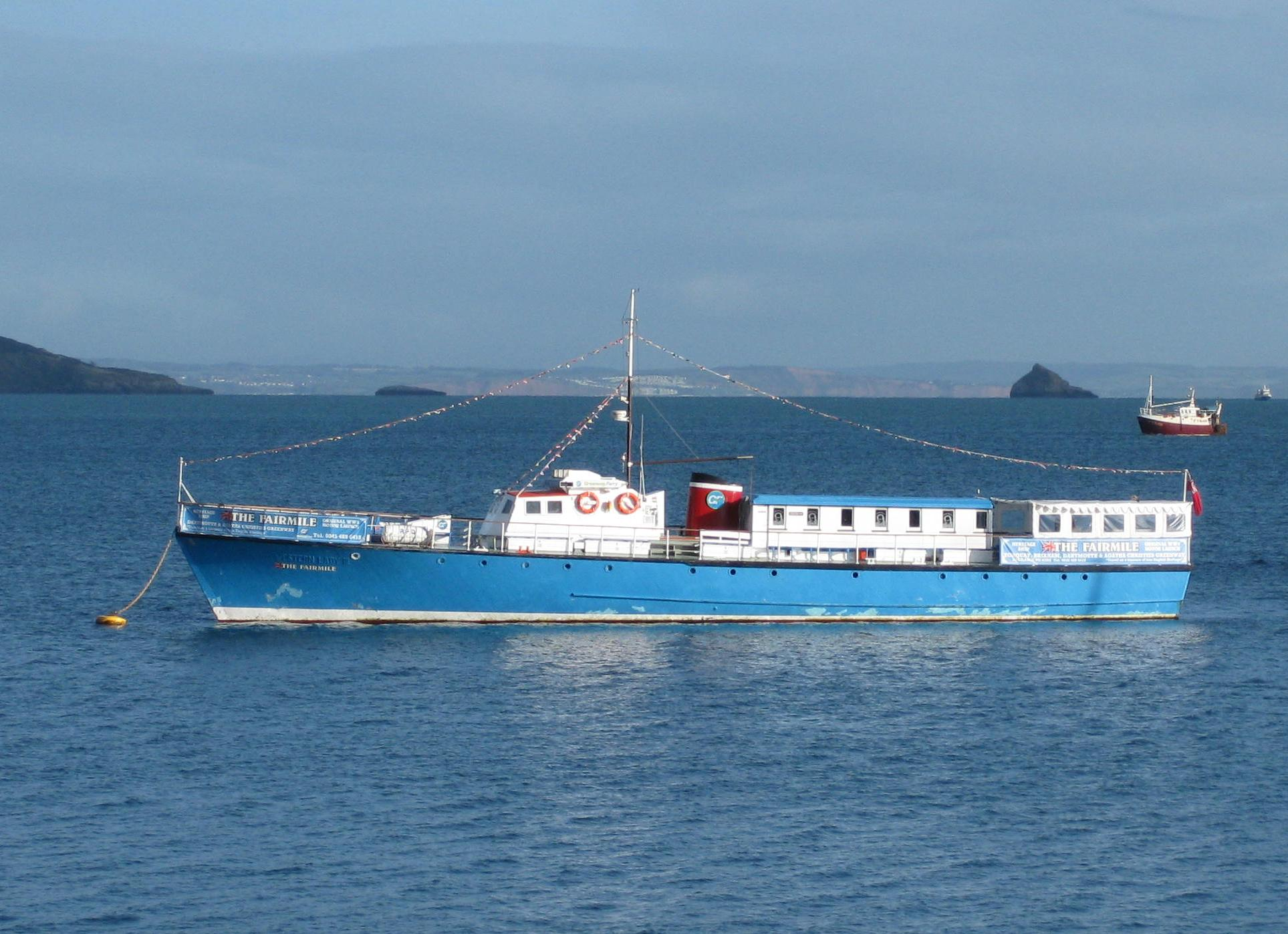
Surviving Fairmile B, RML497 at Brixham in England, prior to restoration to her wartime appearance

== See also ==
- Fairmile A motor launch
- Fairmile C motor gun boat
- Fairmile D motor torpedo boat
- Fairmile H landing craft
- Coastal Forces of the Royal Navy
- Coastal Forces of the Royal Canadian Navy
- R boat – slightly larger German equivalent
