= Fairmile Marine =

British boat building company

Fairmile Marine was a British boat building company founded in 1939 by the car manufacturer Noel Macklin.

Macklin used the garage at his home at Cobham Fairmile in Surrey for manufacturing assembly which is why the boats he designed came to be called Fairmiles.

As a former Royal Horse Artillery and Royal Navy Volunteer Reserve officer, he was inspired to turn his talents and his technical staff to producing boats after reading an article by Vice-Admiral Cecil Vivian Usborne.

After his first designs were accepted and ordered by the Admiralty, Macklin found he had insufficient capital. To solve the problem the Fairmile company became an agency of the Admiralty with Usborne as one of the directors. As a result, the company carried out business without turning a profit, the staff being in effect part of the civil service.

Many Fairmile Bs were built in Commonwealth countries: 80 in Canada, 12 in New Zealand, and six in South Africa.

== Boats designed ==
Class	Type	Designation	Built	Number built	Penant numbers	
Fairmile A	Motor Launch	ML	1940	12	ML 100 to ML 111	Refitted as minesweepers in 1942
Fairmile B	Motor Launch; Air Sea Rescue	ML; ASR	1940–42; 1940–45	616; 668	112-311, 336-500, 511-600, 801-933,4001-4004	Some temporarily fitted with torpedoes
Fairmile C	Motor Gun Boat	MGB	1940–41	24	MGB 312 – MGB 335	
Fairmile D	Motor Gun Boat/Motor Torpedo Boat	MGB; MGB / MTB; MTB	1942–43; 1942–43; 1943–44	95; 229; 134	MGB 601-663,674 MTB 664-673,675-800, 5001-5029	MGB 601-640,649-656 later converted to MTB
Fairmile F	Motor Torpedo Boat	MTB	1944	One (experimental)	MGB 2001	
Fairmile H	Landing Craft Infantry; Landing Craft Support	LCI (S); LCS (L)		40; 10	501–540; 251–260	

== See also ==
- Vospers
- British Power Boat Company
- British Coastal Forces of World War II
