= Fairmile C motor gun boat =

Royal Navy WWII gun boat type

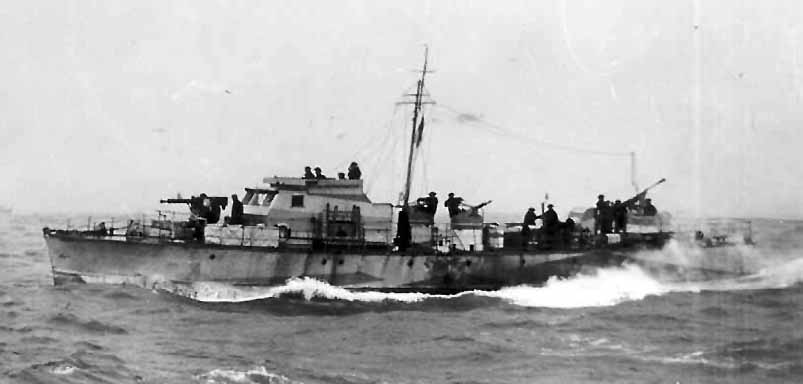
- The Fairmile C motor gunboat MGB 314

Class overview
- Name: Fairmile C motor gunboat
- Preceded by: Fairmile B motor launch
- Succeeded by: Fairmile D motor torpedo boat
- Completed: 24
- Lost: 5
- Retired: 19

General characteristics
- Displacement: 72 tons
- Length: 110 ft (34 m)
- Beam: 17 ft 5 in (5.31 m)
- Draught: 5 ft 8 in (1.73 m)
- Propulsion: Three 850 hp (630 kW) supercharged Hall-Scott petrol engines
- Speed: 26.5 knots (49.1 km/h; 30.5 mph)
- Range: 500 nmi (930 km; 580 mi) at 12 knots (22 km/h; 14 mph) (Bunkerage: 1,800 gal + extra 2,600 gal)
- Complement: 2 officers + 14 ratings
- Armament: (As designed); 1 × QF 2-pounder (40mm) Mark IIC gun; 1 x Rolls-Royce QF 2-pounder Mark XIV gun; 4 × .50 (12.7mm) Vickers machine guns (2 × 2); 4 × .303 in (7.7 mm) Vickers G.O. machine guns (2 × 2); (Later); 2 × 2-pounder (1 x Mk. IIC, 1 x Mk.XIV); 2-4 × 20 mm Oerlikon cannon (2 × 1/2 × 2); 1-2 × 20mm Oerlikon (1 × 1/1 × 2); 4 depth charges

The Fairmile C motor gun boat was a type of motor gunboat designed by Norman Hart of Fairmile Marine for the Royal Navy. An intermediate design, twenty-four boats were ordered on 27 August 1940 from Fairmile Marine in kit form and were assembled at multiple boatbuilders' yards and completed in 1941; they were initially rated as Motor Launches (ML), but received the designation Motor Gun Boats (MGB) on 1 August 1941, being numbered MGB 312–335.

== Design ==
The Fairmile type C was a re-use of the hull form of the type A but with the lessons learned from the type A incorporated in terms of steering and deck layout. They were constructed with hard chine prefabricated double diagonal mahogany hulls over plywood frames. The hull was subdivided into nine watertight compartments. Steering was originally by inside hydraulic steering, then changed to dual steering, with upper bridge steering; they had two underslung rudders.

== Boats ==
Name	Ship Builder	Completed	Fate
MGB 312	Woodnutt & Co., St Helens, Isle of Wight	16 June 1941	Sold for disposal in October 1945.
MGB 313	James N.Miller & Sons, East Shore, St Monance, Fife	12 June 1941	Sunk by mine 15 August 1944 off Normandy.
MGB 314	A. M. Dickie & Sons, Bangor, Gwynedd	26 June 1941	Sunk in St Nazaire Raid on 28 March 1942.
MGB 315	Alex Robertson (Yachtbuilders) & Sons, Sandbank, Argyll	10 July 1941	Sold for disposal in October 1945.
MGB 316	Tough Bros, Teddington Wharf, Manor Road, Teddington	19 May 1941	Sold for disposal in October 1945.
MGB 317	Alex Robertson (Yachtbuilders) & Sons, Sandbank, Argyll	3 September 1941	Sold for disposal in October 1945.
MGB 318	Aldous Successors, The Shipyard, Brightlingsea	6 July 1941	Sold for disposal in October 1945.
MGB 319	Brooke Marine, Oulton Broad, Lowestoft	4 September 1941	Sold for disposal in January 1946.
MGB 320	Alex Robertson (Yachtbuilders) & Sons, Sandbank, Argyll	23 August 1941	Sold for disposal in October 1945.
MGB 321	James A. Silver, Rosneath, Dunbartonshire	9 July 1941	Sold for disposal in October 1945.
MGB 322	A. M. Dickie & Sons, Bangor, Gwynedd	29 July 1941	Sold for disposal in October 1945.
MGB 323	Kris Cruisers (1934), Riverside Yard, Ferryll Road, Isleworth	11 July 1941	Used as target from February 1945.
MGB 324	Woodnutt & Co., St Helens, Isle of Wight	4 September 1941	Sold for disposal in October 1945.
MGB 325	Frank Curtis, Looe, Cornwall	9 September 1941	Sold for disposal in March 1946.
MGB 326	James A. Silver, Rosneath, Dunbartonshire	18 August 1941	Sunk by mine 28 June 1944 off Normandy.
MGB 327	Risdon Beazley, Clausentum Yard, Northam Bridge, Southampton	22 August 1941	Sold for disposal in October 1945.
MGB 328	Lady Bee, Shoreham-by-Sea, Sussex	13 October 1941	Sunk by gunfire 21 July 1941 in the Dover Straits.
MGB 329	Aldous Successors, The Shipyard, Brightlingsea	25 September 1941	Sold for disposal in October 1945.
MGB 330	Tough Bros, Teddington Wharf, Manor Road, Teddington	25 July 1941	Used as target 1946, destroyed by October 1948
MGB 331	Tough Bros, Teddington Wharf, Manor Road, Teddington	13 August 1941	Sold for disposal in October 1945.
MGB 332	James A. Silver, Rosneath, Dunbartonshire	8 October 1941	Sold for disposal in October 1945.
MGB 333	Woodnutt & Co., St Helens, Isle of Wight	16 October 1941	Sold for disposal in October 1945.
MGB 334	A. M. Dickie & Sons, Bangor, Gwynedd	9 October 1941	Sold for disposal in October 1945.
MGB 335	A. M. Dickie & Sons, Bangor, Gwynedd	30 October 1941	Sunk by gunfire 10 September 1942 in the North Sea.

== Service ==
The boats were initially classified as Motor Launches and early units initially carried 'ML' pennant numbers. These were then changed to 'Q' pennant numbers in late 1941 after the boats were reclassified as MGBs (a prefix also used by numerous up-gunned Type 'B' MLs). MGB 335 was photographed at some point in her career wearing an 'MGB' pennant number.

The class was mainly involved in close escort work with east coast convoys, and some boats were engaged in clandestine operations. MGB 314 took part in Operation Chariot, the daring raid on the St Nazaire docks (the only facility on the axis-held Atlantic coast suitable to refit Bismarck-class battleships). MGB 314 served as Commander Robert Ryder's command boat for the operation and exchanged heavy fire with the German shore batteries in order to provide cover for the other landing forces as well as for self-defence. In the course of these intense exchanges of fire, the gunner of the forward pom-pom (Leading Seaman William Savage) was mortally wounded but stood by his gun and continued to fire, earning a posthumous VC for his action. Ryder also received the VC for the same battle. As the British assault force was withdrawing after the battle, the heavily damaged MGB 314 was scuttled after her crew were taken off.

Of the twenty-four boats built, five were lost to enemy action. Two survive to this day, one at Hayling Island and the other in Bembridge Harbour, Isle of Wight, although now sunk and due to be broken up 2018. A third survived in Shoreham until 2002.

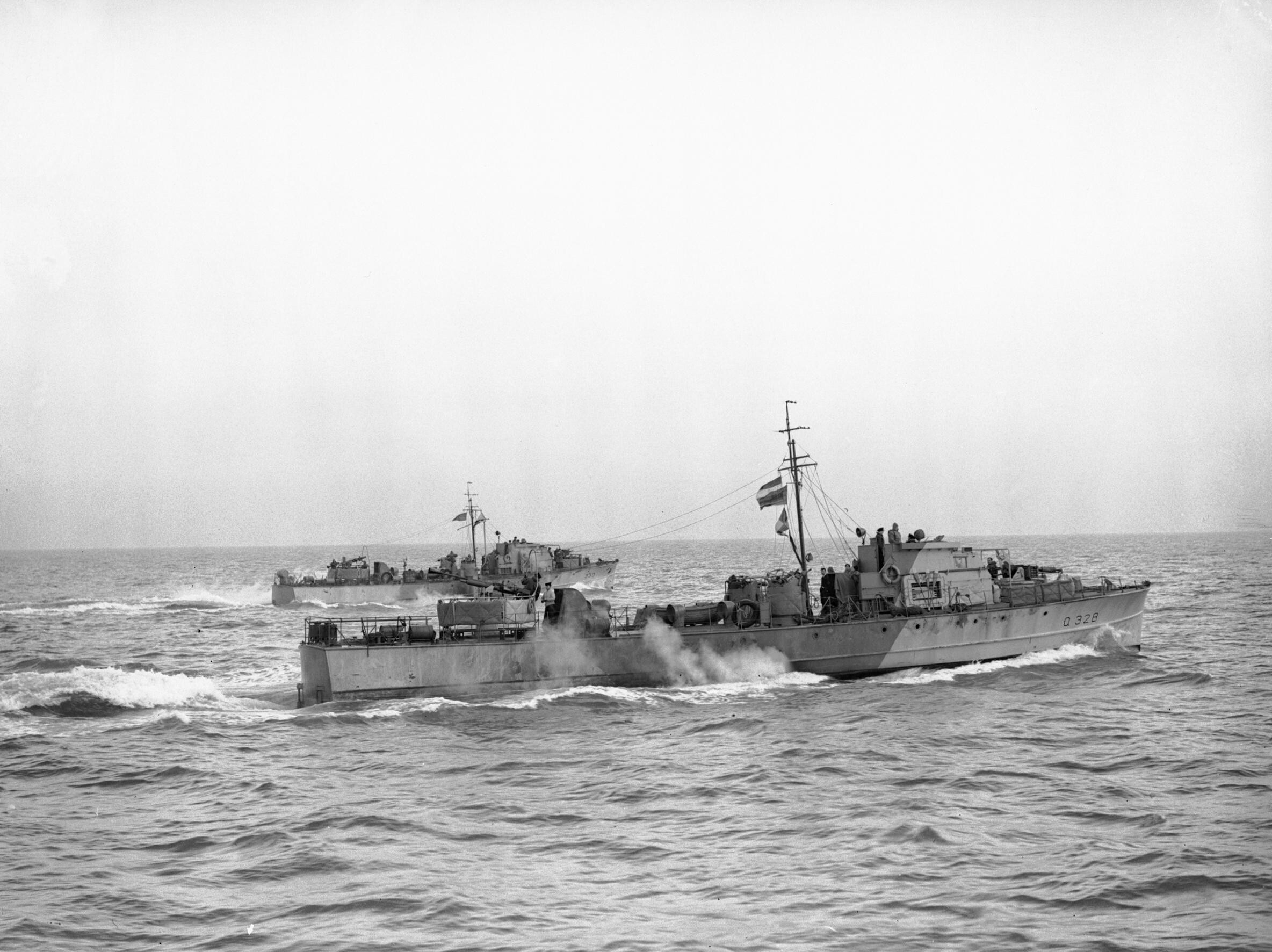
MGB 328 (nearest camera) and MGB 330 off the coast near Dover

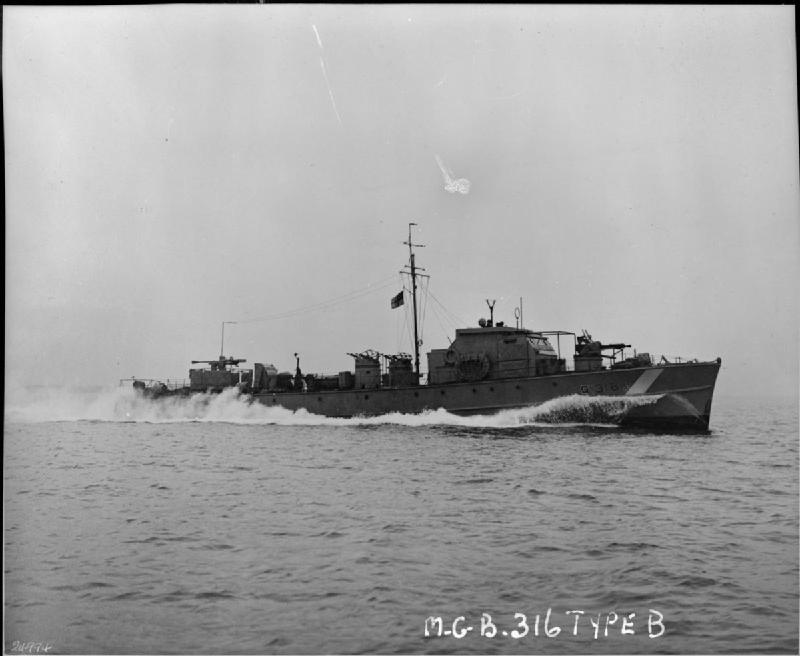
MGB 316 at speed

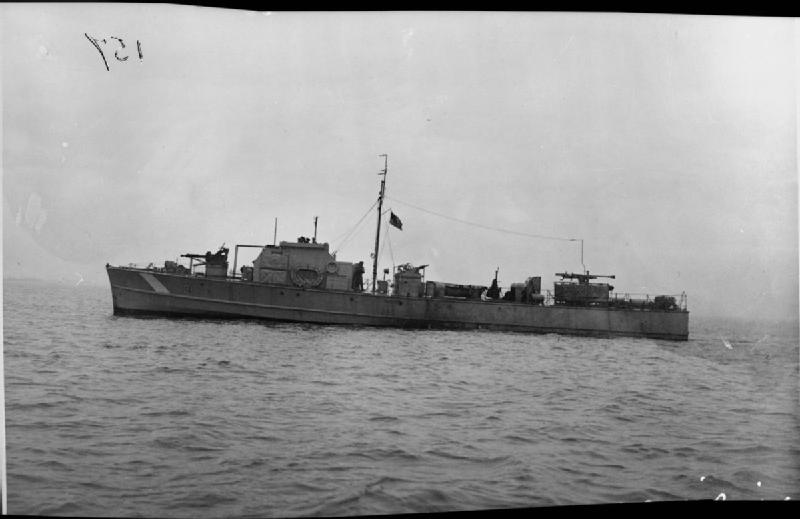
MGB 316 at rest

== See also ==
- Fairmile A motor launch
- Fairmile B motor launch
- Fairmile D motor torpedo boat
- Fairmile H landing craft
- Steam Gun Boat
- Coastal Forces of the Royal Navy
- Camper & Nicholson motor torpedo boat
