= List of classes of British ships of the Cold War =

This is a list of ship classes used by the Royal Navy during The Cold War.

== Aircraft Carriers ==
=== Fleet carriers ===
- Illustrious-class aircraft carrier-WWII era HMS Victorious (R38) modernised in 1950s and in commission till 1968.
- Implacable-class aircraft carrier-WWII era decommissioned in mid 1950s.
- Audacious-class aircraft carrier- Served from 1951 till 1979.

=== Light Carriers ===
- 1942 Design Light Fleet Carrier- WWII era served till early 1960s.
- Centaur-class aircraft carrier- In service 1953 to 1984.
- Invincible-class aircraft carrier- In service from 1980 till 2014.

== Battleships ==
- HMS Vanguard (23)-Last British battleship ever built. Served from 1946 to 1960.

== Cruisers ==
- Tiger-class cruiser-Served from 1959 to 1979.
- Town-class cruiser (1936)-Served from 1936 to 1963.

== Destroyers ==
- C-class destroyer (1943)-Served from 1943 to 1972
- Daring-class destroyer (1949)-Last RN primarily gun armed destroyers
- County-class destroyer-First RN Guided-missile destroyers
- Type 42 destroyer-In service 1975 to 2013
- HMS Bristol (D23)- Served from 1973 to 1991.

== Frigates ==
- Whitby-class frigate
- Rothesay-class frigate
- Leander-class frigate
- Blackwood-class frigate
- Leopard-class frigate
- Salisbury-class frigate
- Tribal-class frigate
- Type 21 frigate
- Type 22 frigate

== Corvettes ==
- Peacock-class corvette

== Submarines ==
=== Ballistic missile submarines ===
- Resolution-class submarine

=== Attack submarines ===
- HMS Dreadnought (S101)
- Valiant-class submarine
- Churchill-class submarine
- Swiftsure-class submarine
- Trafalgar-class submarine

== Amphibious warfare ships ==
- Fearless-class landing platform dock

== Mine countermeasures vessels ==
- Ton-class minesweeper
- Hunt-class mine countermeasures vessel

== Patrol boats ==
- Bird-class patrol vessel
- Ford-class seaward defence boat
- Gay-class patrol boat
- Dark-class patrol boat
- Brave-class patrol boat
- Island-class patrol vessel
- Castle-class patrol vessel
- Archer-class patrol vessel
