= HMS Gay Bombardier =

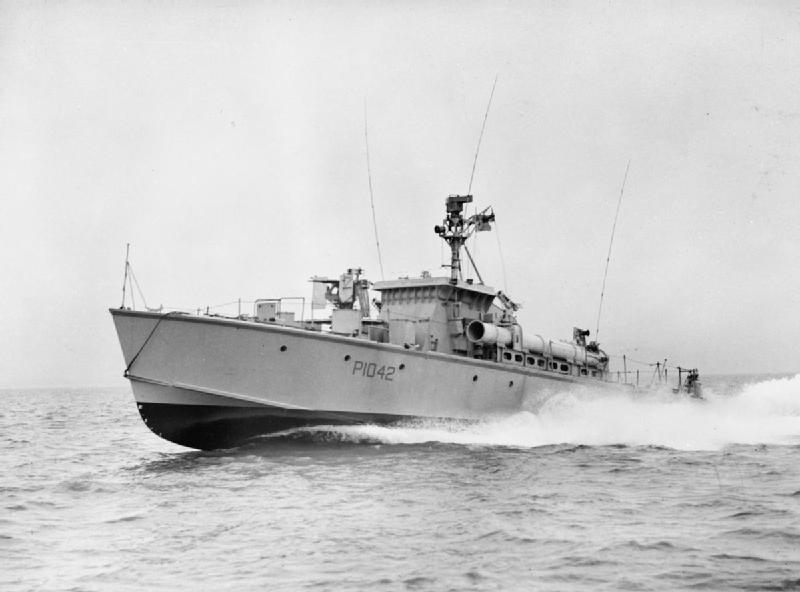

History

United Kingdom
- Name: HMS Gay Bombardier
- Builder: Vosper & Company
- Launched: 28 August 1952
- Identification: Pennant number: P1042
- Fate: Sold on 26 July 1963.

General characteristics
- Class & type: Gay-class fast patrol boat
- Displacement: 50 long tons (51 t) (standard); 65 long tons (66 t) (deep)
- Length: 75 ft 2 in (22.9 m)
- Beam: 20 ft 1 in (6.1 m)
- Draught: 4 ft 1 in (1.2 m)
- Propulsion: 3 × V12 Packard engines; 1,500 hp
- Speed: 40 knots (74 km/h; 46 mph)
- Complement: 13
- Armament: Either: 2 × 40 mm guns; 2 × 21-inch torpedoes; Or: 1 × 4.5-inch gun; 1 × 40 mm gun

HMS Gay Bombardier was a Gay-class fast patrol boat of the Royal Navy. She was built by Vosper, Portchester, and launched on 28 August 1952. She was the second ship to be launched in her class.

Following her sale to a private individual, she was seized and confiscated by the Italian Customs service in the mid-1960s. Her eventual fate is unknown.
