= Robert Peverell Hichens =

British naval commander

Lieutenant-Commander Robert Peverell Hichens DSO & Bar DSC & Two Bars
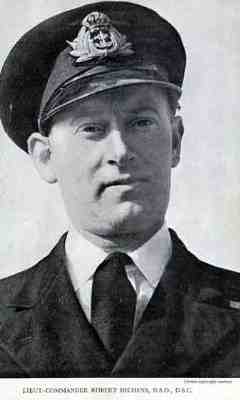
- Robert Peverell Hichens
- Born: 2 March 1909; Northampton, England
- Died: 13 April 1943 (aged 34); North Sea
- Burial place: Felixstowe
- Military career
- Allegiance: United Kingdom
- Branch: Territorial Army (1929–1936); Royal Navy Volunteer Reserve (1936–1943)
- Service years: 1929–1943
- Rank: Lieutenant-Commander
- Nickname: Hitch
- Unit: Coastal Forces
- Commands: MASB 16; MASB 18; MASB 14; MGB 64; 6th MGB Flotilla; MGB 77; 8th MGB Flotilla
- Conflicts: Second World War: Dunkirk evacuation
- Awards: Distinguished Service Order & Bar; Distinguished Service Cross & Two Bars; Mentioned in Despatches (3)

Lieutenant-Commander Robert Peverell Hichens, DSO & Bar, DSC & Two Bars (2 March 1909 – 13 April 1943) was the most highly decorated officer of the Royal Navy Volunteer Reserve (RNVR), being awarded two Distinguished Service Orders, three Distinguished Service Crosses and three Mentions in Despatches. He was also recommended for a Victoria Cross after being killed in action in April 1943.

Before the Second World War, Hichens was a keen sportsman who rowed for Magdalen College, Oxford, and competed in the Double sculls at the Henley Regatta. He also competed in International Fourteen sailing events and three times participated in the Fastnet race. On land he raced in hill climbing events in Somerset and also entered the 24 Hours of Le Mans race three times. During the Second World War, he rose in rank to become a lieutenant commander and commanded the 6th Motor gun boat Flotilla and later the 8th Motor Gun Boat Flotilla.

== Early life ==
Robert Peverell Hichens was born on 2 March 1909, the son of Doctor Peverell Smythe Hichens and Constance Sawbridge Hichens. He spent his early life in Northampton, until the start of the First World War when his father—an officer in a Territorial Army unit of the Royal Army Medical Corps—was sent to France, and the rest of the family moved to St Mawes in Cornwall. It was when living in Cornwall that Hichens and his sister Loveday were taught how to sail, eventually sailing their dinghy Arethusa on Carrick Roads.

=== Education ===
In 1919, following the War, the family returned to the Northampton area, and Hichens was sent to a prep school nearby until 1921, when he was enrolled in Marlborough College. In 1922, Hichens' father, by now a consulting physician at Northampton General Hospital, retired and the family moved to Guernsey in the Channel Islands, purchasing Havelet House just outside Saint Peter Port. Hichens entered Magdalen College, Oxford, to read law in 1927. A keen sportsman, he started rowing and within six months was in the Magdalan second eight; by the following year he made the first eight as stroke oarsman. In the Eights Week races (the annual summer Head of the River Race at Oxford), when Hichens was at Magdalen, they came third in 1928, sixth in 1929 and eighth in 1930, which was the college's lowest position in the race since 1876. While at university he also joined the Officers Training Corps, receiving a commission as second lieutenant in the infantry on 2 June 1929. In 1929, the Hichens family had purchased Bodrennick House at Flushing, Cornwall, which they moved into in 1930, after the death of Hichens' father.

== Married life ==
Robert Hichens met his future wife, Catherine Gilbert Enys of Enys, Penryn, in 1928; they were married at St Gluvias church, Penryn, Cornwall, in April 1931. The following year he joined a firm of solicitors, Reginald Rodgers and Son of Falmouth, Cornwall, as an articled clerk to be instructed as a solicitor. Hichens also trained in London with Mackrell's of Bedford Square; it was when working in London that he competed at the Henley Regatta in the Double sculls. In June 1933, after his mother's death, Hichens inherited half of his father's estate and Bodrennick House, and at the same time completed his articles. He became a junior partner with Reginald Rodgers on 1 January 1934. Robert and Catherine had two sons: Robert, born in 1932, and Antony, born in 1936.

== Competitive sailing ==
During this time Hichens had continued to sail; he joined the Royal Cornwall Yacht Club and started to race in International Fourteen events in his own dinghies called Venture and Venture II. He competed in the Fowey Regatta and the Prince of Wales Cup, coming fifth on the River Clyde in 1936. He also entered the competition at Lowestoft in 1937 and at Falmouth in 1938. Hichens had also taken up offshore yacht racing and was a member of the Royal Ocean Racing Club, competed three times in the Fastnet race, and crewed in the Channel race in June 1939.

== Motor racing ==
In 1935, he purchased a 1.4-litre Aston Martin touring car and a Riley which he used to compete in hill climbs at Beggers Roost in Somerset. Then in 1936, he purchased a 2-litre Aston Martin Speed Model—one of six built for the Ulster TT and 24 Hours of Le Mans race that year. With assistance from Aston Martin he entered the car for the 1937 24 Hours of Le Mans, with Mortimer Morris-Goodall as his co-driver. They finished eleventh place overall but did win the Rudge Whitworth Cup. They competed again in the 1938 24 Hours of Le Mans but did not finish. They returned for the 1939 24 Hours of Le Mans where they finished twelfth.

== Second World War ==
Robert Hichens applied to transfer from the Territorial Army to the Royal Naval Volunteer Reserve (RNVR) in the summer of 1930, and eventually transferred to the Royal Naval Volunteer Supplementary Reserve in 1936, which was formed from yachtsmen sufficiently knowledgeable about the sea to be considered suitable for a commission. After the declaration of war he was ordered to join the training depot HMS King Alfred on 27 October 1939, and after passing an interview and medical was promoted to sub lieutenant RNVR, completing his training in six weeks instead of the normal three months.

=== Phoney war and Dunkirk ===
Having completed training in December 1939, he was promoted to lieutenant and appointed to HMS Halcyon, part of the 5th Minesweeping Flotilla and later the 4th Minesweeping Flotilla. He moved ship to HMS Niger in April 1940, during the Phoney war period both flotillas were kept busy minesweeping in the North Sea and the only action seen was on 15 May 1940, when HMS Hussar was holed by a German bomber. On 29 May 1940, Hichens was informed that the British Expeditionary Force were being evacuated from Dunkirk in Operation Dynamo and that Niger would be leaving to assist. Arriving off Dunkirk on 31 May, Hichens organised the small boats and yachts used to evacuate the army from the Dunkirk jetty. When Niger was ordered home with a full complement of soldiers, Hichens asked to be left behind to continue with the evacuation. He was given permission but also informed he would have to find his own way home. Arriving back in Dover on the yacht Chico he rejoined Niger on 1 June. HMS Niger returned to Dunkirk another three times, Hichens once more went ashore to arrange the evacuation before the end of the operation. For his work on the beaches in the withdrawal of the Allied armies from Dunkirk, Hichens was awarded the Distinguished Service Cross (DSC).

=== Coastal forces ===
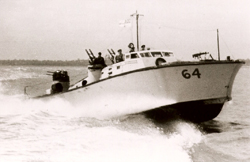
MGB 64 at this stage of the war armed with twin Lewis guns alongside the bridge and a four barrelled Boulton Paul gun turret aft.

Having asked for a transfer to Coastal Forces Hichens was sent to HMS Osprey at Portland for training on Motor Anti-Submarine Boats (MASB). He was appointed to his first command, MASB 16, on 4 November 1940, which he held until 18 November 1940, when he was appointed commander of MASB 18. His final MASB command was MASB 14, which he took up 23 December 1940. These boats were lightly armed with two twin Vickers .50 machine guns and depth charges and had a top speed of about 30 knots.

In January 1941, Hichens was given a new command, Motor gun boat 64, becoming the first RNVR officer to command a MGB, and the only RNVR crewed boat in the 6th MGB Flotilla. It was when in command of MGB 64 that Hichens got his nickname Hitch. As each boat needed to select a radio call sign, Hichens could not think of anything suitable and Lieutenant Arty Shaw suggested Hitch, which stuck and remained with him for the rest of his time with the coastal forces.

The 6th MGB Flotilla was based at HMS Beehive in Felixstowe from April 1941, where they were tasked to engage German E boats raiding east coast convoys. At this stage in the war MGBs were armed with a mixture of weapons, which could be Lewis machine guns, Vickers .50 machine guns, Oerlikon 20 mm cannon, Rolls-Royce 2-pounder gun or four barrelled Boulton Paul gun turrets. The armament was soon standardized with two twin Vickers .50 machine guns each side of the bridge, an Oerlikon 20 mm cannon mounted aft, and depth charges. The boats had a crew of 18, consisting of two officers, two petty officers and 14 ratings.

=== Flotilla commander ===
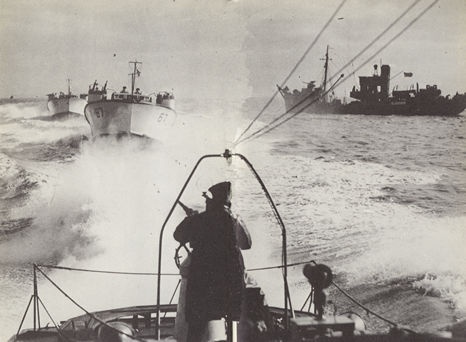
6th MGB Flotilla, Hitch's MGB 64 leading. The aft mounted 20mm Oerlikon position can be easily seen

When Robert Hichens was appointed senior officer in command of the 6th MGB Flotilla from September 1941, he became the first RNVR officer to command a flotilla in the Second World War. Along with the new command came a promotion to lieutenant commander.

As flotilla commander his first successful action took place the night of 19/20 November 1941, when his flotilla was ordered to patrol 10 miles (16 km) off the Hook of Holland to engage E boats returning to base. The flotilla engaged five E boats, causing damage to all five boats, damaging two severely and forcing them to disperse. One E boat was later found abandoned by the crew and boarded. This was the first E boat captured and Hichens' crew obtained valuable information and equipment before the boat sank. (Note: After the war it was discovered that two E boats had been lost that night, S41 and S53. S41 was the boat that was boarded.) For this action Hichens was awarded a Bar to his DSC, the citation noting his "...[c]oolness skill and readiness when in action against enemy E boats sinking one and damaging others". Other members of the flotilla were awarded one Distinguished Service Medal (DSM) and five others were Mentioned in Dispatches (MID) for the action.

The flotilla's second success was the night of 19/20 December 1941, again in the North Sea off the Dutch coast, when two boats engaged two R boats and one E boat. They passed twice at high speed before losing contact, but twice during the night they located them and eventually carried out depth charge attacks. Both Hichens and the commander of the other boat received a MID for this action.

The third major action Hichens was involved in during this period was the action during the night of 21/22 April 1942, off Ostend, when they engaged six E boats, forcing the superior force to scatter and run for port after severely damaging one boat and causing slight damage to the others. After this action the E boats were moved to a safer harbour to operate from. Hichens was awarded a Distinguished Service Order (DSO) following this engagement.

=== 8th MGB Flotilla ===
Hichens was next appointed commander of the 8th MGB Flotilla. These new boats were armed with a twin Oerlikon mount aft, a QF 2-pounder Mark XIV forward, twin Lewis or later twin Vickers machine guns either side of the bridge and depth charges. The flotilla was moved to Dartmouth, Devon, in July 1942. The first action they were involved in was during the night of 14/15 July. Ordered to engage E Boats using Cherbourg as a base they found a convoy of naval trawlers escorting a small tanker. The flotilla engaged the two rear escort trawlers and carried out a depth charge attack. The tanker was last seen to be on fire as the flotilla reformed off Alderney. After this action Hichens was awarded a Bar to his DSO. Both the DSO and the Bar were presented during the same investiture at Buckingham Palace on 22 September 1942, while other members of the flotilla were awarded a Conspicuous Gallantry Medal and four MIDs for the action. (Note: Hichens family legend recalls on one of his many investitures King George VI is supposed to have joked "What you again".)

The flotilla was next in action during the night 29/30 July again off Ostend, when the flotilla in company with two Motor Torpedo Boats (MTB) engaged a convoy of three Flak trawlers and two merchant ships. One of the merchant ships was hit by torpedoes from the MTBs while the MGBs engaged the other by dropping depth charges. With those ships destroyed they then engaged the Flak trawlers.

During the night 1/2 August, under orders to patrol north west of Guernsey, the flotilla again located enemy shipping. Following them towards the port of Cherbourg they silently passed a German torpedo boat lying at anchor, (Note: This vessel of about 600 tons was the same size as a small destroyer but they were unable to engage having nothing that would cause it any damage.) and located four E boats waiting to enter harbour. Having caught them by surprise they opened fire on the stationary boats and after a short engagement withdrew leaving two of the enemy boats on fire. For this action Hichens received a second MID, while other members of the flotilla were awarded a DSC, two DSMs and four MIDs.

The flotilla was ordered back to Felixstowe in Autumn 1942. Their first contact with the enemy was on the night 14/15 September when they engaged a small convoy off the Hook of Holland. They followed a convoy that was escorted by four Flak trawlers almost into harbour before inflicting considerable damage to it. For this, Hichens was awarded a second Bar to his DSC. Other members of the flotilla were awarded a DSC, two DSMs and a MID.

Hichens, now the recipient of two DSOs, three DSCs and two MIDs, was offered promotion to commander in command of HMS Bee at Weymouth, Dorset, and a training post ashore. Feeling unsuited for such a role, he declined and remained commander of the 8th MGB flotilla.

=== Casualties ===
Hichens lost the first boat under his command during the night action 2/3 October 1942. Engaging four trawlers MGB 78 went in for a depth charge attack and was lost to enemy fire. Another boat, MGB 76, was lost during the night of 5/6 October 1942, when the flotilla was ambushed by two German torpedo boats and a number of E boats.

The winter months of 1942–43 were uneventful, and Hichens started to write his unfinished account of the war. We fought them in Gunboats was published posthumously in 1944.

The flotilla, accompanied by four MTBs and escorting mine laying Motor Launches (ML), were next in action over the night of 27/28 February 1943. The mixed flotilla engaged a convoy escorted by two trawlers and a minesweeper, and lost MGB 79 to enemy fire. Hichens closed with the stricken boat, which was on fire, to remove the crew. They managed to rescue seven of the crew before being forced to withdraw under fire. Hichens' own boat, MGB 77, was also set on fire during the rescue.

On the night of 12/13 April 1943, the flotilla was ordered to escort mine laying MLs off the Dutch coast. Detecting two trawlers they engaged them leaving one on fire, but as they withdrew MGB 77 was hit, killing Hichens outright and wounding three others on the bridge. Hichens received a posthumous MID for these actions.

=== Victoria Cross recommendation ===
Hichens was recommended for the Victoria Cross for his actions during the night of 27/28 February. When informed by his commanding officer, Commander Kerr, of the intention to recommend him, Hichens requested that the recommendation be dropped as he now felt he had endangered two of the boats in the flotilla trying to rescue his friends. Kerr, respecting his views, dropped the recommendation, only for it to be resubmitted six weeks later after his death. The recommendation was endorsed by Commander Kerr, Admiral George Lyon (the Commander-in-Chief, The Nore) and Rear Admiral Rogers (the Flag officer in charge at Harwich). The recommendation was rejected by the Admiralty, citing the same reasons Hichens had himself given. (Note: After having decided that they were not going to award a Victoria Cross, under the British honours system at the time the only other option left to the authorities was a posthumous MID.)

== Notes ==
Footnotes

Citations

General

- The Army Quarterly and Defence Journal, Volume 124. West of England Press. 1994. Digitized 23 August 2008.
- Cook, Graeme (1977). Small Boat Raiders. Hart-Davis MacGibbon. ISBN 0-246-10807-X.
- Gore, David (1997). A Cornish Inheritance: the Harveys of Chacewater. Lower Basildon: David Gore. ISBN 0-9530912-0-1.
- Hichens, Antony (2008). Gunboat Commander: the biography of Lieutenant Commander Robert Hichens DSO* DSC** RNVR. Pen & Sword Military. ISBN 978-1-84415-656-6.
- Lambert, John; Ross, Al (1990). Allied Coastal Forces of World War II: Fairmile Designs and US Submarine Chasers. Conway. ISBN 0-85177-519-5.
- Reynolds, Leonard C (2000). Home Waters MTBs & MGBs at War, 1939–1945. Sutton in association with The Imperial War Museum. ISBN 0-7509-2518-3.
- Scott, Peter (2009). Battle of the Narrow Seas: the history of the Light Coastal Forces in the Channel & North Sea, 1939–1945. Naval Institute Press. ISBN 978-1-59114-041-2.
