= HMS Archer =

Seven ships of the Royal Navy have been named HMS Archer, named after a person proficient in archery - an archer:

- HMS Archer (1801) was a 12-gun gun-brig launched in 1801 and sold in 1815.
- HMS Archer (1849) was a wood screw sloop launched in 1849 and broken up in 1866.
- HMS Archer (1885) was a torpedo cruiser launched in 1885 and sold in 1905.
- HMS Archer (1911) was an Acheron-class destroyer launched in 1911 and sold in 1921.
- HMS Archer (D78) was a Long Island-class escort carrier launched in 1939 and transferred to the Royal Navy on Lend-lease in 1941. She was later operated by the Ministry of War Transport as Empire Lagan, and was returned to the US in 1945. She was sold into mercantile service and was broken up in 1962.
- HMS Archer (P264) is an Archer-class patrol vessel launched in 1985 and is currently in service.

== See also ==
- HMAS Archer was an Attack-class patrol boat of the Royal Australian Navy launched in 1967 and sold to Indonesia in 1974, renamed Siliman.
- HMS Gay Archer was a Gay-class patrol boat of the Royal Navy launched on 20 August 1952, and currently refitted for civilian use.
