= List of naval vessels of the United Kingdom =

This is a list of all naval vessels ever used by the United Kingdom under the Royal Navy and other UK maritime organisations or groups that participated in UK conflicts. This list will consist of lists of naval vessels used at specific time periods such as World War II and the Modern day as well as a list of Royal Navy ship names that will look at all Royal Navy ships ever used.

== List of ships of the Royal Navy ==
- List of ship names of the Royal Navy

== World War II ==
- List of classes of British ships of World War II

== Cold War ==
- List of classes of British ships of the Cold War

== Modern day ==
- List of active Royal Navy ships

== Gallery of past and present naval vessels of the United Kingdom ==
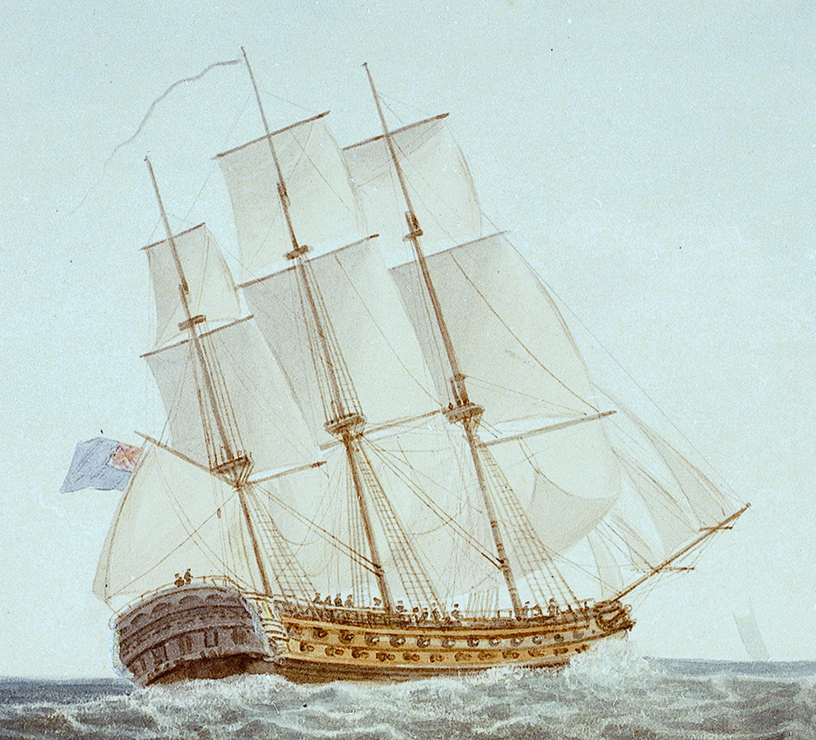
HMS Ajax(1798) an Ajax-class ship of the line that served in the Napoleonic Wars. HMS Ajax is a Third-rate ship which formed the majority of the Royal Navy's ships of the line at that time. Ships of the line were the main ships used in naval battles at the time.

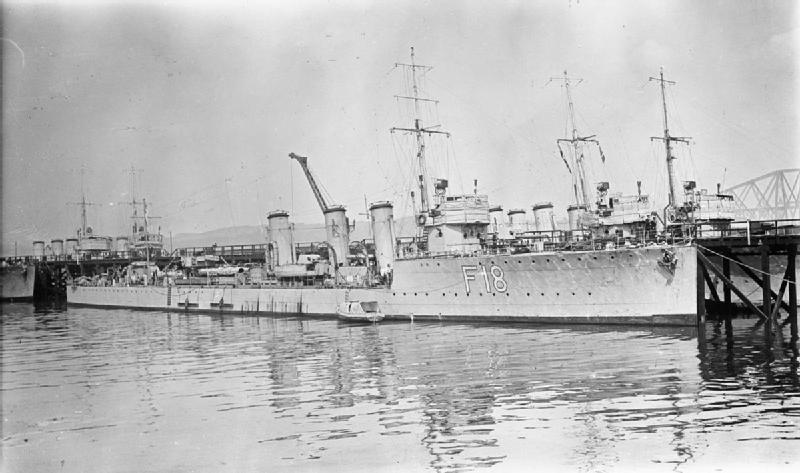
HMS Paladin (1916) a Admiralty M-class destroyer that served during World War I.

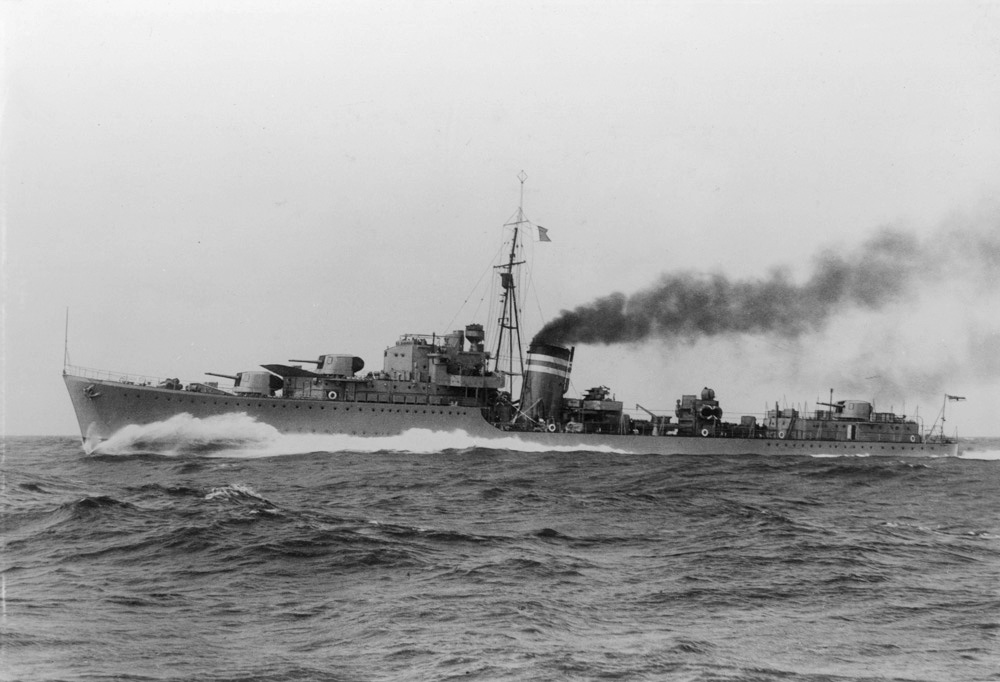
HMS Jervis a J class destroyer that served during World War II.

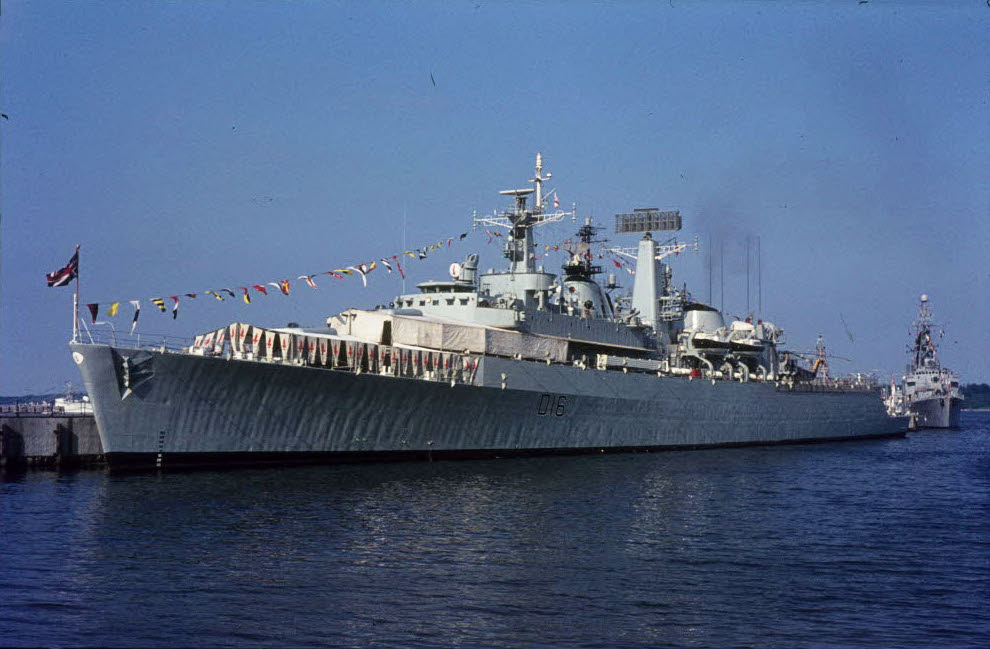
HMS London (D16) a County-class destroyer that served during the Cold War.

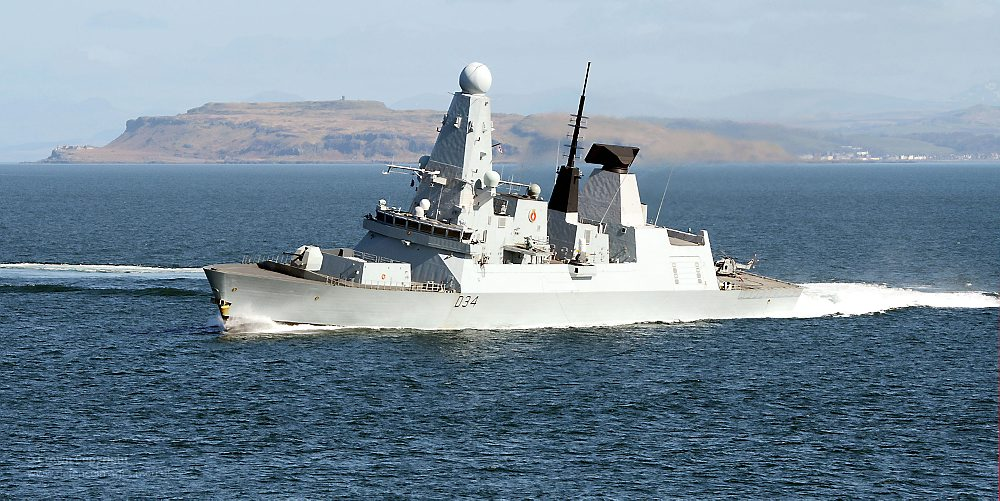
HMS Diamond (D34) a Type 45 destroyer currently in service with the Royal Navy.
