= Cutlass (disambiguation) =

A cutlass is a type of sword.

Cutlass may also refer to:

== Military ==
- HMS Cutlass, several ships of the British Royal Navy
- HMS Empire Cutlass, a 1943 infantry landing ship
- USS Cutlass (SS-478), a 1944 U.S. Navy submarine, later used by the Republic of China
- Vought F7U Cutlass, US Navy carrier-based fighter-bomber aircraft in service 1951–1959
- a nickname for the U.S. Navy's Enlisted Surface Warfare Specialist pin

== Other uses ==
- Cutlass (film), a short 2007 film directed by Kate Hudson
- Cutlass (rocket engine)
- The Cutlass, a 2017 Caribbean film
- Cutlass programming language and application system, developed by the UK's Central Electricity Generating Board
- Cessna 172RG Cutlass, a light, civilian, single-engined aircraft
  - Cessna 172Q Cutlass, a related light aircraft
- Frankie Cutlass (born 1971), American rapper and music producer
- Oldsmobile Cutlass, an automobile line
- A term for the machete in the English-speaking Caribbean

== See also ==
- Cutlassfish, a family of tropical fish
- Kutless, a band
