= Vosper Thorneycroft =

Vosper Thornycroft may refer to:

- John I. Thornycroft & Company, a British shipbuilding firm based in Woolston, Southampton from 1904 to 2003 which merged with Vosper & Company in 1966 to form Vosper Thornycroft which later became VT Group
- Vosper & Company, a British shipbuilding company based in Portsmouth which merged with John I. Thornycroft & Company in 1966 to form Vosper Thornycroft which later became VT Group
- Babcock International, a multinational corporation headquartered in the United Kingdom which took over Vosper Thornycroft/VT Group in 2010, and continues its UK and international operations
- VT Group, the name of Vosper Thornycroft from 2002 to 2012 during which period it absorbed international and US based defence and services companies; and from 2012 the name of a United States defence and services company which bought the US based operations of the former Vosper Thornycroft company from Babcock International
