= 29th Motor Torpedo Boat Flotilla =

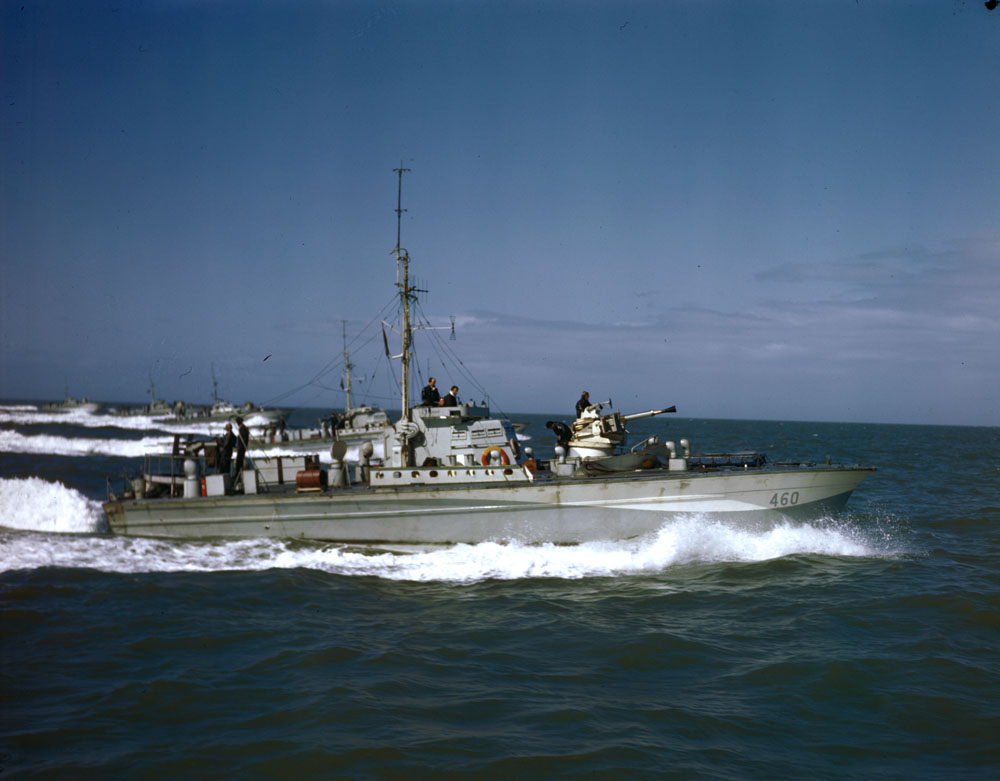
- MTB 460
- Active: 1944-1945
- Country: Canada
- Branch: Royal Canadian Navy
- Type: Naval force
- Role: Escort; Coastal Defence; Anti-submarine operations
- Equipment: 71ft 6ins (Mk.VI) Type 'G' motor torpedo boat
- Engagements: D Day

The 29th Motor Torpedo Boat Flotilla was a motor torpedo boat (MTB) flotilla crewed by Royal Canadian Navy (RCN) reservists in service with the Coastal Forces of the Royal Navy during the Second World War. The 29th MTB Flotilla had a short and distinguished history in the English Channel, including action during the Normandy landings in 1944.

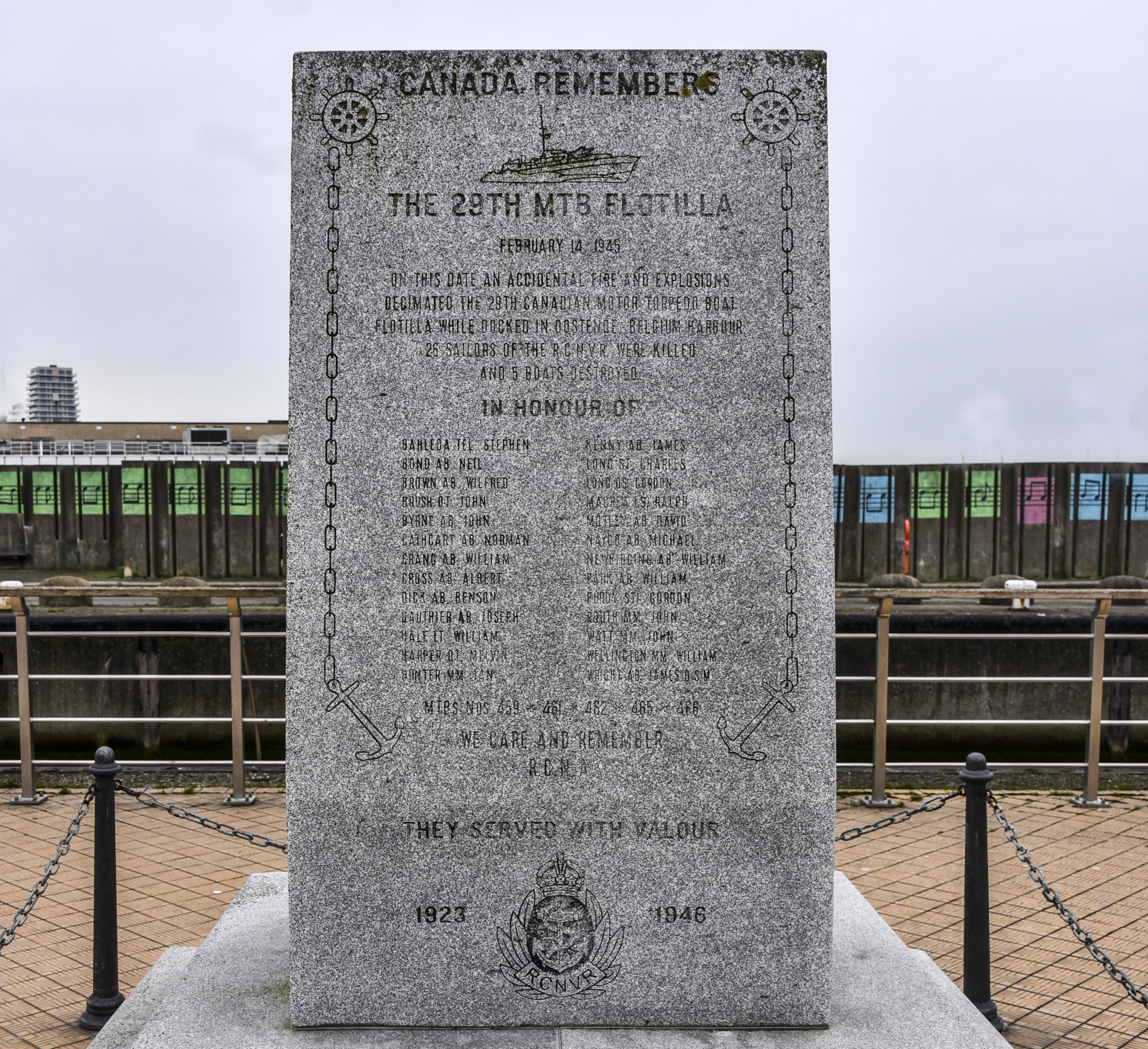
Memorial in Ostend

== Operations ==
Formed in March 1944 under the command of an experienced Lt Anthony Law (RCNVR) and equipped with eight British built 71 ft 6ins (Mk.VI) Type 'G' MTBs, the 29th Flotilla conducted initial work up training at HMS Bee Coastal Forces Base at (Holyhead) throughout the month of April 1944, moving to its first operational base HMS Fervent Coastal Forces Base (Ramsgate) in May 1944.

The first mission assigned to the 29th MTB Flotilla was given to MTBs 460,462,464 and 465. Tasked with escorting a clandestine mine gathering expedition to the German controlled Normandy coast, on 16 May 1944 the Canadian MTBs proceeded to the French Coast along with two British MTBs, protecting them as volunteers were landed ashore by outboards to lift sample mines from the German beach defence. Managing to accomplish their mission undetected, the captured mines provided much needed intelligence prior to the Allied D-Day landings.

Between 20 and 22 May 1944, the 29th MTB Flotilla joined RCN Tribal-class destroyers and the 65th MTB Flotilla in intercepting enemy coastal convoys in the English Channel. Targeting German schnellboote (E-boats), escort ships, merchant vessels; the MTBs lured German destroyers within the gun range of accompanying heavier warships. Following this success, on 27 May 1944 the 29th MTB Flotilla moved to HMS Hornet Coastal Forces Base at Gosport (Portsmouth), in preparation for Operation Neptune in June 1944.

During the Normandy invasion on June 6, 1944, the 29th Flotilla was tasked with guarding the east flank of the invasion fleets, while the 65th Flotilla was assigned to protect the western flank. Following the invasion, the MTBs of the 29th Flotilla patrolled the 15 km distance between the eastern edge of the assault area and the German naval base at Le Havre. Each night three or four Canadian MTBs waited until larger Allied ships tracked the German surface ships attempting either to attack the allied assault area or transport supplies into Le Havre. Typically, short, sharp engagements followed, with the Germans turning back to safety once they realized Allied forces were in place. The 29th Flotilla carried out this duty through August 1944, and in the words of the flotilla commander Lt Cdr Anthony Law, RCNVR:

"The officers and men were beginning to show the strain caused by months of these nerve wracking operations, and this combined with irregular meals was responsible for many of us losing weight. The 29th was battle-weary, and we were beginning to feel that we could not last much longer under the severe conditions: mines going off, shore batteries pounding on us; and dive bombers, like vicious bats, roaring out of the night and putting the fear of God into us…the personnel of the 29th were falling victim to horrible, haunting fears, and the boats, whose arduous task of defending the anchorage had almost burned them out, were badly in need of repair."

— Lt Cdr Anthony Law, RCNVR

Based at HMS Beehive, Felixstowe in October 1944, the 29th Flotilla was later transferred to Coastal Forces Mobile Unit (CFMU) No. 1, Ostend, Belgium where disaster struck. The 29th Flotilla was disbanded shortly after five Canadian boats were sunk & twenty-six sailors were killed by an explosion while alongside at Ostend, on 14 February 1945. After the disbandment of the 29th MTB Flotilla, the remaining Canadian boats were attached to other RN flotillas.

Organisation on 6 June 1944
MTB	Commanding Officer
MTB 459	Lt C.A. Law, RCNVR (as S.O.)
MTB 460	Lt D.A. Killam, RCNVR
MTB 461	Lt. C.A. Burk, RCNVR
MTB 462	Lt. R.J. Moyse, RCNVR
MTB 463	Lt. D.G. Creba, RCNVR
MTB 464	Lt. L.C. Bishop, RCNVR
MTB 465	Lt C.D. Chaffey, RCNVR
MTB 466	Lt S.B. Marshall, RCNVR

== 71ft 6ins (Mk.VI) Type 'G' motor torpedo boat ==
Built by the British Power Boat Company (BPB) at their yard in Hythe, Hampshire, originally eight 71 ft 6in (known to the Canadians as Type 'G' ) MTBs (459, 460, 461, 462, 463, 464, 465, 466) were assigned to the 29th MTB Flotilla, with three more boats (485, 486, 491) added later to replace damaged or sunken vessels. Originally designed as Motor Gun Boats (MGBs), they were modified and re-designated as MTBs. Different boats received torpedo tubes at different times and several boats (such as MTB 460)were photographed whilst in service without torpedo tubes, although having the mounting rails fitted to their decks. These boats had to fight as MGBs until they received their torpedoes, although still carrying 'MTB' pennant numbers. (Driven by three Packard V-12 Supercharged 1250 H.P. engines, each with a 2,500 gallon capacity of 100 octane gas, these vessels had an operational radius of about 140 miles while cruising at 25 knots, and a top speed of some 40 knots. MTB 486 is the only known MTB of the 29th MTB Flotilla to survive into the 21st century as a civilian houseboat renamed Sungo.

29th Canadian MTB Flotilla
Name	Pennant #	Shipbuilder	Location	Transferred to the RCN	Removed from RCN service	Fate
MTB 459	MTB 459	British Power Boat	Hythe, England, U.K.	26 Jan 1944	14 Feb 1945	Ex-MGB 140 (1943) Destroyed by an explosion and subsequent fire at Oostende, Belgium on 14 February 1945
MTB 460	MTB 460	British Power Boat	Hythe, England, U.K.	25 Feb 1944	1 Jul 1944	Mined and sunk off Normandy, France on 1 July 1944
	MTB 461	British Power Boat	Hythe, England, U.K.	28 Feb 1944	14 Feb 1945	Destroyed by an explosion and subsequent fire at Oostende, Belgium on 14 February 1945
MTB 462	MTB 462	British Power Boat	Hythe, England, U.K.	01 Mar 1944	14 Feb 1945	Destroyed by an explosion and subsequent fire at Oostende, Belgium on 14 February 1945
MTB 463	MTB 463	British Power Boat	Hythe, England, U.K.	16 Mar 1944	7 Jul 1944	Mined and sunk off Normandy, France on 7 July 1944
	MTB 464	British Power Boat	Hythe, England, U.K.	26 Mar 1944	09 Jun 1945	Sold in May 1945
	MTB 465	British Power Boat	Hythe, England, U.K.	27 Mar 1944	14 Feb 1945	Destroyed by an explosion and subsequent fire at Oostende, Belgium on 14 February 1945
MTB 466	MTB 466	British Power Boat	Hythe, England, U.K.	29 Mar 1944	14 Feb 1945	Destroyed by an explosion and subsequent fire at Oostende, Belgium on 14 February 1945
MTB 485	MTB 485	British Power Boat	Hythe, England, U.K.	10 Mar 1945	1945	Returned to the RN in 1945 Sold in 1945
MTB 486	MTB 486	British Power Boat	Hythe, England, U.K.	05 Aug 1944	08 Mar 1945	Sold 1945
	MTB 491	British Power Boat	Hythe, England, U.K.	04 Oct 1944	10 Mar 1945	Returned to the Royal Navy in 1945 Sold in January 1946

== See also ==
- Coastal Forces of the Royal Navy
- Coastal Forces of the Royal Canadian Navy
