= HMS Gay Bruiser =

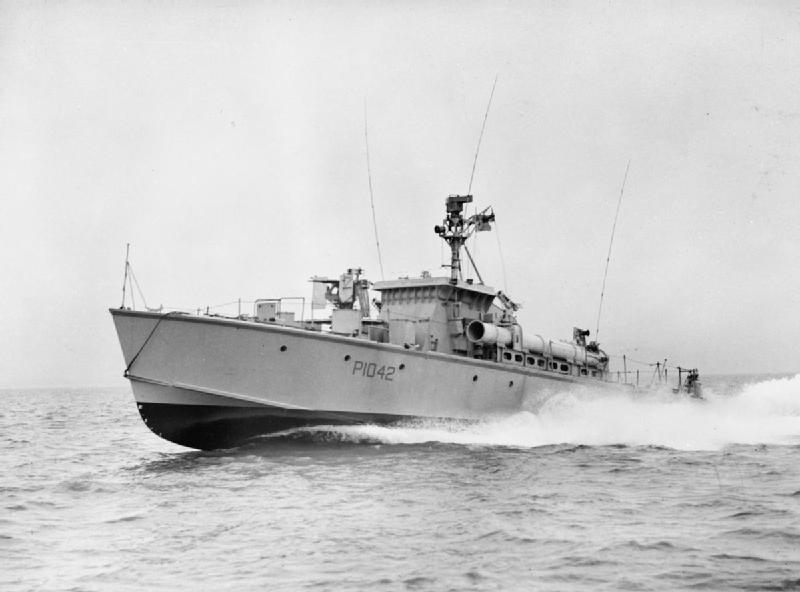
- HMS Gay Bombardier, a ship of the same class as Gay Bruiser

History

United Kingdom
- Name: HMS Gay Bruiser
- Builder: Vosper & Company
- Launched: 19 December 1952
- Identification: Pennant number: P1044

General characteristics
- Class & type: Gay-class fast patrol boat
- Displacement: 50 long tons (51 t) (standard); 65 long tons (66 t) (deep)
- Length: 75 feet 2 inches (22.9 m)
- Beam: 20 feet 1 inch (6.1 m)
- Draught: 4 feet 2 inches (1.3 m)
- Propulsion: 3 × V12 Packard engines; 1,500 hp
- Speed: 40 knots (74 km/h; 46 mph)
- Complement: 13
- Armament: Either: 2 × 40 mm guns; 2 × 21-inch torpedoes; Or: 1 × 4.5-inch gun; 1 × 40 mm gun

HMS Gay Bruiser was a Gay-class fast patrol boat of the Royal Navy. She was built by Vosper, Portchester, and launched on 19 December 1952. She was the third ship to be launched in her class.

The ship was reported to have been at the Wessex Power Units Yard during the early 1960s.
