= HMS Gay Archer =

British Gay Class Patrol Boat

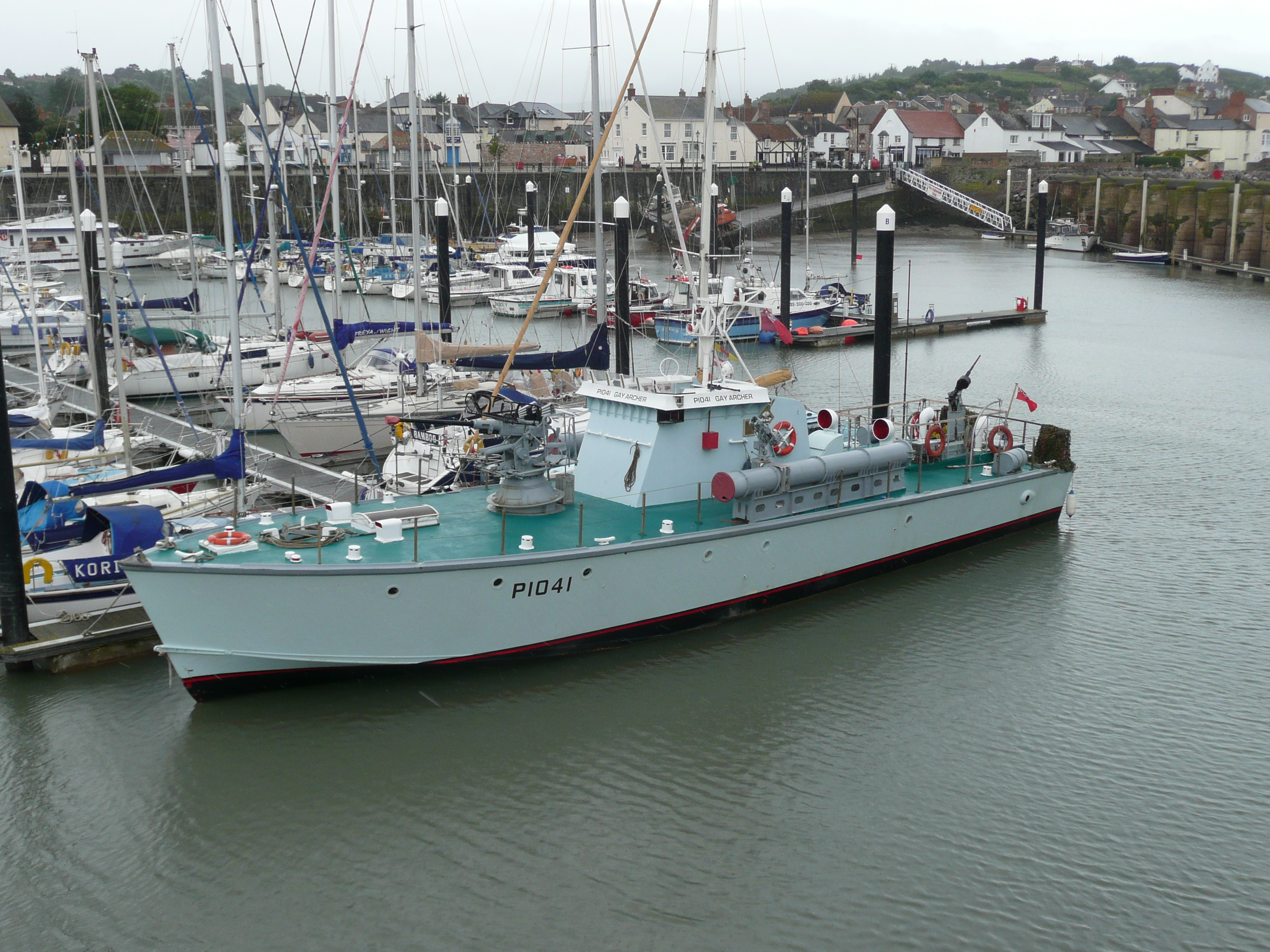
- Gay Archer, restored in Watchet harbour, England

History

United Kingdom
- Name: HMS Gay Archer
- Builder: Vosper & Company
- Launched: 20 August 1952
- Identification: Pennant number: P1041
- Status: In private ownership since 1963; restored gradually since 2005

General characteristics
- Class & type: Gay-class fast patrol boat
- Displacement: 50 tons
- Length: 75 feet 2 inches (22.9 m)
- Beam: 20 feet 1 inch (6.1 m)
- Draught: 4 feet 2 inches (1.3 m)
- Propulsion: 3 × Packard 4M-2500 marine engines
- Speed: 43 knots (80 km/h; 49 mph)
- Complement: 12
- Armament: 2 × 21-in torpedo tubes with twin Oerlikons, later replaced by a single 40 mm Bofors Mk 7

HMS Gay Archer was a Gay-class fast patrol boat of the Royal Navy. She was built by Vosper, Portchester, and launched on 20 August 1952.

== History ==
She was the first of twelve vessels of the Gay-class fast patrol boats. Whilst on delivery from Vosper to the Royal Navy, her hull was punctured. During her time with the Royal Navy, she was nearly sunk on two occasions. Whilst in Aarhus Harbour, Denmark on 18 May 1953 she was alongside MTB P1023, which caught fire and exploded. The second occasion happened when she was returning to Southsea after a search and rescue mission. She fouled a submerged broken boom defence pylon and her casing was holed, she was saved by an admiralty tug which responded to her mayday call.

== End of RN service ==
During the 1950s she operated with submarine detection equipment, and prior to being sold, she operated from Malta. She was sold to Cottness Iron Co., Wishaw on 24 July 1963.

== Restoration ==
She has been gradually restored since 2005 by Paul Childs, and was bought for the sum of just £1.

== Location ==
HMS Gay Archer, as of late 2019, resides on the River Avon, at Shirehampton (Bristol)

== See also ==
- HMS Archer
