= Scimitar-class fast training boat =

Class overview
- Builders: Vosper Thornycroft
- Operators: Royal Navy
- Preceded by: Brave class
- Built: 1969–1971
- In service: 1970–1981
- Completed: 3
- Retired: 3

General characteristics
- Type: Patrol boat
- Displacement: 102 long tons (104 t)
- Length: 100 ft 0 in (30.48 m)
- Beam: 26 ft 8 in (8.13 m)
- Draught: 6 ft 5 in (1.96 m)
- Propulsion: 2 × Rolls-Royce Proteus gas turbines, 8,500 shp (6,300 kW); 2 × Foden diesel engines, 240 bhp (180 kW); CODAG arrangement; 2 shafts
- Speed: 40 knots (74 km/h; 46 mph)
- Range: 425 nmi (787 km; 489 mi) at 35 kn (65 km/h; 40 mph)
- Complement: 12

The Scimitar class was a class of three unarmed fast patrol boats operated by the British Royal Navy for the training purposes in the 1970s. They were built by Vosper Thornycroft in 1969 to 1971 and were withdrawn from use in 1981.

== Design ==
While the Royal Navy abandoned the idea of large scale coastal forces in 1957, it maintained a small force of three boats, the Coastal Forces Trials and Special Service Squadron, to maintain proficiency in operations of fast patrol boats if the need arose in the future, and to act as targets for training the fleet in tactics against hostile fast patrol boats. The force consisted of the only two Brave-class patrol boats to be completed along with one Dark-class boat.

In January 1969, an order was placed with Vosper Thornycroft for three fast training boats to replace the Braves and remaining Dark-class boats in the training role. The design chosen was a smaller derivative of the Brave-class design.

The ships were 100 feet 0 inches (30.48 m) long between perpendiculars and about 106 feet 0 inches (32.31 m) overall, with a beam of 26 feet 8 inches (8.13 m) and a draught of 6 feet 5 inches (1.96 m). The ships' hulls were of laminated wood construction. A transom flap was fitted to the ship's stern to improve speed and trim at high speed. Displacement was 80 long tons (81 t) normal and 102 long tons (104 t) deep load. Propulsion was by two Rolls-Royce Proteus gas turbine engines rated at a total of 8,500 shaft horsepower (6,300 kW) and two Foden diesel engines rated at 240 brake horsepower (180 kW) arranged in a combined diesel and gas (CODAG) arrangement and driving two propeller shafts. This gave a maximum speed of 40 knots (74 km/h; 46 mph). They had a range of 425 nautical miles (787 km; 489 mi) at 35 knots (65 km/h; 40 mph) or 1,500 nautical miles (2,800 km; 1,700 mi) at 11.5 knots (21.3 km/h; 13.2 mph). Complement was two officers and ten ratings.

The ships were unarmed, but were designed so that a gun or missile armament could be fitted if needed, while a third Proteus could be added for improved speed.

== Service ==
The three boats were built at Vosper Thornycroft's Portchester yard from 1969 to 1971. Once initial teething problems associated with the settings for the transom flap were resolved, the boats met performance requirements. They served in the training role at Portland, with one boat (Scimitar) being sent to Hong Kong in 1979 for patrol duties, helping to intercept Vietnamese boat people and other migrants arriving by sea. The three boats were laid up ashore and put on the disposal list in 1981, and were later sold to Greek buyers. Scimitar has since been transformed in a floating restaurant, currently anchored in the port of Fano, Italy. It has been heavily modified and the only original part of the ship that has been preserved is the hull.

== Ships ==
Name	Number	Launched	Commissioned
Scimitar	P 271	4 December 1969	19 July 1970
Cutlass	P 274	19 February 1970	12 November 1970
Sabre	P 275	21 April 1970	5 March 1971

== Bibliography ==
- Blackman, Raymond V. B., ed. (1962). Jane's Fighting Ships 1962–63. London: Sampson Low, Marston & Company.
- Brown, David K.; Moore, George (2012). Rebuilding the Royal Navy: Warship Design Since 1945. Barnsley, UK: Seaforth Publishing. ISBN 978-1-84832-150-2.
- Gardiner, Robert; Chumbley, Stephen, eds. (1995). Conway's All The World's Fighting Ships 1947–1995. Annapolis, Maryland, US: Naval Institute Press. ISBN 1-55750-132-7.
- Moore, John, ed. (1979). Jane's Fighting Ships 1979–80. London: Jane's Yearbooks. ISBN 0-354-00587-1.
