= HM Motor Gun Boat 501 =

Gunboat of the Royal Navy

History

United Kingdom
- Name: MGB 501
- Builder: Camper & Nicholson (Gosport)
- Completed: 1942
- Fate: Sank after an internal explosion, off Lands End, on 27 July 1942

General characteristics
- Class & type: Motor gunboat
- Displacement: 95 long tons (97 t) deep load
- Length: 117 ft (36 m)
- Beam: 19 ft 6 in (5.94 m)
- Draught: 4 ft 6 in (1.37 m) fully laden
- Propulsion: 3 × shaft petrol engines; 3,750 bhp (2,800 kW)
- Speed: 32 knots (59 km/h) (max); 29 knots (54 km/h) (cruising)
- Range: 2,000 nautical miles (3,700 km) at 11 kn (20 km/h)
- Complement: 21
- Armament: Designed: 1 × 3-pounder gun; 1 × 2-pounder gun; 2 × 21-inch torpedo tubes; Actual: 1 × 2-pounder gun (MkVIII mounting); 1 × 20mm Oerlikon; 4 × .5 inch Vickers machine guns; 2 × 21-inch torpedo tubes; 12 x depth charges
- Notes: Cocker, Maurice (2006). Coastal Forces Vessels of the Royal Navy from 1865. Stroud: Tempus Publ. p. 121. ISBN 9780752438627.

HM Motor Gun Boat 501 was a motor gunboat operated by Royal Navy Coastal Forces during the Second World War. The design, prepared by Bill Holt of the DNC's Boat Section, was unusual for a British light coastal forces' boat at the time in that it was of composite construction, whereas most MTBs and Motor Launches were entirely wooden-hulled. MGB 501's frames and various internal members were steel, with layers of diagonal wooden planking forming the exterior skin of the hull and wood for the remaining decks & bulkheads.

She was initially designed as a combined anti-submarine boat and motor torpedo boat, but was completed as a Motor Gun Boat. Based on the lessons of combat experience with the early MA/SBs following their conversion to MGBs, MGB 501's initial designed gun armament, which would have included a 2-pdr Rolls gun, was replaced with a suite that would have provided greater reliability and volume of fire in battle (a Vickers pom-pom and an Oerlikon cannon). Retaining her 21-inch torpedo tubes, she therefore completed for service as a combined motor gun & torpedo boat (much like the 'E' boats or schnellboote) whilst being designated purely as an MGB.

== Loss ==
HM MGB 501 was lost off Land's End on 27 July 1942, after an internal explosion.

== Notes ==
- Gardiner, Robert and Chesneau, Roger, Conway's All the World's Fighting Ships 1922–1946, Conway Maritime Press, 1980. ISBN 0-83170-303-2.
