= Dark-class patrol boat =

UK naval vessels

Class overview
- Name: Dark class
- Builders: Saunders-Roe; Vosper & Company; Taylor, Chertsey; McGruer & Co Ltd, Clynder; Miller, St.Monance; Thornycroft; Morgan Giles, Teignmouth
- Operators: Royal Navy; Myanmar Navy; Finnish Navy; Japan Maritime Self-Defense Force
- Preceded by: Gay class
- Succeeded by: Brave class
- Built: 1954–1958
- In commission: 1954–1971
- Planned: 35
- Completed: 26
- Canceled: 9
- Active: 0
- Retired: 26

General characteristics
- Type: Fast patrol boat
- Displacement: 50 long tons (51 t) (standard); 64 long tons (65 t) (deep)
- Length: 71 ft 8 in (21.84 m)
- Beam: 19 ft 5 in (5.92 m)
- Draught: 6 ft 1 in (1.85 m)
- Propulsion: 2 shafts, Napier Deltic 18 cylinder two-stroke opposed-piston diesels
- Speed: 40 knots (46 mph; 74 km/h)
- Complement: 15
- Armament: Either: 1 × 40 mm guns; 4 × 21-inch torpedoes; Or: 1 × 40 mm gun; 1 × 4.5-inch gun

The Dark class, or Admiralty "Type A", were a class of eighteen fast patrol boats that served with the United Kingdom's Royal Navy starting in 1954. All were named with a prefix of 'Dark'. The class could be fitted as either motor gun boats or motor torpedo boats, depending on the type of armament carried. They were the only diesel engined fast patrol boats in the Royal Navy. The class was fitted (along with the Nasty class) with the Napier Deltic two-stroke diesel engine. This was of unique layout, an opposed-piston engine with a triangular layout of three banks, 18 cylinders in total.

== Construction ==
The boats were constructed with alloy framing and wooden decks and skin. The exception was Dark Scout which had all aluminium decks, skins and frames. Originally 27 units were ordered by the admiralty from seven builders. Nine were eventually cancelled in 1955, including Dark Horseman which at the time was partially completed and on the stocks in the builders yard.

The all-aluminium version was exported to Burma (five units), Finland (two units), and Japan (one unit) by builders Saunders-Roe.

== Design ==
With no previous experience of using diesel engines in vessels of this size, it was not fully understood how dirty they would get from the exhaust fumes. Originally launched in the normal Royal Navy grey, they eventually had their hulls painted completely black to disguise the staining from exhaust emissions . For a short while, a compromise half grey/half black combination was used.

== Fate ==
An Admiralty decision in 1957 took nearly all fast patrol boats out of commission, with nine of the new Dark-class to be laid up. On 20 December 1960, the Admiralty stated that the Coastal Forces would not be completely abandoned in case it needed to be expanded in the future. A special boat squadron was nominated, but it did not include any of the Dark-class.

Several of the ships were sold to Wessex Power Units for sale onto the Italian Customs Service (8 hulls) in February 1966. Two were used for target practice, with Dark Gladiator sunk by HMS Amazon and HMS Naiad off Portland in December 1975. At least two, Dark Clipper and Dark Fighter, managed to survive up to as recently as June 2001 when they were broken up in Malta.

== Legacy ==
The Dark class would be the final commission of this quantity for patrol boats of this size and speed. The following classes had greatly reduced numbers with the Brave class numbering only two vessels and Scimitar class numbering only three.

A similar hull design was used by Saunders-Roe in a prototype, R-103, which led to the development of the experimental hydrofoil, HMCS Bras d'Or, for the Royal Canadian Navy.

== Ships ==
Operator	Name	Pennant	Builder	Launched	Fate
Royal Navy	Dark Adventurer	P1101	Saunders-Roe	28 October 1954	Sold January 1970
Royal Navy	Dark Aggressor	P1102	Saunders-Roe	9 December 1954	Sold on 3 October 1961
Royal Navy	Dark Antagonist	P1103	Saunders-Roe	11 December 1954	Sold February 1966
Royal Navy	Dark Avenger	P1105	Saunders-Roe	6 September 1955	Sold February 1966
Royal Navy	Dark Biter	P1104	Saunders-Roe	23 June 1955	Sold February 1966
Royal Navy	Dark Buccaneer	P1108	Vosper & Company	30 September 1954	Sold February 1966
Royal Navy	Dark Clipper	P1109	Vosper & Company	9 February 1955	Sold on 16 March 1967; Broken up June 2001
Royal Navy	Dark Fighter	P1113	Taylor (Chertsey)	4 October 1955	Sold on 16 March 1967; Broken up June 2001
Royal Navy	Dark Gladiator	P1114	Taylor (Chertsey)	5 December 1956	Used as target and sunk December 1975
Royal Navy	Dark Hero	P1115	McGruer (Clynder)	16 March 1957	Used as target 1977; Sold 1985
Royal Navy	Dark Highwayman	P1110	Vosper & Company	29 March 1955	Sold on 16 March 1967
Royal Navy	Dark Hunter	P1116	Miller (St. Monance)	18 March 1954	Sold on 13 April 1962
Royal Navy	Dark Hussar	P1112	Thornycroft	16 May 1957	Sold February 1966
Royal Navy	Dark Intruder	P1118	Morgan Giles (Teignmouth)	6 July 1955	Sold February 1966
Royal Navy	Dark Invader	P1119	Morgan Giles (Teignmouth)	6 September 1955	Sold February 1966
Royal Navy	Dark Killer	P1111	Thornycroft	26 September 1956	Sold February 1966
Royal Navy	Dark Rover	P1107	Vosper & Company	30 August 1954	Sold February 1966
Royal Navy	Dark Scout	P1116	Saunders-Roe	20 March 1958	Sold on 2 July 1961
Myanmar Navy		T201	Saunders-Roe	24 March 1956	Stricken 1975
Myanmar Navy		T202	Saunders-Roe		Stricken 1975
Myanmar Navy		T203	Saunders-Roe		Stricken 1975
Myanmar Navy		T204	Saunders-Roe		Stricken 1975
Myanmar Navy		T205	Saunders-Roe		Stricken 1975
Finnish Navy	Vasama I		Saunders-Roe		Stricken 1977
Finnish Navy	Vasama II		Saunders-Roe		Stricken 1979
Japan Maritime Self-Defense Force		PT9	Saunders-Roe		Stricken 1972

Cancelled ships

Operator	Name	Builder
Royal Navy	HMS Dark Attacker	Saunders-Roe
Royal Navy	HMS Dark Battler	Saunders-Roe
Royal Navy	HMS Dark Bowman	Saunders-Roe
Royal Navy	HMS Dark Chaser	Vosper & Company
Royal Navy	HMS Dark Chieftain	Vosper & Company
Royal Navy	HMS Dark Crusader	Vosper & Company
Royal Navy	HMS Dark Defender	Thornycroft
Royal Navy	HMS Dark Explorer	Thornycroft
Royal Navy	HMS Dark Horseman	McGruer (Clynder)

== See also ==
- PTF boat
