= HMS Cutlass =

Three ships of the British Royal Navy have been named HMS Cutlass after the weapon:

- HMS Cutlass (G74), a Weapon-class destroyer laid down in 1945 but cancelled before completion.
- HMS Cutlass (P274), a Scimitar-class fast training boat launched in 1968 and disposed of in 1982.
- HMS Cutlass (P295) is the first of the new Gibraltar fast patrol boats.
