= Gay-class patrol boat =

Class of Royal Navy boats

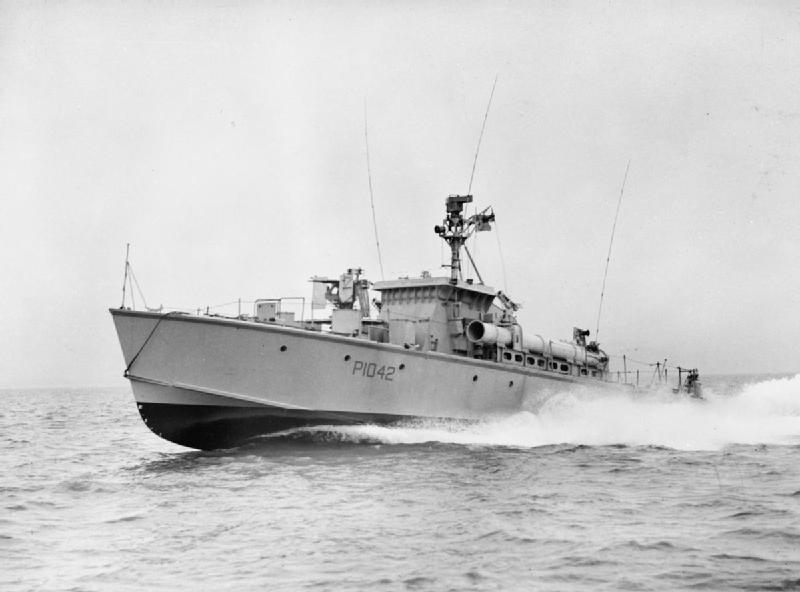
- HMS Gay Bombardier, fitted out in the motor torpedo gunboat design, undergoing trials in Portsmouth Harbour in 1953

Class overview
- Name: Gay class
- Builders: Vosper & Company; Thornycroft; Morgan Giles Ltd., Teignmouth; Taylor, Chertsey; McGruer & Co Ltd, Clynder
- Operators: Royal Navy
- Succeeded by: Dark class
- Built: 1952–1954
- In commission: 1953–1971
- Completed: 12
- Retired: 12
- Preserved: 1

General characteristics
- Type: Fast patrol boat
- Displacement: 50 long tons (51 t) (standard); 65 long tons (66 t) (deep)
- Length: 75 ft 2 in (22.91 m)
- Beam: 20 ft 1 in (6.12 m)
- Draught: 4 ft 1 in (1.24 m)
- Propulsion: 3 × V12 Packard engines; 1,500 hp
- Speed: 40 knots (46 mph; 74 km/h)
- Complement: 13
- Armament: Either: 2 × Bofors 40mm guns; 2 × 21-inch torpedoes; Or: 1 × 4.5-inch gun; 1 × 40mm gun

The Gay class were a class of twelve fast patrol boats that served with the Royal Navy from the early 1950s. All were named after types of soldiers or military or related figures, prefixed with 'Gay'. The class could be fitted as either motor gun boats or motor torpedo boats, depending on the type of armament they carried.

== Design ==
They were developments of the MTB 538/539 class that had served during the Second World War, and were intended to be an interim measure until the diesel-powered Dark-class fast patrol boats could be introduced. The vessels were to be powered by three V12 Packard 4M-2500 engines, each providing 1,500 horsepower (1,100 kW) and a speed of 40 knots (74 km/h; 46 mph). The Gays were the last petrol powered warships to be built for the Royal Navy. Those fitted as Motor Torpedo Boats received two 40-millimetre (1.6 in) guns and two 21-inch (533 mm) torpedoes, while those classified as Motor Gun Boats received a single 4.5 in (114 mm) gun and a 40 mm gun.

== Construction ==
The class was ordered between February and May 1951 from a number of shipyards across Britain, many of whom had built similar ships for the navy during the Second World War. Four were built by Vosper & Company, two by Thornycroft, two by Morgan Giles, of Teignmouth, two by Taylor, of Chertsey and two by McGruer & Co Ltd, of Clynder. They were launched between 1952 and 1954, with the last of the class, Gay Forester, being launched in March 1954.

== Careers ==
Most of the vessels served for a decade before being retired and sold off, though the longest-lived, Gay Charioteer, was only sold off in 1971, after nearly 20 years in service. She had been a High Speed Target Towing vessel at HMNB Devonport since 1959, until being put into reserve in 1964. HMS Gay Charger was commanded by Nigel Lawson during his National Service. Gay Dragoon appeared as 1087 in The Ship That Died of Shame, a film based on a book by Nicholas Monsarrat and starring Richard Attenborough. Gay Fencer became a target vessel and was sunk off Portland in 1968, while Gay Archer was damaged while being delivered to the Navy, and then damaged when a vessel she was moored next to exploded. She then struck a submerged boom and nearly sank off Southsea Pier. She was sold out of the navy in 1963, but survived to be restored as the only remaining member of her class.

== Ships ==
Name	Pennant	Builder	Launched	Fate
Gay Archer	P1041	Vosper	20 August 1952	Sold on 24 July 1963
Gay Bombardier	P1042	Vosper	28 August 1952	Sold on 26 July 1963
Gay Bowman	P1043	Vosper	6 November 1952	Sold on 24 July 1963
Gay Bruiser	P1044	Vosper	19 December 1952	Sold on 31 January 1962
Gay Caribineer	P1045	Thornycroft	22 January 1953	Sold on 31 July 1963
Gay Cavalier	P1046	Taylor	23 January 1953	Sold on 25 July 1963
Gay Centurion	P1047	Thornycroft	3 September 1952	Sold on 31 January 1962
Gay Charger	P1048	Morgan Giles	12 January 1953	Sold in January 1967
Gay Charioteer	P1049	Morgan Giles	12 June 1953	For disposal on 14 November 1971
Gay Dragoon	P1050	Taylor	28 January 1953	Sold on 31 January 1962
Gay Fencer	P1051	McGruer & Co Ltd	18 February 1953	Sunk on 10 April 1968
Gay Forester	P1052	McGruer & Co Ltd	23 March 1954	Sold on 31 January 1962

During the Second World War the Royal Navy also sailed HMS Gay Viking and HMS Gay Corsair, a pair of motor gun boats. These were superficially similar to the later Gay-class, although their primary armament was a mixture of QF 6-pounder Hotchkiss, Oerlikon 20 mm cannon, and depth charges. Both had left service by the top of the Gay-class' introduction.
