= Brave-class patrol boat =

1960 class of British fast patrol boats

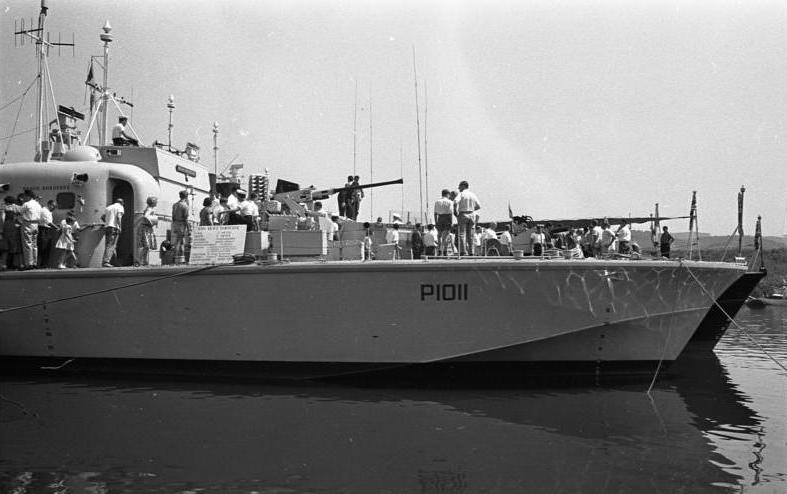
- HMS Brave Borderer on the Rhine, 1961

Class overview
- Name: Brave class
- Builders: Vosper & Company, Portchester
- Operators: Royal Navy
- Preceded by: Dark class
- Built: 1958–1960
- In commission: 1960–1970
- Completed: 2
- Retired: 2

General characteristics
- Class & type: Motor torpedo boat
- Displacement: 89 long tons (90 t) standard; 114 long tons (116 t) full load
- Length: 90 ft (27 m) wl 98 ft 10 in (30.12 m) overall
- Beam: 25 ft 6 in (7.77 m)
- Draught: 7 ft (2.1 m)
- Propulsion: 2 × Rover auxiliary gas turbine turbo generators; 3 × Bristol Proteus gas turbines; 10,500 hp (7,830 kW)
- Speed: 52 knots (96 km/h; 60 mph) maximum 46 knots (85 km/h; 53 mph) continuous
- Range: 400 nmi (740 km; 460 mi)
- Complement: 20 (3 officers, 17 ratings)
- Armament: As Motor Torpedo Boat; 1 × Bofors 40 mm gun; 4 × 21 in (533 mm) torpedo tubes; As Motor Gun Boat; 2 × Bofors 40 mm guns; 2 × 21 in (533 mm) torpedo tubes

The Brave-class fast patrol boats were a class of two gas turbine motor torpedo boats (MTBs) that were the last of their type for the Royal Navy (RN) Coastal Forces division. They formed the basis for a series of simpler boats which were widely built for export.

At the time of their introduction the Braves were the fastest naval vessels in the world.

== Brave class ==
The Brave class followed the Dark class of convertible motor torpedo boats/gunboats. They were larger than the Dark class, and differed in being powered by gas turbine engines rather than the diesel engines of the Dark class. (Gas turbine propulsion had been tested in the Bold class of two experimental fast patrol boats). Three Bristol Proteus engines propelled the Braves to a maximum of 52 knots (96 km/h; 60 mph). Like the Dark class, the Braves had a mahogany skin over aluminium frame construction. They were built to be able to be used as either motor torpedo boats or motor gun boats. For the former role they had a 40 mm Bofors gun, four 21-inch (533 mm) torpedoes and two depth charges, in the latter two 40 mm guns and two torpedoes. It was planned to arm the ships with a new 3.3-inch (84 mm) gun based on the 20-pounder tank gun in a stabilised mounting, but this was abandoned.

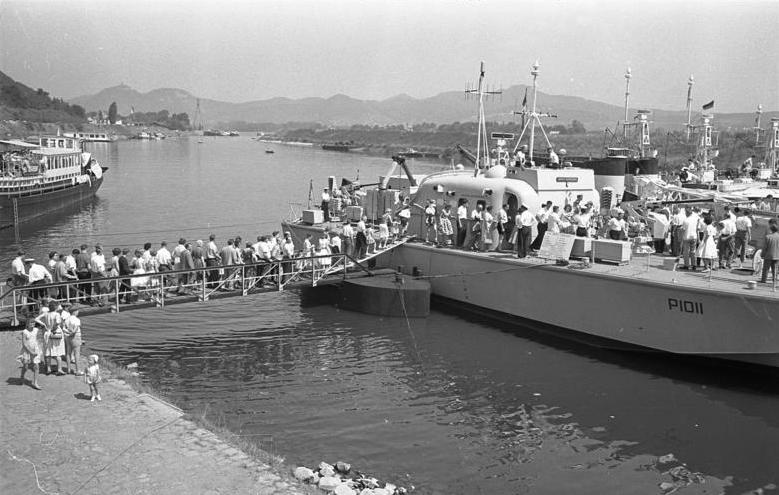
Visitors boarding HMS Brave Borderer at Oberwinter, Germany, 1961

The Royal Navy abandoned the idea of large scale coastal forces in 1957, so only two Braves were built for the Royal Navy. The two Braves, along with a single member of the Dark class, formed the Coastal Forces Trials and Special Service Squadron, based at Gosport. These were used to maintain proficiency in Coastal Forces operations, also being used as targets and for fishery protection. The two Braves were retired from use in 1970.

== Ferocity and derivatives ==
The Braves were expensive boats, so as a private venture, Vospers produced a simpler derivative, Ferocity. This was smaller than the Braves, with an overall length of 90 feet 8 inches (27.64 m) and was powered by two Proteus engines instead of three, which were supplemented by two diesel engines for cruising. Construction was all wooden to minimise costs. Despite the reduced size and power, performance and armament were similar to the Braves. While Ferocity herself was not sold, it formed the basis for a number of boats for export. These included sales to West Germany (two, called the Vosper class), Denmark (six of the Søløven class), Greece, Malaysia for the RMN in 1966 (four craft), Brunei and Libya, and was also the basis for the Scimitar-class fast training boat.

== Boats in class ==
The two RN craft were both built by Vospers at Portchester:

- HMS Brave Borderer (P1011), launched on 7 January 1958 and commissioned on 26 January 1960
- HMS Brave Swordsman (P1012), launched 22 May 1958 and commissioned on 20 July 1960

At the end of their life they were sold to the Haydon-Baillie aircraft museum.

HMS Brave Borderer was the subject of an attack by the IRA in 1965. Royal Navy ships had begun to visit Ireland on friendship visits, but Republicans objected to their presence, and members of the IRA's Kilkenny Brigade, led by Richard Behal, determined to make a political point by attacking one of the vessels (it was not their intention to kill any crew). On 10 September 1965, as HMS Brave Borderer was departing Waterford down the River Suir for the sea, she was fired upon using a World War 2-vintage Boys anti-tank rifle which blew two holes in the side of the vessel's stern. The vessel went to full speed and was out of range before any more rounds could be fired; there were no casualties, but the vessel had to return to Vospers for several months of repairs.

== Export ==
=== Denmark ===
Badge of Swedish motor torpedo boats

Denmark purchased six Søløven-class fast patrol boats, with the larger hull form and the 3-Proteus powerplant of the Brave class and the wooden construction of Ferocity. Armament consisted of two 40 mm Bofors guns and four torpedoes. The first two boats, Søløven and Søridderen were built by Vospers (with Søløven being paid for by the United States and hence given the nominal US designation PT-821), with the remaining four boats being built under license by the Royal Dockyard, Copenhagen. They were placed into reserve in 1988, and disposed of when the Flyvefisken-class patrol vessels entered service, with disposal complete by 1992.

Name	Number	Laid down	Launched	Commissioned	Fate
Søløven	P 510	27 August 1962	19 April 1963	12 February 1965	Decommissioned 5 July 1990
Søridderen	P 511	4 October 1962	22 Aug 1963	10 February 1965	Decommissioned 5 July 1990
Søbjørnen	P 512	9 July 1963	19 August 1964	20 October 1965	Decommissioned 5 July 1990
Søhesten	P 513	5 September 1963	31 March 1965	21 June 1966	Decommissioned 5 July 1990
Søhunden	P 514	18 August 1964	12 January 1966	20 December 1966	Decommissioned 5 July 1990
Søulven	P 515	30 March 1965	27 April 1966	17 May 1967	Decommissioned 5 July 1990

One of the Søløven-class boats, apparently in a derelict state, was auctioned in Belgium from 12 to 24 February 2016, being moored alongside another in Antwerp harbour. Another "Søløven"-class, Søbjørnen is a museum vessel at the maritime museum in Aalborg.

=== West Germany ===
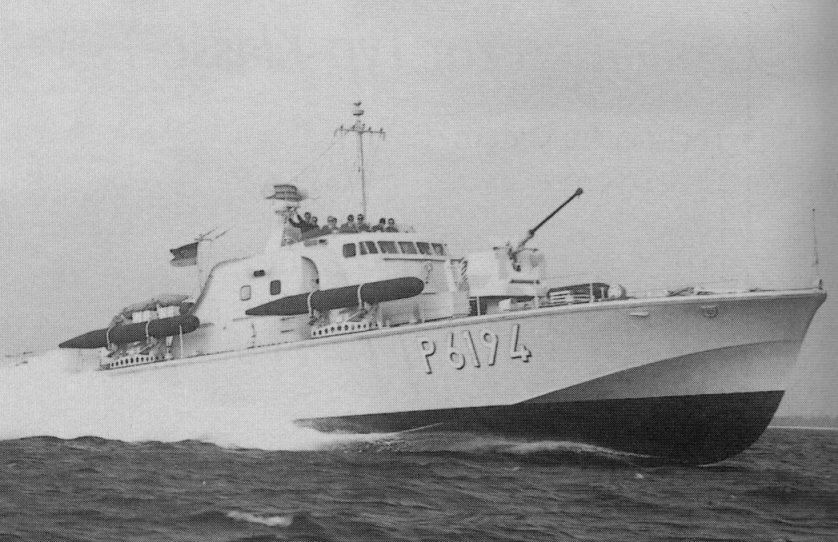
German Strahl in 1965

West Germany ordered two fast patrol boats (both designated Type 153) from Vospers on 22 August 1960. The first, Strahl was based on the Brave class, with three Proteus gas turbines, while Pfeil was based on the smaller Ferocity with two Proteus. Armament was the same convertible combination of Bofors 40 mm guns and torpedoes as the Brave class, with the option of replacing the torpedoes with eight mines. They were transferred to Greece in 1967.

Name	Number	Launched	Commissioned	Fate
Pfeil	P 6193	26 October 1961	27 June 1962	To Greece 1967 as Aiolos (P19). Discarded 1976
Strahl	P 6194	10 January 1962	21 November 1962	To Greece 1967 as Astrapi (P 20). Discarded 1979

=== Libya ===
In October 1966, Libya ordered three fast patrol boats of the Susa class from Vospers based on the Danish Søløven class, with the wooden construction of Ferocity but a larger hull powered by three Proteus engines. Armament consisted of eight SS.12 wire-guided anti-ship missiles and two 40 mm Bofors guns.

Name	Number	Launched	Commissioned	Fate
Susa	P 512	31 August 1967		
Sirte	P 513	10 January 1968		
Sebha (originally Sokna)	P 514	29 February 1968		

=== Malaysia ===
The Royal Malaysian Navy ordered four Perkasa-class fast patrol craft on 22 October 1964 to be designed and built by Vospers. The design was similar to the Danish Søløven class, with a large (30.4 metres (99 ft 9 in)) wooden hull with an aluminium superstructure and powered by three Proteus engines. The original armament was four torpedoes (which could be swapped for 10 mines), a single 40 mm Bofors gun forward and a twin 20 mm Oerlikon cannon mount aft. The four boats were delivered in 1967 and re-armed with eight SS-12 missiles in 1971.

- KD Perkasa P150
- KD Handalan P151
- KD Gempita P152
- KD Pendekar P153

=== Brunei ===
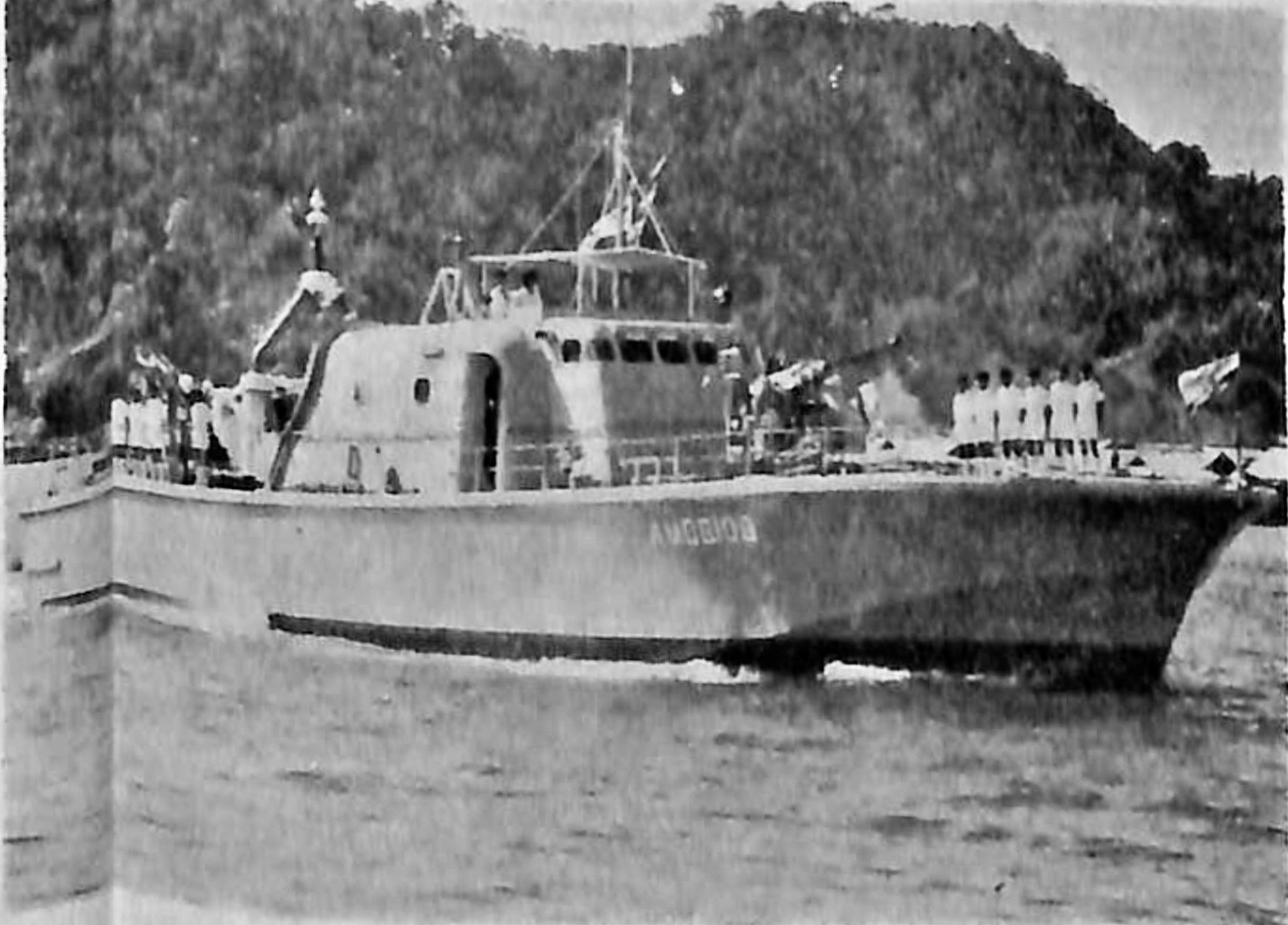
KDB Pahlawan (P01) on patrol in 1969.

A single boat of the class was purchased by Brunei Darussalam for the Boat Company of the Royal Brunei Malay Regiment (the forerunner to the Royal Brunei Navy proper), commissioned in 1968, she became their first ship, named KDB Pahlawan (P01), originally identified as AMDB 100.
