= HMS Bee =

Three vessels and two shore establishments of the Royal Navy have been named HMS Bee, after the insect, the bee. A third ship was ordered but never completed:

== Ships ==
- HMS Bee was a 79-foot schooner gunboat of 30 1/2 tonnes displacement, stationed at the Royal Navy's Penetanguishene Naval Establishment serving on the Upper Great Lakes from 1817 to 1831. A replica of her was launched in 1984 at the reconstructed naval dockyard and now resides at the "Discovery Harbour" provincial historic site along with the 175-ton topsail schooner HMS Tecumseth in Penetanguishene, Ontario.
- HMS Bee (1842) was a paddle vessel, built of wood and launched in 1842 as a tender to the Royal Academy, Portsmouth. She had additional screw propulsion fitted in 1844, making her the second screw vessel in the Royal Navy. (The first screw vessel in navy service was HMS Dwarf.) Bee was broken up in 1874.
- HMS Bee (1915) was an Insect-class gunboat launched in 1915 and sold in 1939.
- HMS Bee was to have been a Dragonfly-class river gunboat. She was ordered in 1939, but cancelled in 1940.

== Shore establishments ==
- HMS Bee was a Coastal Forces work up base at Weymouth in commission between 1942 and 1943.
- HMS Bee was a Coastal Forces work up base at Holyhead, taking over from the previous base in 1943 and being paid off in 1945.

== See also ==
- HMS Beecroft, a naval base in Nigeria between 1960 and 1978.
- HMS Beehive, a Coastal Forces base at Felixstowe between 1940 and 1945.
