= Motor gunboat =

British Second World War small high-speed military vessel

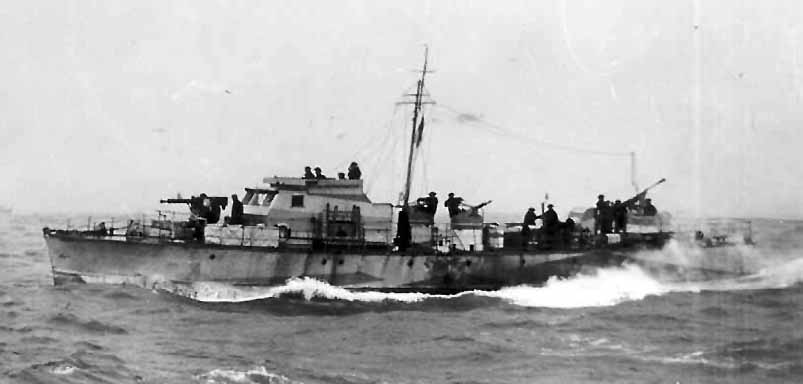
MGB 314, a Fairmile C motor gun boat, during World War II

The motor gunboat (MGB) was a small, high-speed British military vessel of the Second World War, which was armed with a mix of guns, in contrast to the physically similar motor torpedo boat (MTB), whose main offensive weapon were torpedoes. The small size of the MGBs, and their high speed, made them difficult targets for German E-boats, though, like their opponents, they were limited by heavy weather, because they did not provide a stable-enough platform to aim the guns. The large number of guns required a relatively large crew, numbering as high as thirty men on the largest boats.

== Description ==
MGBs were extremely heavily armed for vessels of their size. Early MGBs were, nevertheless, small boats, being based on motor anti-submarine boats of 63–70 feet (19–21 m) in length; these would later be considered 'short' boats by the Royal Navy Coastal Forces. These were mostly equipped with one heavy weapon and numerous lighter guns. The later 71.5 feet (21.8 m) short MGBs would have two heavy weapon locations (a 2-pound (0.91 kg) naval gun forward and twin 20mm Oerlikon aft), outmatching contemporary enemy boats of larger size. The outstanding feature of most short MGBs was their very high speed of 36–40 kn (67–74 km/h; 41–46 mph), enabling them to work with, or in place of, MTBs on offensive sweeps.

From June 1941, the Fairmile Type 'C' MGB began to join Coastal Forces; this boat was based on the earlier Type 'A' motor launch and was the first of the 'long boats', being 110 feet (34 m) long. A major feature of the long MGBs was that they carried two heavy guns as well as numerous lighter weapons; the 27 kn (50 km/h; 31 mph) Type 'C' began to introduce the versatile and hard-hitting Vickers pom-pom to Coastal Forces' inventory, as well as carrying one Rolls-Royce 2-pdr gun (40 mm) on the aft bandstand.

In March 1942, the first of the Fairmile 'D's joined the MGB force, this type becoming the main long MGB for the remainder of the conflict. These had room for an even heavier armament than the Type 'C' and the weight of armament was incrementally increased as the war went on. Early models had one powered pom-pom mount forward, twin powered 20mm aft, and two twin heavy machine guns by the bridge plus light machine guns, but more often placed the 20mm twin mount amidships and added a QF 6-pdr gun (57 mm) aft. By 1945, MGB 658 carried two power-mounted QF 6-pounders in the A and Y turret positions, a twin 20 mm Oerlikon cannon in the X turret position, a single 20 mm Oerlikon on either side forward of the bridge, and two twin .303 Vickers machine guns on the bridge wings. They were also equipped with smoke-making equipment, basic radar and depth charges.

== Service ==
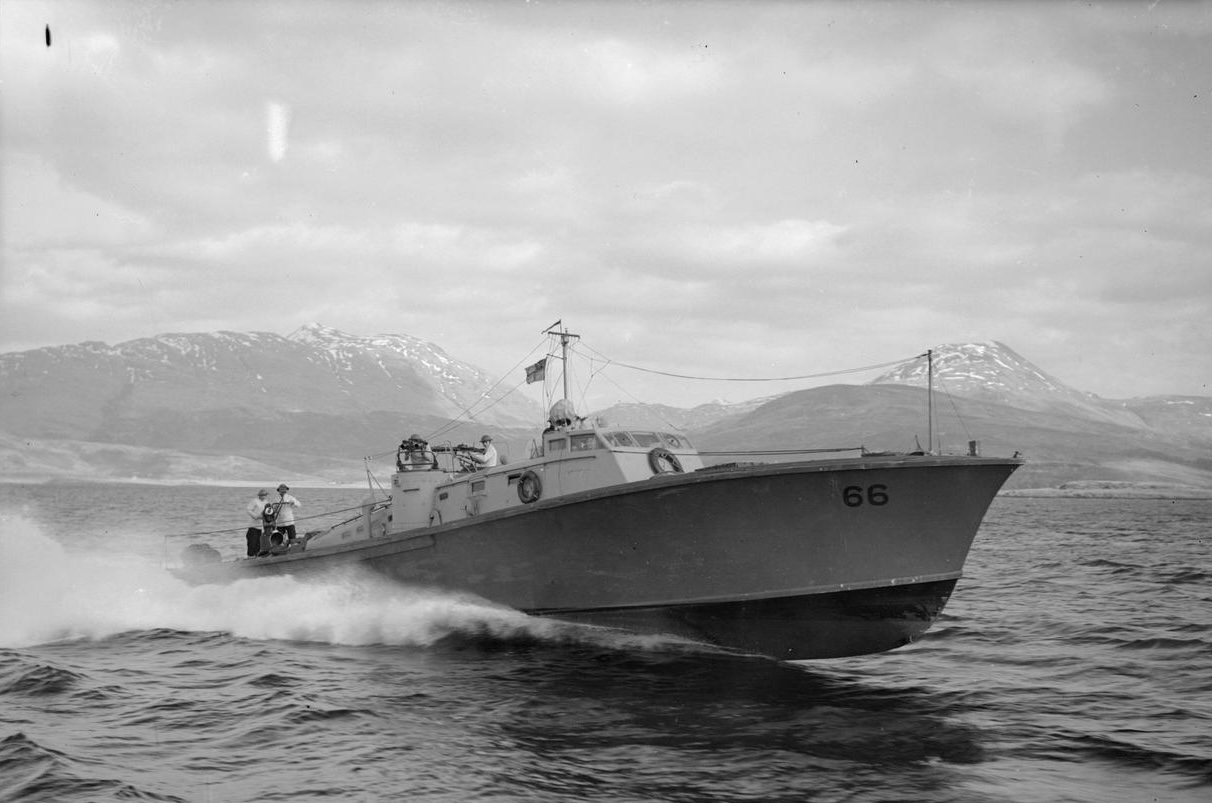
MGB 66 at speed with the crew at action stations, off the coast of Scotland

In the early years of the war, MGBs saw action defending shipping against enemy torpedo boats, such as the German E-boats, on the southern and eastern coasts of the UK, with the faster 'short' boats frequently undertaking patrols hunting for the enemy. MGB flotillas (particularly under Robert Hichens' command) also developed the tactic of accompanying MTBs on their patrols across the North Sea to attack enemy coastal shipping. On these missions, the MGBs' role was to close stealthily with the enemy and then attack with guns from an unexpected quarter, drawing the convoy escort's attention, while the MTBs manoeuvred into position unseen by the Germans, so as to better attack the protected convoy shipping with their torpedoes.

The larger and heavier Type 'C' were slower than the short boats, so that they were assigned much more frequently to defensive and convoy escort duties, and clandestine work such as extraction of Allied agents/escapees from occupied France. Robert Ryder used a Type 'C' MGB for command of the 'Operation Chariot' St Nazaire commando raid; he and William Savage, the gunner of the unprotected two-pounder gun on MGB 314, received Victoria Crosses for their part in the raid, Savage posthumously. In the Mediterranean, MGBs were used in an attacking role to sink Italian and German shipping. They were formed into flotillas which often operated alongside motor torpedo boats (or US PT boats) and helped interdict supplies being sent from Italy to Axis forces in North Africa in 1943. After that campaign, they moved northwards and assisted with the invasion of Sicily, Sardinia, Corsica and Elba. Operating from island bases they patrolled along the western coast of Italy, attacking small coastal ships and E-boats until mid-1944. As Italy was progressively liberated, certain flotillas, such as the 56th, were sent around Italy to the Adriatic to assist partisans in the islands off Yugoslavia.

MGBs were also involved in the protection of shipping after D-Day.

MGBs used the prefix "HMMGB" on formal occasions (as boats, rather than the "HMS" of ships). Crews usually referred to them by their numbers.

In 1947, MGB 2009 was fitted with a Metrovick gas turbine, thereby becoming the world's first gas turbine-powered naval vessel.

== Types ==
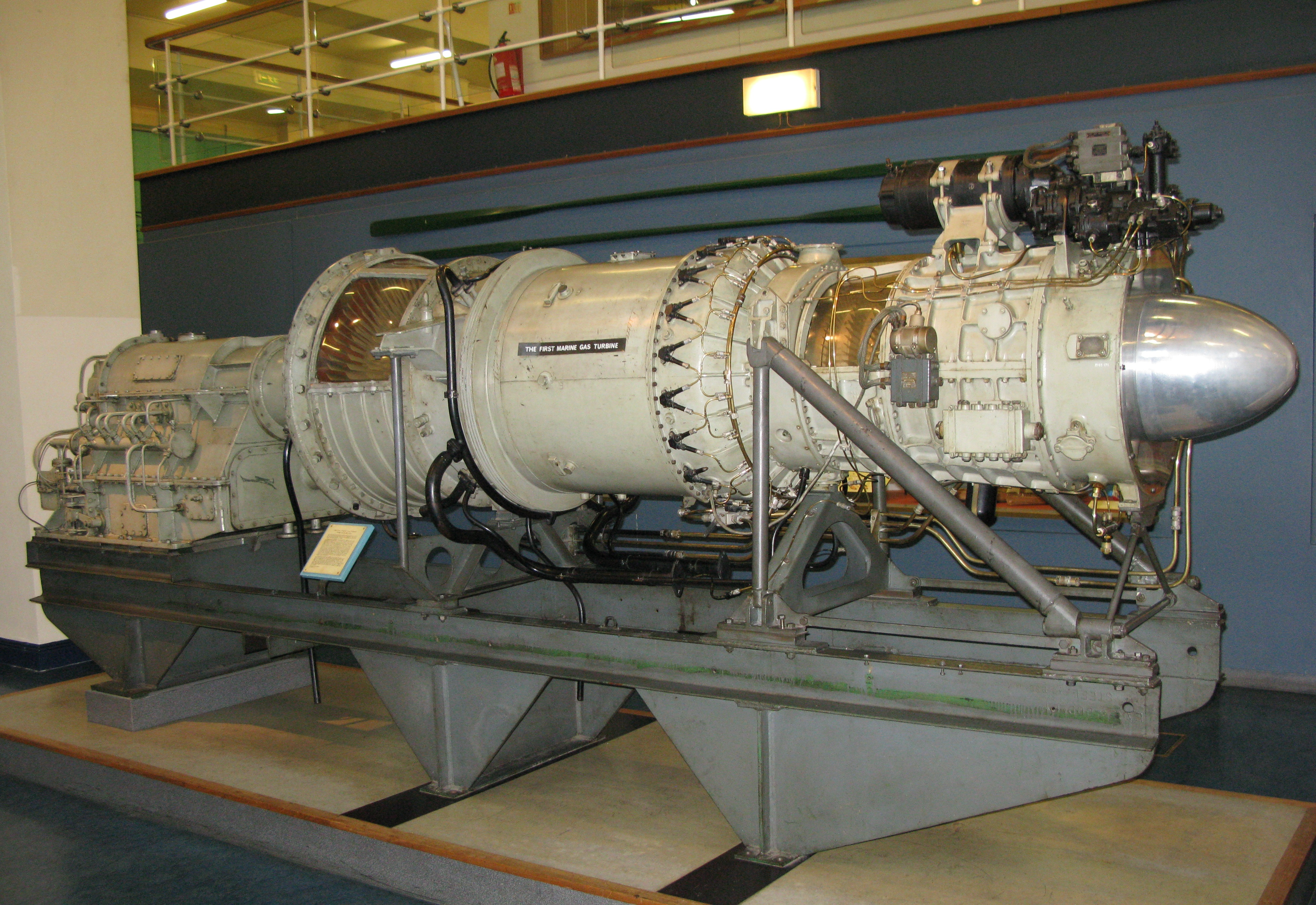
The gas turbine from MGB 2009 (formerly MGB 509)

=== British Power Boats ===
Early-war motor anti-submarine boats (MA/SBs) built by BPB Co. were converted from early 1941 into MGBs. These included 63-foot (19 m) and 70-foot (21 m) types.

63-foot (19 m) MGBs (numbered 40–45) were of 24 t standard displacement and powered by 2-shaft Rolls-Royce petrol engines developing 2,200bhp for a top speed of 40 kn (74 km/h; 46 mph). They were rearmed for the MGB role with 1 × 20 mm Oerlikon aft (some may have briefly carried a 40 mm Rolls-Royce gun until the Oerlikon was available), a twin heavy machine gun turret on the coach-house roof and two to four .303-inch (7.62 mm) machine guns (two twin mounts would be mounted abreast the wheelhouse).

The 70-foot (21 m) MGBs were of several different original batches or types: MGB numbers 6 to 21 originally had 3-shaft Napier petrol engines giving 1,650 bhp in total and a top speed of 27 kn (50 km/h; 31 mph), being later refitted with Packards for 3,600 bhp and 38 kts, while MGB 46 and MGBs 50 to 67 had 3-shaft Rolls-Royce installations for 3,300 bhp and a top speed of 36.7 kts. All were of 28–30 t std displacement. Individual armament varied, but most boats had two twin HMG turrets abreast the bridge (some early models had the single dorsal turret seen on the 63-foot (19 m) type); in the case of ex-French boats such as MGB 66 these turrets replaced a pair of twin .303 inch (7.62 mm) turrets which had been carried side by side amidships. Heavier gun armament on these boats, located aft, was initially either a 2-pdr (40 mm) Rolls-Royce gun, or, less commonly, a Boulton & Paul quadruple .303-inch (7.62 mm)MG turret. Surviving boats were later rearmed with a far more effective Oerlikon in the aft position.

71.5-foot (21.8 m) Motor Gun Boat
BPB built 34 purpose-built 72-foot (22 m) MGBs (also referred to as 7.5-foot (2.3 m)). Capable of 40 kn (74 km/h; 46 mph), they carried a hydraulically powered 2-pounder gun mount forwards for engaging other vessels, a twin powered 20 mm mount on the aft cabin roof, and two twin .303-in machine guns, one on either side of the wheelhouse, for additional firepower in surface actions and defence from aircraft. They were also equipped with side-dropping depth charges and smoke generators at the stern. Some early boats carried a Holman Projector anti-aircraft mortar right aft.
Over one hundred vessels of this class were built. The first ones were given identities MGB 74-97 The second series were numbered MGB 107-onwards. After the initial 34 MGBs, further craft of the 71.5-foot (21.8 m) type (in the sequence up to 176 and from 502 onwards) were of a modified type, known as a 'Type G' to the Canadians, and were intended to be MTBs. However, some of the earlier boats in the 'Type G' series were only ever equipped for but not with 21 in (530 mm) torpedo tubes, and otherwise were armed as the original 2-pdr (40 mm) MGB variant, functioning as gunboats in the mixed 29th Motor Torpedo Boat Flotilla alongside the torpedo-armed MTB versions from 1944.

=== Camper and Nicholson ===
All Camper & Nicholson MGBs were composite-hulled craft.

The entirely gun-armed MGB 502 class was preceded by the experimental MGB 501, which was a unique vessel adapted from a combined MA/SB & MTB design and completed in 1942 as a combined MGB & MTB, with 1 × 2-pdr (40 mm) pom pom, 1 × Oerlikon cannon, 2 × twin 21 in (530 mm) torpedo tubes and 2 × 0.5 in (13 mm) HMGs.

The 502 class were slightly enlarged but otherwise based on the design of 501. They dispensed with the torpedo tubes and shipped an armament of 1 × pom pom in MkXVI mounting, 1 × twin Oerlikon in MkV mounting, 2 × twin HMGs and a 6-pdr (57 mm) Hotchkiss gun Only 502, 503 and 509 were completed as MGBs; 504-508 were completed as the fast blockade runners Master Standfast, Gay Corsair, Gay Viking, Hopewell and Nonsuch.

Dimensions for the Camper and Nicholson motor gunboats (MGB 502 to MGB 509):

- Length: 117 ft (36 m)
- Beam: 20 ft 3 in (6.17 m)
- Draught: 4 ft 1 in (1.24 m)
- Displacement: 95 tons
- Propulsion: 3 × Paxman VRB diesel engines
- Total power output: 3,000 bhp
- Speed:
  - Maximum: 28 knots (52 km/h)
  - Continuous: 25 knots (46 km/h)
- Complement: 21
- Endurance: 2,000 nautical miles (4,000 km) at 11 knots (20 km/h)

MGB 509 was powered by three Packard supercharged petrol engines giving a total output of 4,050 bhp (3,020 kW) and a maximum speed of 31 kn (57 km/h; 36 mph) (27 kn (50 km/h; 31 mph) continuous). Later re-numbered MGB 2009, the central engine was replaced with a Metrovick F.2 gas turbine engine in 1947.

=== Elco ===
Elco built twelve 70 ft (21 m) MGBs for the Royal Navy.

=== Higgins ===
Higgins built 12 70 ft (21 m) MGBs and 15 82 ft (25 m) MGBs.

=== Fairmile designs ===
Fairmile Marine produced designs for small craft for the Royal Navy but most construction was carried out in other yards. The Fairmile C motor gun boats were 110 ft (34 m) long boats.

For flexibility the following Fairmile D design (approx. 200 built) could be fitted out either as MGB or MTB. These equipped the Royal Canadian Navy, Royal Navy, and Royal Norwegian Navy.

== Survivors ==
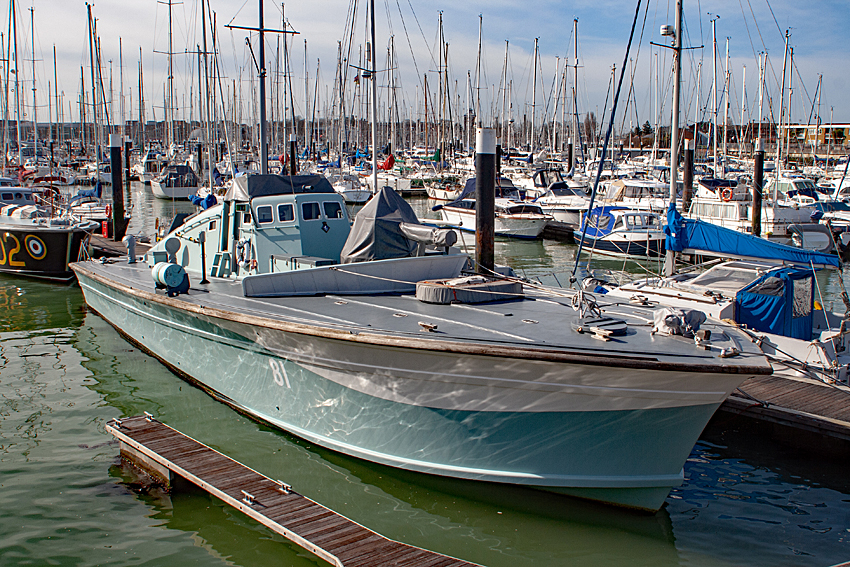
MGB 81 at Gosport

The only fully restored and operational example of a Royal Navy Coastal Forces MGB which saw active service in World War II is MGB 81. She was built by the British Power Boat Company, Hythe, launched in 1942, and served at the Normandy landings (although renumbered as MTB 416 by this time, as the MGB designation had been largely abolished by the RN late in the war). She is now at Portsmouth, owned and maintained by Portsmouth Naval Base Property Trust.

== See also ==
- Motor launch
- Harbour defence motor launch
- Steam gun boat
- Coastal Forces of the Royal Navy
- Type Two 63 ft HSL
- Robert Peverell Hichens, renowned MGB flotilla commander
- Guy Hamilton, film director who served on MGBs during the war.
