= Vosper & Company =

British shipbuilding company

- Company type: Private company
- Industry: Shipbuilding
- Founded: 1871
- Defunct: 1966
- Fate: Merged with John I. Thornycroft & Company
- Successor: VT Group
- Headquarters: Portsmouth, UK

Vosper & Company, often referred to simply as Vospers, was a British shipbuilding company based in Portsmouth, England.

== History ==
The Company was established in 1871 by Herbert Edward Vosper, concentrating on ship repair and refitting work.

By the turn of the century, Vosper was prospering as a general-purpose builder of small craft, boilers and marine engines, for which they had made a name for themselves as a producer of reliable designs. In the lean times after World War I, they concentrated mainly on ship repair to survive. By the early 1930s, the company began to concentrate on high speed naval craft, yachts and power boats, for which they would become renowned. In 1936 they became listed as a public company, known as Vosper, Limited, at which time they moved to a new yard at Portchester. They built Sir Malcolm Campbell's water speed record breaking Bluebird K4, reaching 141.74 mph in 1939.

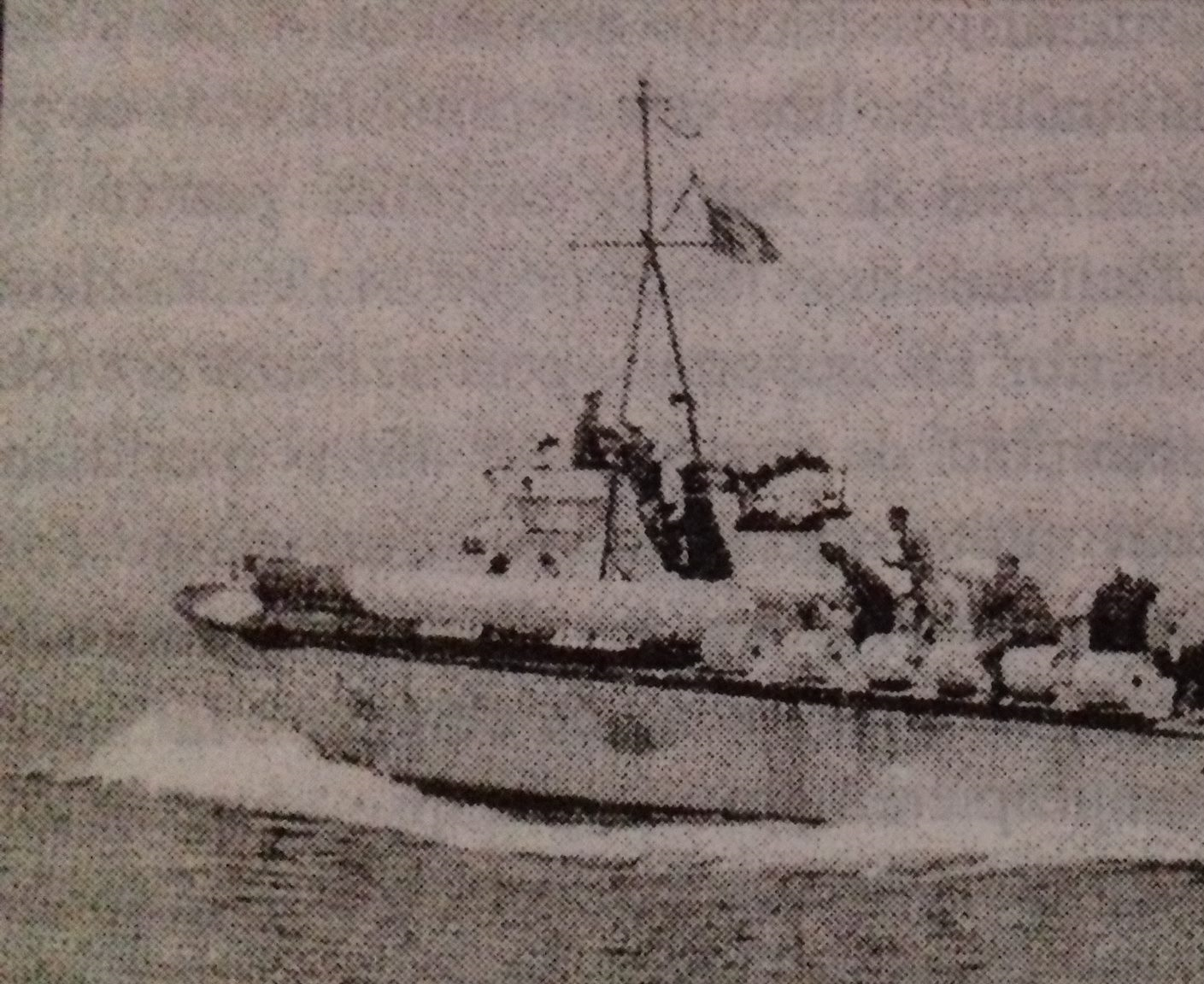
Vosper motor torpedo boat in Romanian service, possibly Viscolul

Vosper would become famous as the builder of small (60 to 70-foot) un-stepped planing hull-form naval Motor Torpedo Boats (MTB) and Motor Gun Boats (MGB) for the Royal Navy in World War II. The original boats had a length of 68 feet and were based upon the prototype MTB 102, which survives to this day as a museum piece. Vosper's designs were widely emulated, and were also elaborated into high speed launches for the Royal Air Force, for rescuing the crews of ditched aircraft. Vosper's wartime experience and accumulation of expertise led to a postwar concentration on high speed fast attack craft, for which they developed a novel "hard chine" V-section hull-form, incorporated in the postwar development MTB 1601, capable of 43 knots. They were selected to experiment with the gas turbine as a form of marine propulsion. The former Steam Gun Boat (SGB) HMS Grey Goose was rebuilt by Vosper with the two Rolls-Royce RM60 engines, followed by the two experimental Bold class fast patrol boats, HMS Bold Pioneer and HMS Bold Pathfinder fitted with Metropolitan-Vickers G2 engines. Unlike the Grey Goose the two Bold-class vessels had an auxiliary diesel engine for economic cruise.

This pioneering hull and turbine propulsion work by Vosper reached its peak with the then revolutionary Brave-class of 1958, powered by the Bristol Siddeley Proteus turboprop engine. The Brave-class used special Vosper-developed "super cavitating" propellers, later developed to allow speeds of up to 58 knots.

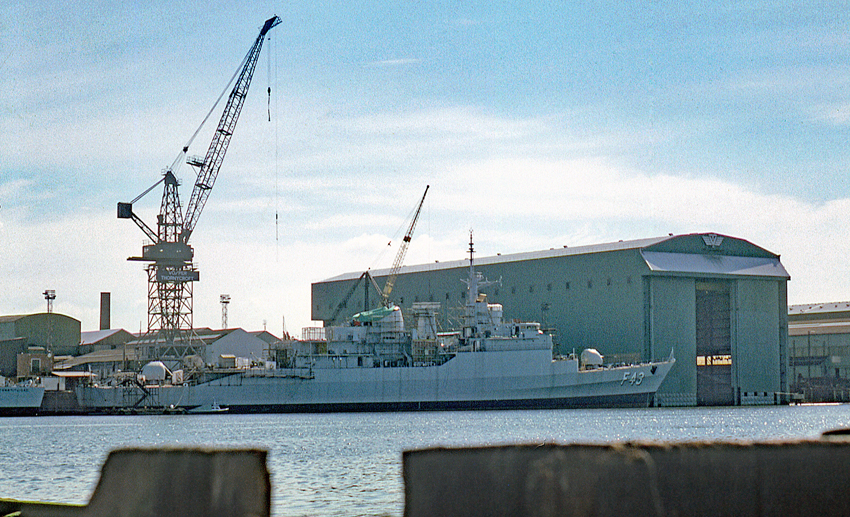
F43 Liberal VT Mk10 ‘Niteroi’ class fitting out at Vosper Thornycroft, Woolston

In the 1960s the company began to move into producing larger vessels, especially for the many emerging navies of post-colonial countries, including the Mark V or Alvand-class frigate, with VSEL, for the Iranian Navy. Vosper alone, however, was unable to produce craft of this size, and in 1966 a merger with John I. Thornycroft & Company provided the shipbuilding capacity and experience to produce the larger vessels being designed by Vosper. The new group was known as Vosper Thornycroft. The former Vosper designs were developed by the new company into the Mark 10 or Niteroi-class frigates for the Brazilian Navy and subsequently elaborated into the handsome and pioneering Type 21 or Amazon-class frigate for the Royal Navy, the first major Royal Navy warship built to a private design since World War II. Vosper Thornycroft continued trading in Woolston, Southampton until 2003 when they relocated shipbuilding operations to Portsmouth operating as VT Group.

The Vosper name is continued by "Vosper International", an independent ship design bureau since 1987.

In July 2008 VT Group and BAE Systems merged their shipbuilding and naval support businesses in a joint venture which traded as BVT Surface Fleet. VT Group exited the shipbuilding industry in 2009 when BAE Systems acquired VT Group's interest in the joint venture. BVT Surface Fleet now trades as BAE Systems Surface Ships.

== See also ==
- British Coastal Forces of World War II
- British Power Boat Company
- Electric Launch Company
- Fairmile Marine
