= Bamboo cannon =

Type of home-made firecracker

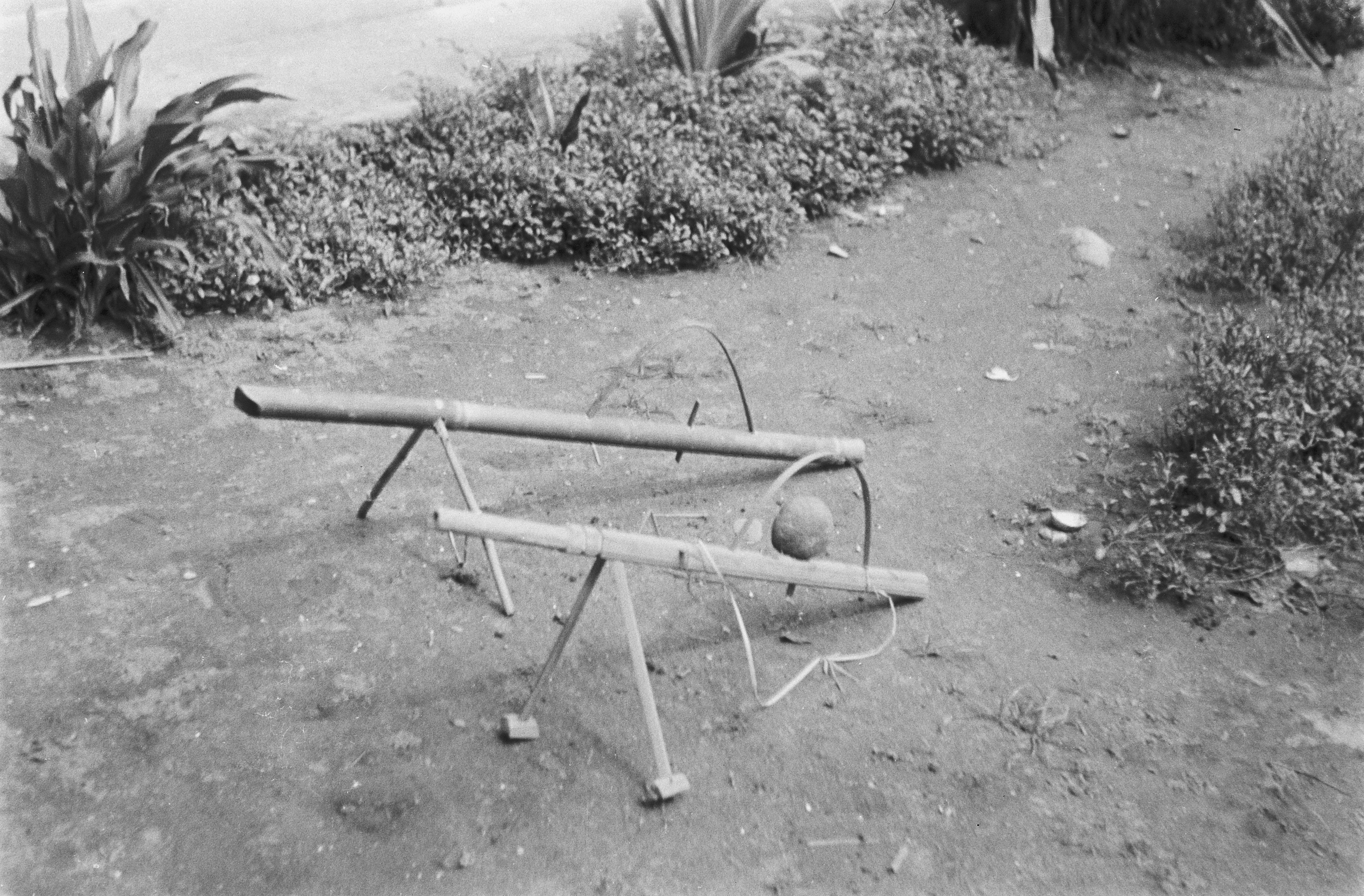
Bamboo cannon in West Sumatra, 1947

A bamboo cannon (Malay: مريام بولوه, romanized: meriam buluh; Tagalog: lantakang kawayan; Waray: lantaka; Indonesian: meriam bambu; Sundanese: lodong; Betawi: bleguran; Javanese: mercon bumbung) is a type of home-made firecracker which is popular during the Eid season in Malaysia and Indonesia, as well as during New Year's Eve celebrations in the Philippines. This is also celebrated in Fiji during New Year’s Eve.

== Operation ==
A typical bamboo cannon consists of a large bamboo node or tube containing some water to which a little calcium carbide is added. The carbide reacts immediately with the water, releasing acetylene gas, which has the widest range of explosive limit of any common chemical and a very low ignition energy. A sharp report is produced when a flame is introduced into the bamboo chamber. However, the low density of the acetylene/air mixture is such that the total combustion energy is quite low and weak containers such as bamboo or even glass rarely shatter. Adding too much carbide does not increase the energy of the explosion but instead weakens it due to a high fuel-to-air ratio. After the shot, fresh air is needed in the tube to have another explosion after more carbide is added.

The operating principle also works with other combustible fuels besides acetylene, but since most others have narrower explosive limits, the effect is not as reliable. Common examples are solvent-containing aerosol consumer products such as spray paint or hairspray.

Less-volatile fuels can also work, with skill, such as 200 ml of hot kerosene, poured into a small hole near the breech of the cannon. A lighting stick is used to ignite the fumes and fire the cannon, then fresh air is blown into the small hole, and the cannon is fired again. The bamboo used for this is usually around 4 to 6 inches (10 to 15 cm) in diameter and 4 to 5 feet (1.2 to 1.5 m) long.

== Indonesia ==
In Indonesia, firing bamboo cannons is traditional children’s pastime. It was very popular in the 1990s, and is still found in rural areas where bamboo is more widely available. In West Kalimantan, the banks of the Kapuas River host Bamboo Cannon Festivals, which are celebrated a week before Idul Fitri. The biggest bamboo cannon in Indonesia broke the records of Indonesian World Record Museum (MURI) in 2007 and again in 2009.

== Malaysia ==
Like other fireworks, bamboo cannons are illegal as stated in the Malaysian Explosive Act 1957. However, Malay children and youth turn to dangerous bamboo cannons as an improvised alternative to commercial firecrackers, which are banned by the government.

== Philippines ==
Bamboo cannons in the Philippines are traditionally known as lantaka (after the native naval cannons of the same name), bumbóng ("bamboo tube"), or kanyóng kawayan ("bamboo cannon"). They generally use either calcium carbide (kalburo) or kerosene. They are commonly used as noisemakers in place of, or in addition to, commercial firecrackers used in New Year celebrations.

Bamboo cannons are legal, and often touted as a safer alternative to firecrackers. Regardless, they are still dangerous: in 2009, a 6-year old boy in Talisay City died due to lung damage after inhaling smoke from a bamboo cannon.

=== Boga ===
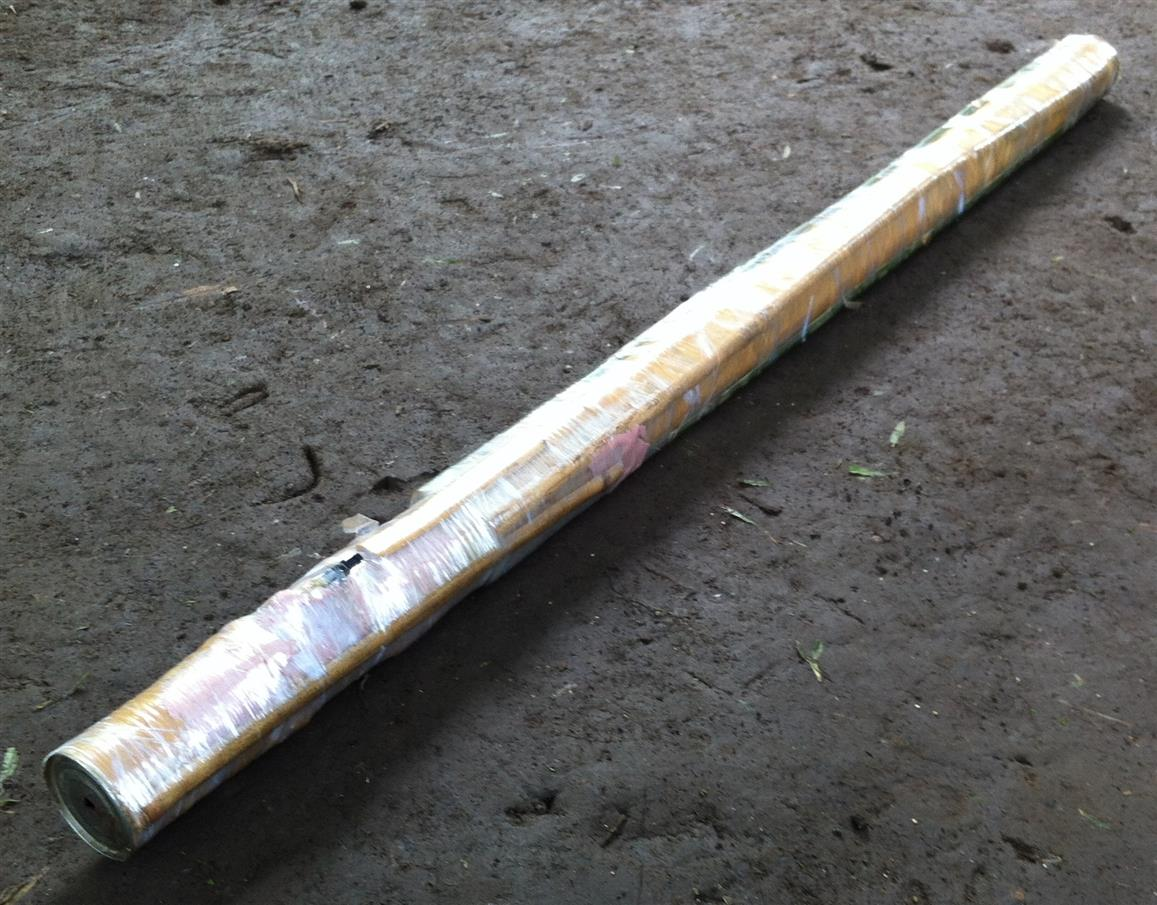
A boga made of tin cans, with igniter attached

The boga or "PVC cannon" is a modern version of the bamboo cannon. A boga is operated in much the same way as a bamboo cannon, but held in the manner of a rocket launcher. Originating in the province of Cavite, use of the device has been banned by the national government since 2006.

The device is made PVC piping of substantial diameter, mated to a toy gun. Denatured alcohol (alternatively, paint thinner or acetone) is squirted or sprayed into the pipe's breech end. The substance is ignited by the toy gun's trigger mechanism connected to a piezo igniter, or by applying fire. The combination of air and flammable fuel in the pipe's enclosed space, when ignited by a spark from the trigger or a flame, causes the mixture to combust.

Prototypes were made in segments from tin cans or cut PET bottles, linked with packaging tape or electrical tape, while later boga were made of PVC pipe. Other modifications were then introduced, such as firing round projectiles which can be used as weapons, and PET bottles as the breech end.

In Kidapawan, Cotabato, the Kanyóng Kawayan Festival is held from 14-20 December to promote safer alternative noisemakers during the Christmas season. Empty powdered milk cans are common projectiles used in the city-wide contest.

A variant form, known as bong-bong, is used Mangaldan, Pangasinan, but fuelled by water and motor oil.

The Department of Health has repeatedly warned against use of boga, which they classify as dangerous as it carries a risk of blast or burn injuries. A ban was ordered on 27 December 2005 against boga for the impending New Year’s Eve celebrations. Officials cited a variety of possible injuries from misuse of the device, mostly involving people inspecting the cannons for delayed explosions, resulting in damage to the facial region from eye injury to post-traumatic conjunctivitis.

Of 178 firecracker-related injuries recorded in 28 December 2006, eighteen percent were confirmed to have been caused by boga. In December 2007, DOH officials maintained its ban on the devices, reminding the public with awareness campaigns.

The Philippine National Police announced in December 2024 that it would suppress continued use of the devices notwithstanding the prevailing ban, and would track down people posting online boga-making tutorials.

== Africa ==
The implement is also present in Africa. In Ghana, bamboo cannons are called pampuro tuo and are used during the Christmas and New Year's holidays. Many African countries, and Africans in the diaspora, including Jamaica and Haiti have similar practices.

== Australia ==
The PVC cannon is a prohibited weapon in the Australian state of New South Wales, along with other devices which are designed to propel or launch a bomb, grenade, rocket or missile by any means other than an explosive.

== See also ==
- Carbide cannon
- Calcium carbide
- Firecracker
- Eid al-Fitr
- Christmas in the Philippines
- id:Festival meriam karbit
- Noisemaker
- Marble gun
- Bubble ring
- Vortex ring gun
- Potato cannon
- Air vortex cannon
