= Big-Bang Cannon =

American toy cannon

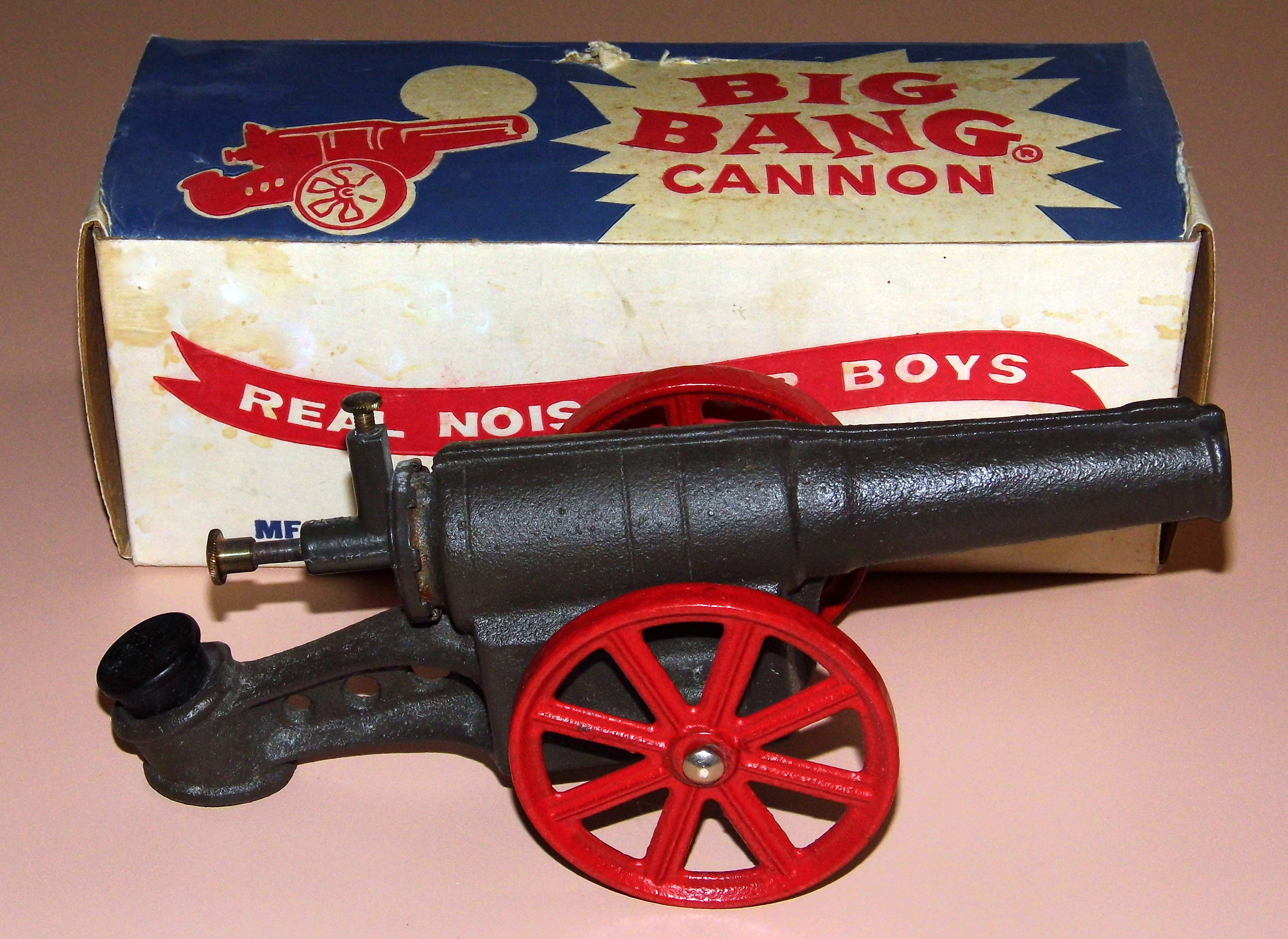
A Big Bang Cannon and its box

The Big-Bang Cannon, also known as the Calcium Cannon, is an American toy cannon first manufactured in the early 20th-century. Numerous consumer fireworks injuries convinced a physics professor at Lehigh University in Bethlehem, Pennsylvania, to patent a "Gas Gun" in 1907, and the manufacturing of Big-Bang Cannons started in 1912, from the Gas Cannon Company.

== History ==
In 1916, the name was changed to the Toy Cannon Works. In 1924, the company changed names again, to The Conestoga Company, Inc. An assistant professor from the same physics department at Lehigh was the company founder and owner until 1955. The Conestoga Company manufactures nineteen models of Big-Bang Cannon in Allentown, Pennsylvania.

A bombing plane, tank, boat and pistol were manufactured during the 1920s, firing on the same principle as the cannons. 1930s designs included a Giant Roller Coaster, Ro-To-Top, Spinning Top, Field Glasses and G-Gun.

Repurposed for toymaking, the historic 4-story wood and brick plant is depicted in T. M. Fowler's 1894 "aerial" drawing of West Bethlehem, with ground floor access both from Connestoga St. on the 1st level, and from 1st Ave. at the 4th level. All machinery on the first three levels were driven by a single electric motor via belts and drive shafts the width of the building. In the mid 1950s, the plant burned, and operations were terminated. Dormant several years, the company was bought from physicist & founder Doc Wiley by brothers Frank H. & Robert E. Miller, who rehired Joseph Gombotz as plant manager and future owner. Taken by eminent domain in the late 1960s to construct the 4-lane spur route I-378, now PA Route 378, the plant moved to E. Goepp St, until its present owners moved it to Sumner Ave. in Allentown.

== Operation ==
Calcium carbide was one of the first products of electric arc furnaces, made economical by Niagara Falls in 1888. After cooling, irregular chunks were packed in air-tight containers for sale and used to generate acetylene gas by slowly dropping water on them. Small carbide lamps were (and still are) used by miners to produce a very bright flame; larger versions were used on early buses and cars.

These toys operate by introducing a little carbide into a chamber containing some water where it reacts immediately to release acetylene gas. A few seconds later (long enough for the gas to spread out in the chamber, but short enough for it not to be lost out the barrel), it is ignited. A means for introducing fresh air for the next explosion is also provided. Acetylene in air has the widest range of explosive limit of any common chemical and also a very low ignition energy, a combination which very reliably produces a loud "bang" explosion compared with other vapour explosions.

The original 1907 "Gas Gun" patent does not claim novelty for the idea of using carbide-produced acetylene to produce explosions in a toy; rather it was the combination of a gas generator, ignition means, and various parts which were cheap to manufacture. That model used battery-operated spark-coil ignition; widely sold mid-century models created a spark as modern lighters do using ferrocerium.

Another key feature of these devices as toys is that acetylene explosions, compared with gunpowder, were much safer. The low density of the acetylene/air mixture is such that the total combustion energy is quite low and there is no recoil and little stress on the chamber holding the explosion, even if the outlet barrel was partly blocked. The original toys were brittle cast iron; the company even demonstrated cannons made of glass to show that there was no likelihood of dangerous fracture. Deliberately adding too much carbide does not increase the energy of the explosion but instead weakens it.

Since a means for producing a consistent gas charge was important, a special granulated form (about 1 mm grains) of calcium carbide was trademarked as Bangsite in 1952. It could be easily metered in a dispensing mechanism, and promotional materials emphasized that Bangsite was difficult to abuse by hammering, lighting with a match and other things young boys might try.

== Patents and trademarks ==
Patent	Patent or Trademark Number	Date
"Gas Gun" U.S. patent 874,952	874,952	December 31, 1907
"Gas Cannon" U.S. patent 1,352,715	1,352,715	September 14, 1920
"Toy Firearm" U.S. patent 1,624,086	1,624,086	April 12, 1927
"Gas Gun" U.S. patent 2,754,607	2,754,607	July 17, 1956
"BIG-BANG" trademark 117,799	117,799	July 31, 1917
"BANGSITE" trademark 559,919	559,919	June 10, 1952
"CONESTOGA COLLECTORS' SERIES" trademark 2,653,490	2,653,490	November 26, 2002

== See also ==
- Bamboo cannon
- Boga (noisemaker)
- Bubble ring
- Vortex ring gun
- Potato cannon
- Air vortex cannon
