= Vortex machine =

Vortex machine may refer to:

- Vortex ring gun, a weapon
- Vortex ring toy
  - Air vortex cannon, a toy
- Vortex tube, a device for separating gases by temperature

== See also ==
- Vortex generator
