= Gas gun =

Gas gun may refer to:

- Air gun, a gun that fires projectiles by means of compressed air or other gases
- Airsoft gun, a replica gun used in airsoft sports
- Astronaut propulsion unit, a device used to move an astronaut relative to the spaceship during a spacewalk
- Dynamite gun, any of a class of artillery pieces that use compressed air to propel an explosive projectile
- Gas pistol, a non-lethal weapon used for self-defense and other purposes
- Gas-operated reloading, a system of operation used to provide energy to operate locked breech, autoloading firearms
- Holman Projector, a naval anti-aircraft weapon
- Light-gas gun, a highly specialized gun designed to generate extremely high velocities
- M61 Vulcan, a hydraulically, electrically, or pneumatically driven, six-barrel, air-cooled, electrically fired Gatling-style rotary cannon
- Potato cannon, a pipe-based cannon that uses air pressure, or combustion of a flammable gas to fire projectiles, usually potatoes
- Propane cannon, a type of bird scarer
- Riot gun, a type of firearm used to fire non-lethal ammunition for the purpose of suppressing riots or apprehending suspects with minimal harm or risk
- Vortex ring gun, a non-lethal weapon that fires gas vortex rings
