= Vortex gun =

Vortex gun may refer to:

- Vortex ring gun, an experimental non-lethal weapon that uses high-energy vortex rings of gas
- Air vortex cannon, a toy that releases doughnut-shaped air vortices

== See also ==
- Vortex cannon (disambiguation)
