= Marble gun =

Improvised firearm that shoots marbles

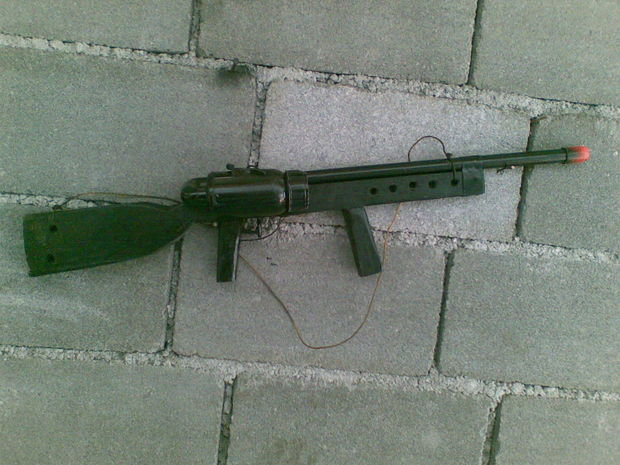
A variant of marble gun

A marble gun is a type of an improvised caseless firearm that shoots marbles, through gas pressure from the ignition of denatured alcohol. They are mainly used to hunt, or target shooting.

== Parts ==
A marble gun has four major components: a barrel, a chamber, an ignition source, and a stock.

Barrels are mostly made with PVC pipes or scrap metal tubing which makes it a smoothbore firearm, sometimes even repurposed rifle barrels. Chambers are usually made from recycled PET or other similar plastic containers, albeit, resistant enough from extreme heat. A common ignition source used is the piezo ignition component found in lighters. Stocks are usually made from planks or carved wood, and there are some instances where an actual rifle stock is used.

As it is an improvised weapon, it is commonly combined together using hot glue, epoxy, electrical tapes, duct tapes or any combination of those adhesives.

== Operation ==
Generally speaking, a marble gun is operated similarly to modern bamboo cannons, where the user sprays denatured alcohol first on the chamber, distribute inside by shaking it, and then inserting one or few marbles in the barrel, and produce a spark by using the piezo ignition component.

== Incidents ==
There are several reported cases of injuries and deaths caused by marble guns:

- A 5 year old boy from Maguindanao del Norte was accidentally killed by his own cousin with a marble gun.
- In Vietnam, a boy accidentally killed his friend while hunting.
- There was an event where a local Filipino jurisdiction banned the guns, noting they had been confiscated but not penalized in other towns in the region.

== See also ==
- Musket
- Potato cannon
- Improvised weapon
- Bamboo cannon
- Liquid propellant
