= Vortex cannon =

Vortex cannon may refer to:

- Vortex cannon, a mythical anti-aircraft weapon
- Air vortex cannon, a toy producing doughnut-shaped air vortices

== See also ==
- Vortex gun (disambiguation)
