= Thomas Shelton (aircraft constructor) =

American aircraft designer and inventor

Thomas Shelton was an American aircraft designer and inventor of the vortex ring gun, which he developed into vortex ring toys.
