= Tobacco rings =

Tobacco ring can refer to:

- A type of onion ring, a type of food.
- For a tobacco smoke ring, see smoke ring.
