= Potato cannon =

Pipe-based cannon

A potato cannon, also known as a potato gun or potato launcher, is a pipe-based cannon that uses air pressure (pneumatic), or combustion of a flammable gas (aerosol, propane, etc.), to fire projectiles, usually potatoes. A simple design consists of a pipe sealed on one end, with a reducer on the other end to lower the diameter of the pipe, which has the corresponding lower-diameter pipe attached to it, called the barrel. Generally, the operator loads the projectile into the barrel, then utilizes a fuel or air pressure (or sometimes both) to propel the projectile out of the cannon.

The potato cannon can trace its origin to the World War II-era Holman Projector, which was a shipboard anti-aircraft weapon.

== Operation methods ==
=== Combustion ===
Combustion powered potato cannons typically have the least complex designs; the four basic elements of which are:

- A fuel-air mixture
- A combustion chamber
- An ignition source
- A barrel

In order to fire, the operator loads a projectile into the barrel, adds fuel to the combustion chamber (for example aerosols or propane), and triggers the ignition source (often using a piezoelectric barbecue igniter). The fuel-air mixture then ignites, creating hot expanding gases which force the projectile out of the barrel. The range of the cannon depends on many variables, including the type of fuel used, the efficiency of the fuel/air ratio, the combustion chamber/barrel ratio, and the flight characteristics of the projectile. Common distances vary from 100–200 meters (330–660 feet), and there is a reported case of a cannon exceeding 500 meters (1,600 feet) of range.

=== Pneumatic ===
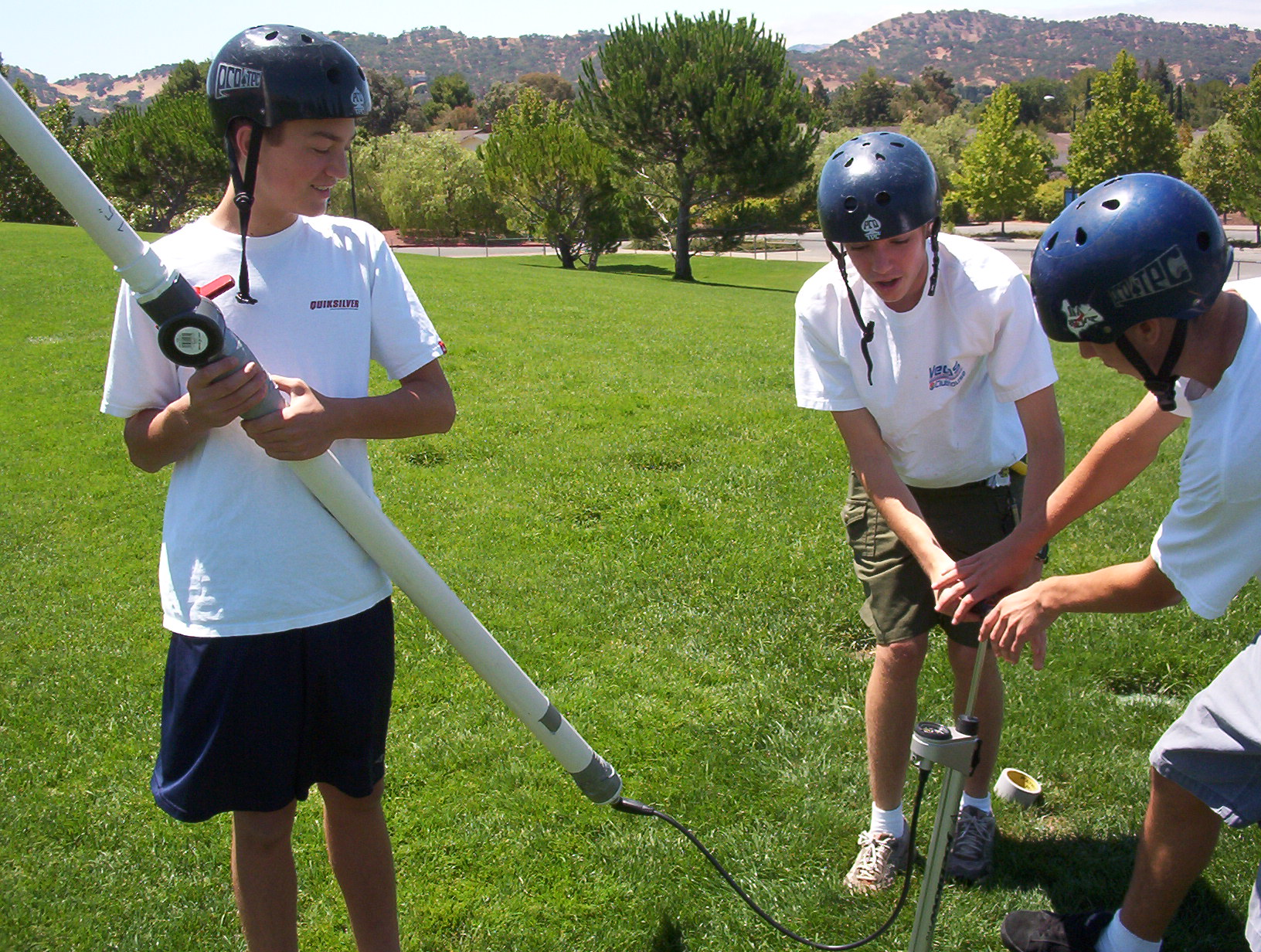
A pneumatic potato cannon

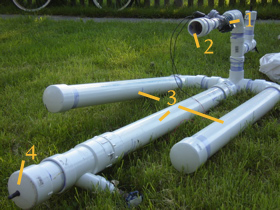
A large pneumatic design: The projectile is loaded in the muzzle (not pictured), which is then attached to the cannon (at 2). The air reservoir (3) is filled to 120 psi (0.83 MPa) using the Schrader valve (4). Upon opening the solenoid valve (1), the air from the reservoir is transferred to the projectile, which is fired out of the muzzle.

The range of pneumatic cannons is more variable than the range of combustion potato cannons due to the increased variation possible in the components. Typical ranges are slightly higher because of the greater power, but the maximum range of some high power pneumatic cannons has been said to be over 1,000 metres (3,300 ft).

=== Hybrid ===
In order to fire, the operator first readies the pressure-triggered valve then injects several times the normal amount of fuel and appropriately more air. When the ignition source is triggered, the pressure from the combustion causes the main valve to open and propels the projectile out of the barrel with the released combustion gases. The hybrid is capable of higher velocities than a combustion or pneumatic potato cannon because the pressure generated is higher than that in a combustion gun (for most fuels), and the shock wave moves faster than it can in a pneumatic (for most gases), due to the higher temperature. Projectiles fired by a hybrid have broken the sound barrier.

=== Dry ice ===
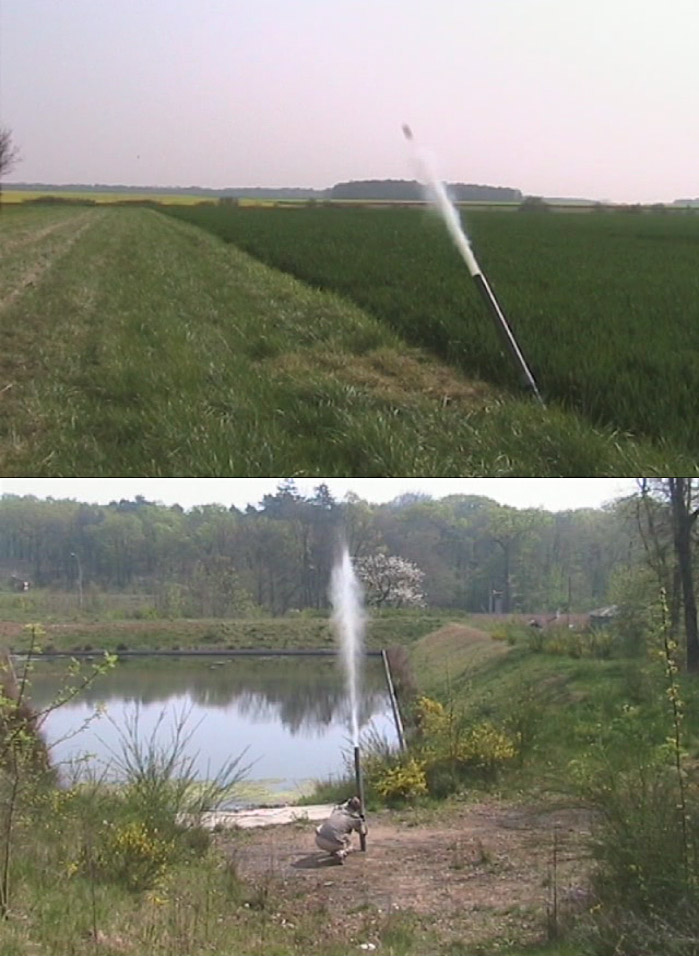
PVC dry ice cannon in use, 1.5kg (3.3 pounds) of concrete is poured at the bottom to reinforce it, and plastic sleeves are used to stiffen the lower (highest pressure) part.

The oldest examples simply involve dropping pieces of dry ice into a tube closed at one end and sealing the other end by jamming the projectile in. When the pressure of the carbon dioxide from the subliming dry ice builds high enough, the projectile will be blown out of the tube.

== Primary materials ==
=== Plastics ===
- PVC-U (Polyvinyl chloride, unplasticized): Highly popular due to its availability and relatively low cost. PVC pipes are available in a wide variety of sizes and pressure ratings. In industry, however, they are illegal for compressed air applications—if they are damaged under pressure the plastic can fail explosively.
- ABS (Acrylonitrile butadiene styrene): Another popular plastic piping material, more expensive and less common than PVC but available in the same sizes and pressure ratings. Unlike PVC it is used in compressed air systems as it splits rather than shatters on failure.

=== Metals ===
- Brass: Often brass fittings are used on potato cannons for small parts of the construction like fuel systems, because it is one of the most common materials for small pipe fittings. Occasionally large parts of potato cannons are machined entirely out of brass.

== Valve types ==
=== Pneumatic ===
- The Quick Dump Valve is a recent addition to the choices of valves for spudding. A QDV is a spool valve that is balanced under pressure with one end of the spool oriented toward the barrel. The spool is manually unbalanced allowing pressure between the end of the spool and the projectile in the barrel. The air pressure then forces the spool back and the projectile forward. Since the valve is triggered with no pilot pressure, the valve snaps open with no pilot pressure to hinder it. Currently it is not commercially for sale and must be hand built by the hobbyist like most piston valves.

Alternate designs have also been used which use a sharp projectile to puncture the burst disk, like a mortar or using a manual puncturing device to trigger failure of the disk.

Burst disk cannons have also been made which are fired electrically, using a nichrome wire to trigger failure by heating.

== Connections ==
=== Welding, soldering and gluing ===
- Solvent welding: used for similar plastic connections using solvent fittings, the solvent temporarily dissolves the polymer chains of the plastic and the parts to be joined are brought together. On rehardening, the polymer chains from each part are entangled and so form a solid weld.

== The sound barrier ==
It is rare for a potato cannon to be powerful enough to break the sound barrier, although there are some cases of this happening using specialized designs. The potato cannons used are typically hybrids; but some pneumatic cannons have achieved the feat, either by using a special low-density gas, such as helium, or high pressures combined with a fast valve. There is also one reported case of a combustion design achieving super-sonic velocities.

The highest projectile speed recorded from a potato cannon is 933.3 m/s (3,060 ft/s) (approximately 2.7 times the speed of sound) with a 16.6-gram (256 gr) 20 mm plastic slug from a hybrid using a 20 MPa (2,900 psi) pre-ignition mixture of air and propane.

Supersonic velocities have been obtained using the related vacuum bazooka with a de Laval nozzle. This also relies on significantly lowering the density of the gas.

== Practical uses ==
Although potato cannons are created and used for the purpose of recreation there are other devices which work on identical principles in many other fields with more serious uses.

=== Entertainment ===
- Promotional sports cannons: Portable pneumatic cannons which run on bottled CO_{2} are common at large sports games in the U.S. where they are used to project items such as T-shirts or wrapped food into the audience. Such cannons can be dangerous: the Phillie Phanatic injured a fan with a hot dog cannon in June 2018.

=== Industry ===
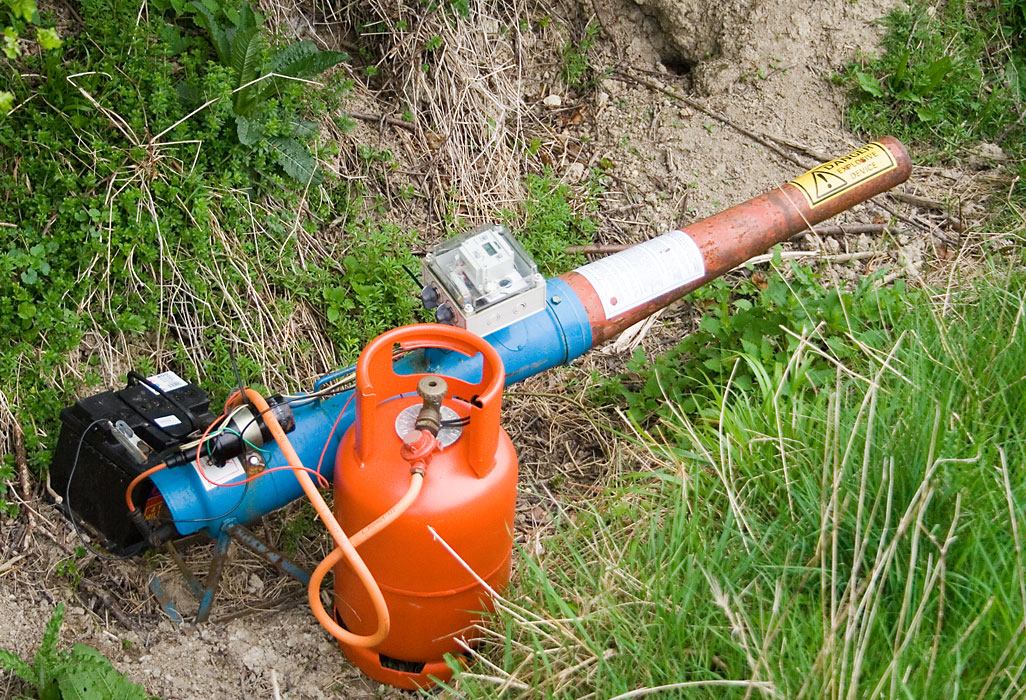
A typical propane gun bird scarer

- Shock tubes: used to test hypersonic and supersonic combustion ramjets.

== Safety ==
Potato cannons by nature are hazardous and can present safety issues if poorly constructed or used. Projectiles or failing guns can be dangerous and result in life-threatening injuries, including cranial fractures, enucleation, and blindness if a person is hit.

== Legality ==
=== Australia ===
In Queensland, manufacturing or possessing a potato cannon is a criminal offence, and they cannot be legally registered or licensed.

== See also ==
- Air gun – Device that uses compressed air to fire projectiles
- FN 303
- Paintball marker – Air gun used in the shooting sport of paintball
- Plastic pipework – Tubular section or hollow cylinder made of plastic
- Pneumatic weapon – Projectile weapon using pressurized air
- Punkin chunkin – Sport of hurling a pumpkin mechanically
- Bamboo cannon
- Boga (noisemaker)
- Bubble ring
- Vortex ring gun
- Air vortex cannon
- Big-Bang Cannon
