= Smoke ring =

Visible vortex ring formed by smoke in a clear atmosphere

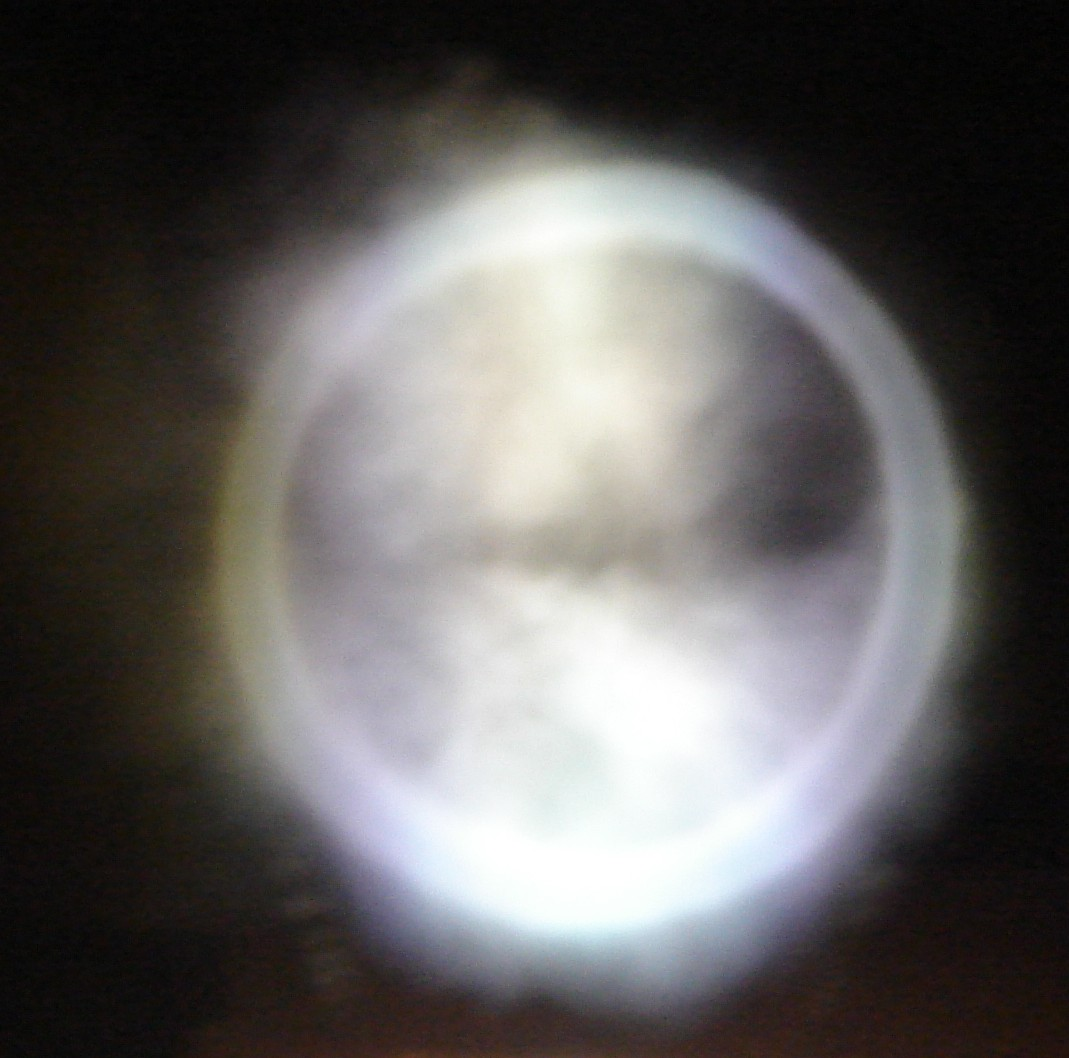
Smoke ring from a smoke chamber

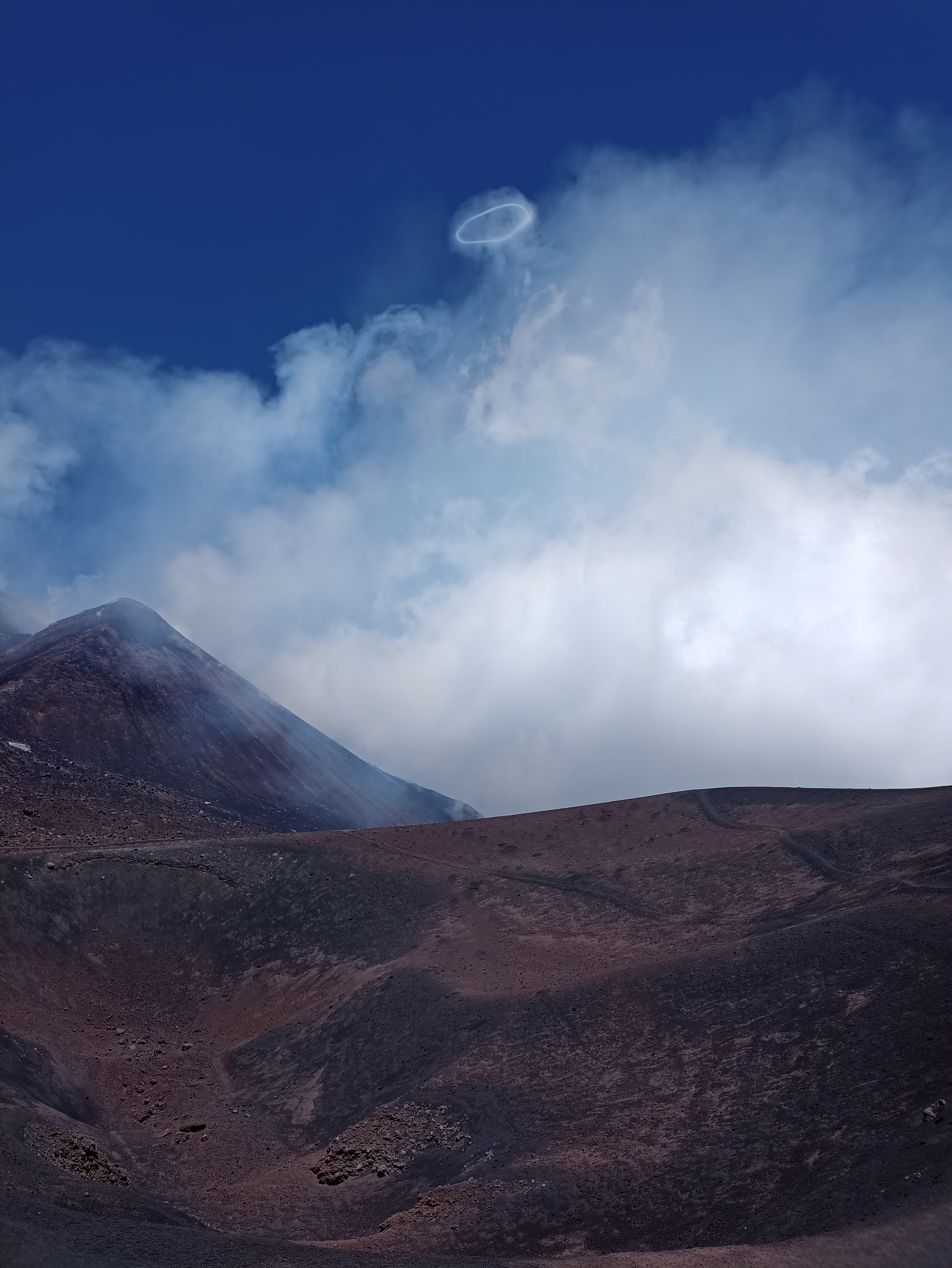
Vortex ring from Mount Etna

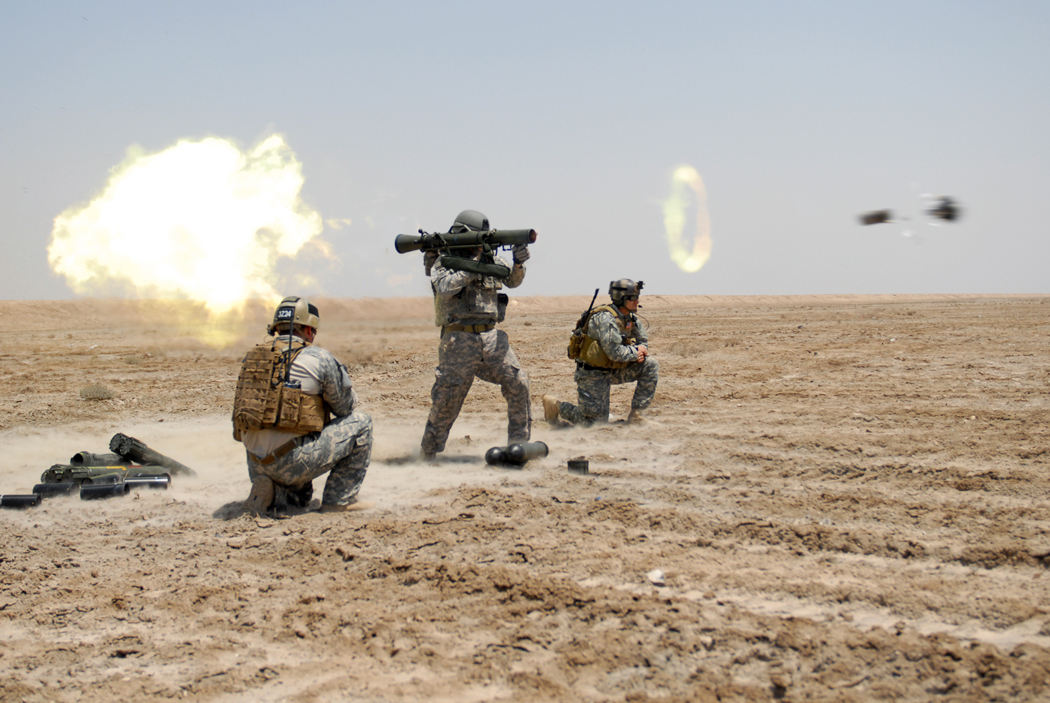
Smoke rings are also emitted by various types of weapons.

A smoke ring is a visible vortex ring formed by smoke in a clear atmosphere.

Smokers may blow smoke rings from the mouth, intentionally or accidentally. Smoke rings may also be formed by sudden bursts of fire (such as lighting and immediately putting out a cigarette lighter), by shaking a smoke source (such as an incense stick) up and down, by firing certain types of artillery, or by the use of special devices, such as vortex ring guns and vortex ring toys. The head of a mushroom cloud is a large smoke ring.

A smoke ring is commonly formed when a puff of smoke is suddenly injected into clear air, especially through a narrow opening. The outer parts of the puff are slowed by the still air (or by edges of the opening) relative to the central part, imparting it the characteristic poloidal flow pattern.

The smoke makes the ring visible, but does not significantly affect the flow. The same phenomenon occurs with any fluid, producing vortex rings which are invisible but otherwise entirely similar to smoke rings.

Rare visible vortex rings produced by volcanoes have been incorrectly called "smoke rings", despite being formed by the condensation of erupting steam, rather than by combustion.

== Smoking and breathing ==
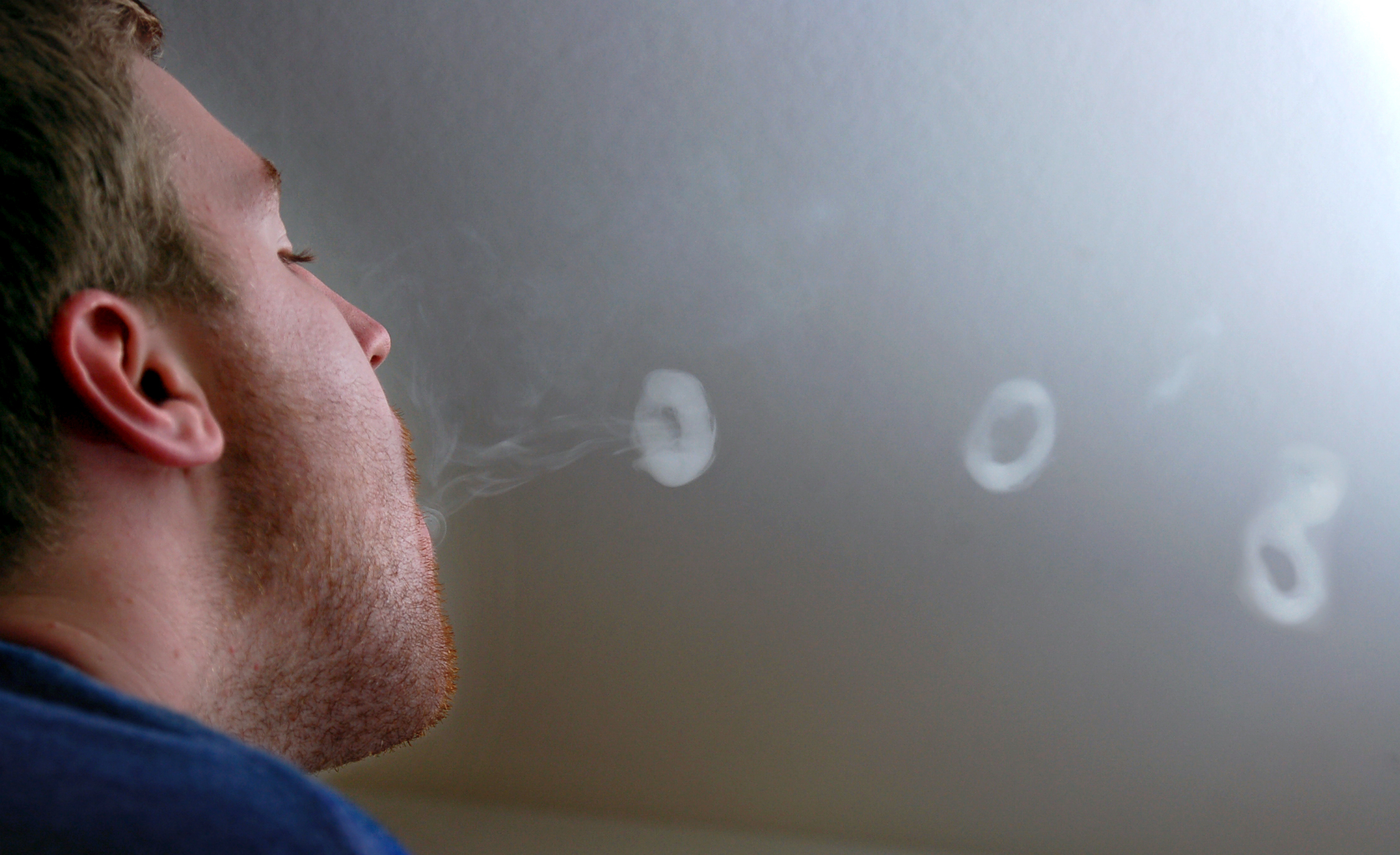
Man blowing smoke rings

A smoker may produce rings by taking smoke into their mouth and expelling it with a tongue flick, by closing the jaw, tapping the cheek, or producing a sudden burst of air with the lungs and throat. The smoker may also use any of those methods to blow into a cloud of smoke outside their mouth.

A trick often performed in conjunction with mouth-blown smoke rings is the French inhale.

It is also possible to produce a vapour ring by using the same techniques on a cold day by exhaling.

The most famous such steam rings were those produced during the mid-20th century by Douglas Leigh's billboard on the Hotel Claridge in New York City's Times Square, advertising Camel cigarettes. An automated steam chamber behind the billboard produced puffs of steam every four seconds, giving the appearance of smoke rings leaving the smoker's open mouth and drifting away. Inspired by a World War II-era prohibition on lighted advertising, the Camel smoker remained a Times Square landmark long afterwards.

Some users of electronic cigarettes modify their devices to inhale large amounts of vapour at once, to exhale "clouds" in patterns like smoke rings.

== See also ==
- Bubble ring
