= Vacuum bazooka =

Pipe-based cannon

A vacuum bazooka is a pipe-based cannon which uses a vacuum pump (often a vacuum cleaner) to reduce pressure in front of the projectile and therefore propel a projectile as a result of the air pressure acting on its reverse. The concept was originally proposed by Neil A Downie in 2001 but many variations have been built since.

== Construction ==
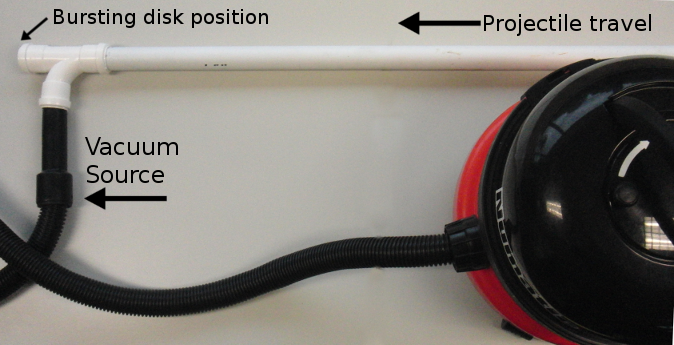
Vacuum cannon photo diagram

The vacuum bazooka uses a straight tube which is sealed with a type of bursting disk composed of 2 - 4 layers of aluminum foil at the muzzle and by the projectile at the breech. A tee-piece near the muzzle allows application of vacuum. When the projectile is released the air pressure behind the projectile causes it to accelerate towards the vacuum port. When the projectile reaches the vacuum port its momentum causes it to continue past and break through the bursting disk towards the target. A lightweight bursting disk such as a piece of paper can be secured simply by the vacuum action when it is held against the barrel.

The maximum velocity the projectile reaches is about 650 mph (1,050 km/h).

The velocity of a projectile in a vacuum cannon can be modeled. The maximum velocity is independent of the projectile mass and barrel diameter. In this model, the maximum velocity is lower than the speed of sound (about 343 m/s (1,130 ft/s; 770 mph; 1,230 km/h)).

== Variations ==
Several variations have been developed including a belt fed repeating model.

== See also ==
- Spud gun
- Plastic pressure pipe systems
