= Piezo ignition =

Method of igniting camping stoves

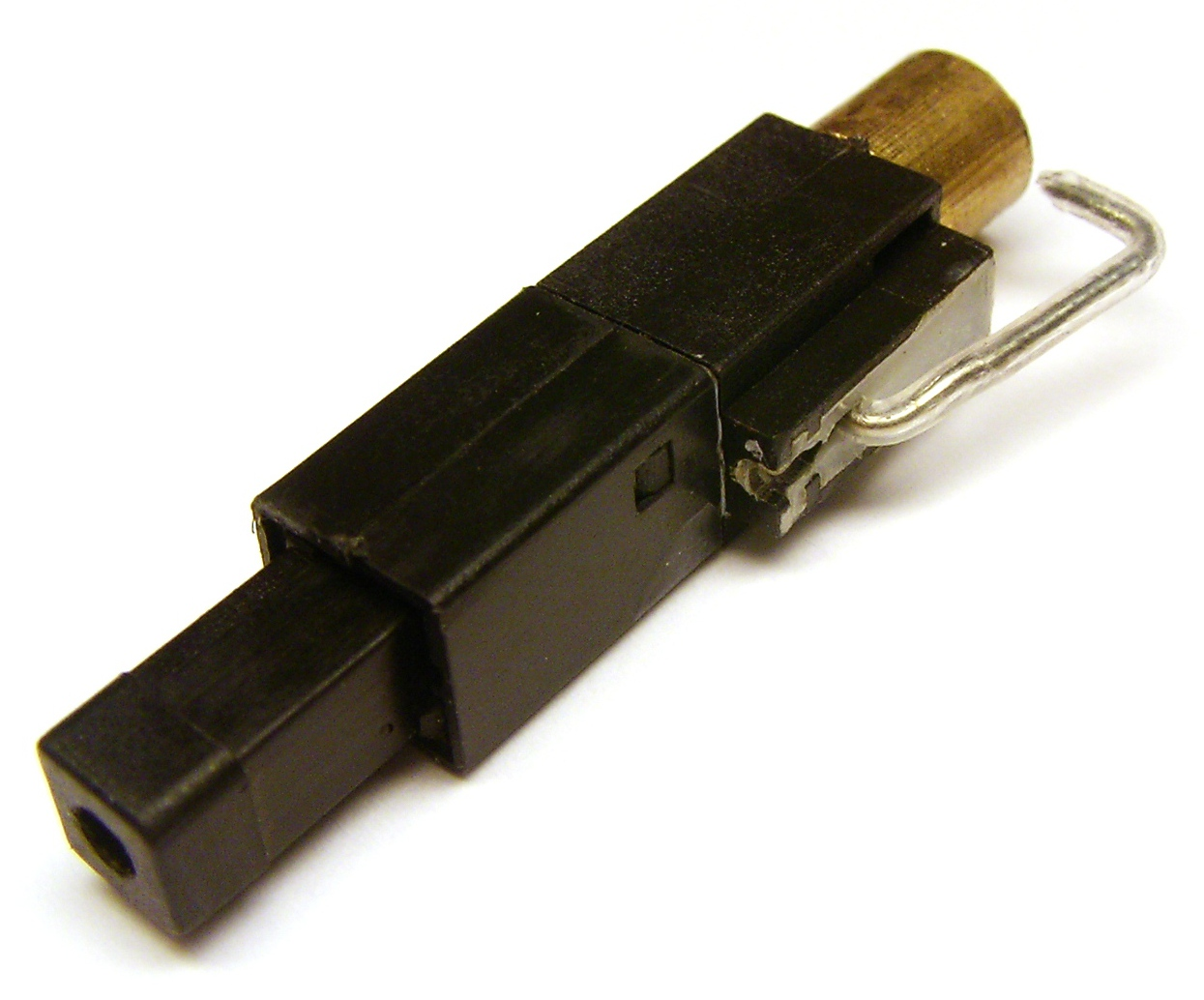
A piezo igniter element from a typical lighter

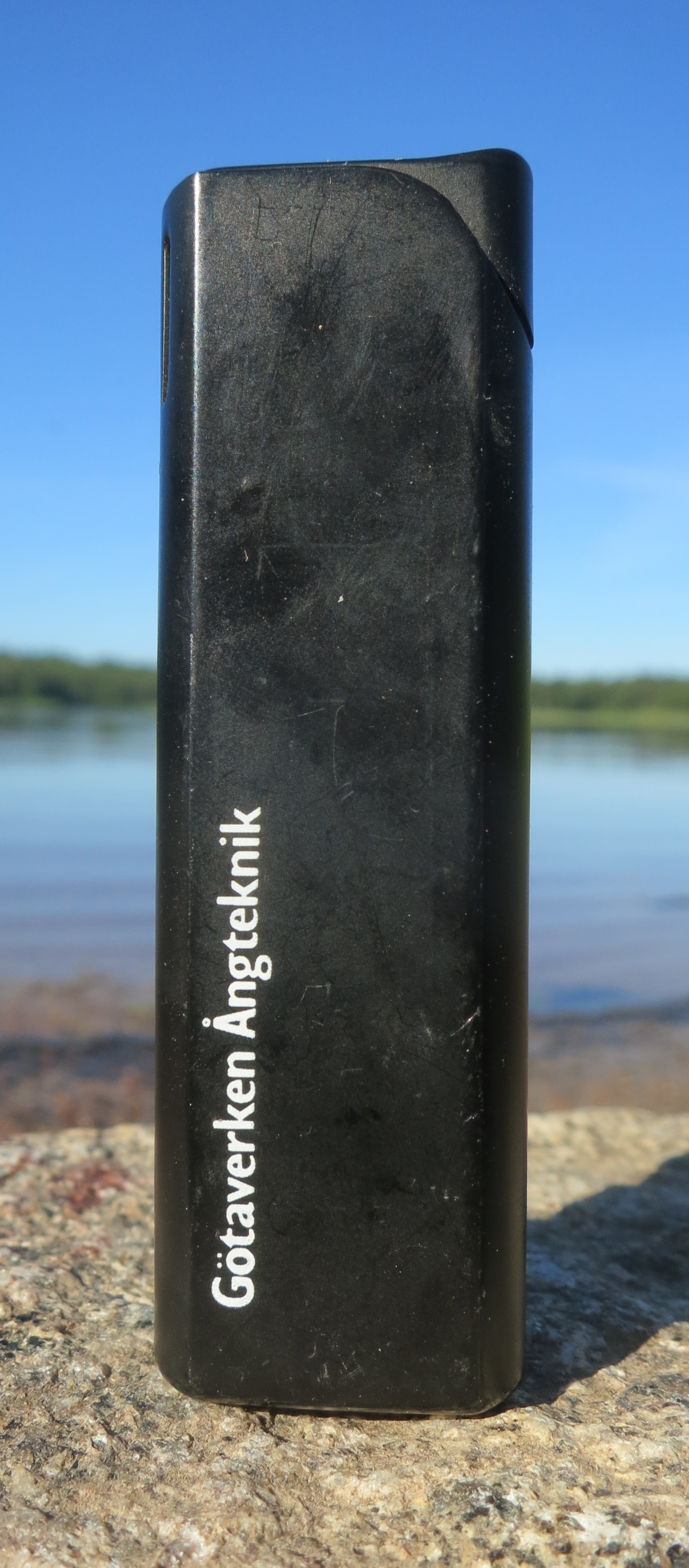
A 1980s pocket lighter with piezo ignition

Piezo ignition is a type of ignition that is used in portable camping stoves, gas grills and some lighters. Piezo ignition uses the principle of piezoelectricity, which is the electric charge that accumulates in some materials in response to mechanical deformation. It consists of a small, spring-loaded hammer which, when a button is pressed, hits a crystal of PZT. This sudden forceful deformation produces a high voltage and subsequent electrical discharge, which ignites the gas.

No external electric connection is required, though wires are sometimes used to place the sparking location away from the crystal itself. Piezo ignition systems can be operated by either a lever, push-button or built into the control knob. An electric spark is usually generated once per turn of the knob or press of the button. Eventually, the crystal will no longer be able to emit an electric discharge. However, this takes a long time — piezoelectric igniters usually stop sparking after several tens of thousands of strikes.

The most common material used in piezo ignition systems is lead zirconate titanate (PZT). However, other materials such as quartz and certain types of ceramics can also exhibit piezoelectric properties. These materials generate an electric charge in response to mechanical stress.

The piezoelectric effect was discovered by Pierre and Jacques Curie in 1880. The application of this effect in ignition systems began to be explored in the mid-20th century, leading to the development of modern piezo ignition devices.
