= Minimum ignition energy =

The minimum ignition energy (MIE) is a safety characteristic in explosion protection and prevention which determines the ignition capability of fuel-air mixtures, where the fuel may be combustible vapor, gas or dust. It is defined as the minimum electrical energy stored in a capacitor, which, when discharged, is sufficient to ignite the most ignitable mixture of fuel and air under specified test conditions. The MIE is one of the assessment criteria for the effectiveness of ignition, e.g. the discharge of electrostatic energy, mechanical ignition sources or electromagnetic radiation. It is an important parameter for the design of the protective measure of "avoidance of effective ignition sources".
