= Vortex ring gun =

Experimental non-lethal weapon used for crowd control

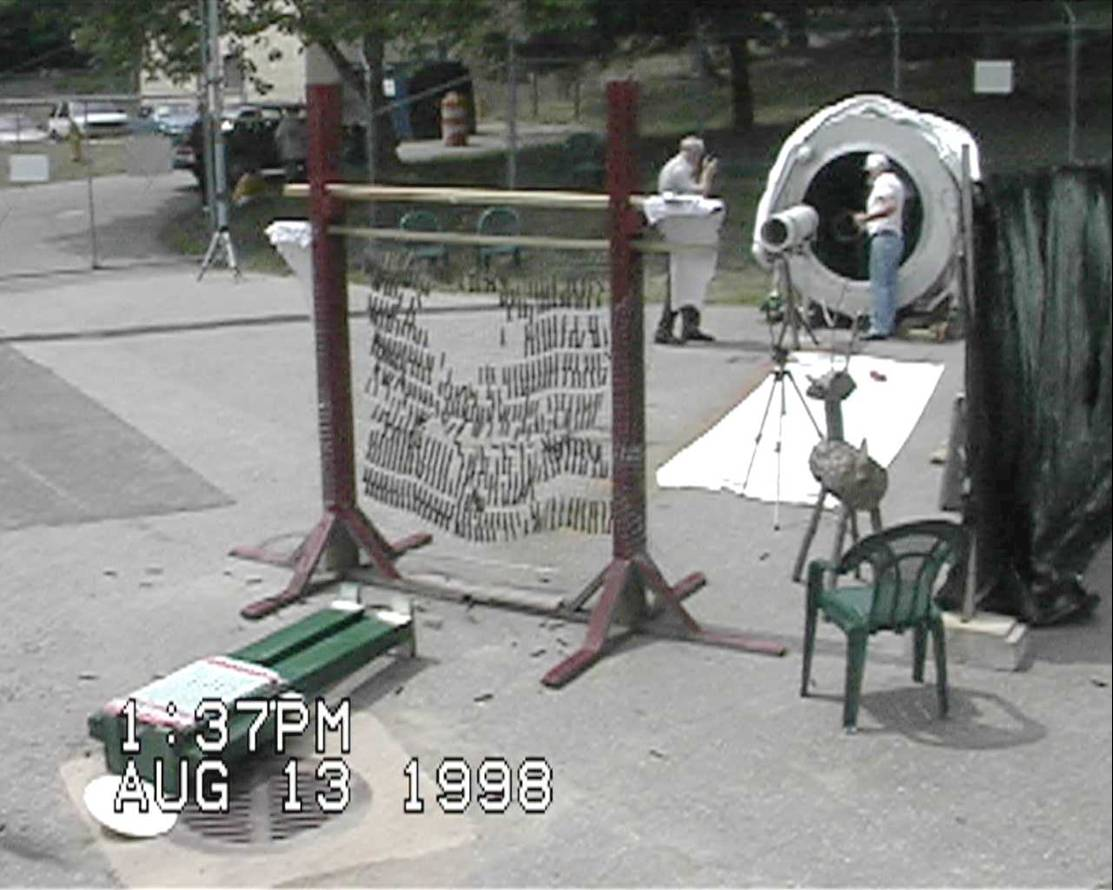
Knock-down test of a 109 mph (175 km/h; 49 m/s) vortex ring gun.

The vortex ring gun is an experimental non-lethal weapon for crowd control that uses high-energy vortex rings of gas to knock down people or spray them with marking ink or other chemicals.

The concept was explored by the US Army starting in 1998, and by some commercial firms. Knockdown of distant individuals currently seems unlikely even if the rings are launched at theoretical maximum speed. As for the delivery of chemicals, leakage during flight is still a problem.

Weapons based on similar principles but different designs and purposes have been described before, typically using acetylene-air or hydrogen–oxygen explosions to create and propel the vortices.

== Operation ==
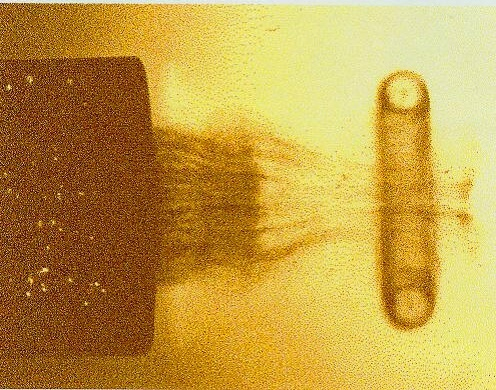
Spark photography image of a vortex ring in flight.

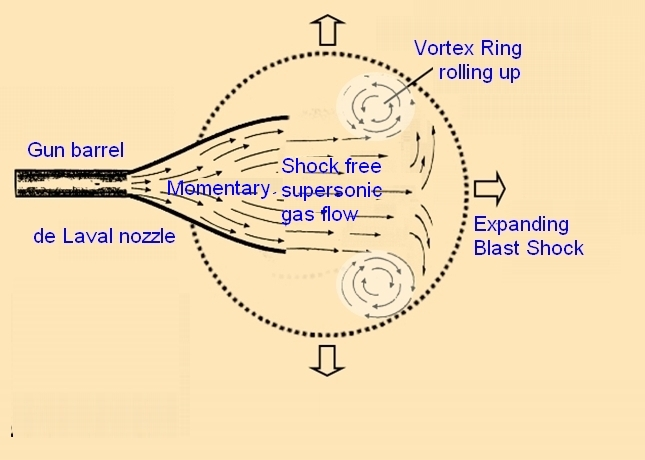
The vortex ring gun concept for maximum possible velocity and spin.

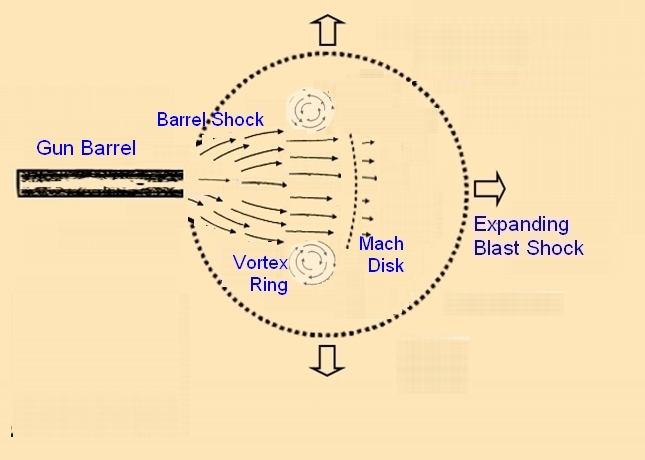
A degraded vortex ring fired without a nozzle.

In a typical concept, a blank cartridge is fired into a gun barrel that has a diverging nozzle screwed onto the muzzle. In the nozzle, the short pulse of high pressure gas briefly accelerates to a supersonic exit velocity, whereupon a portion of the exhaust transforms from axial flow into a subsonic, high spin vortex ring with the potential energy to fly hundreds of feet.

The nozzle of a vortex ring gun is designed to both contain the short pulse of accelerating gas until the maximum pressure is lowered to atmospheric and to straighten the exhaust into an axial flow. The objective is to form the vortex ring with the highest possible velocity and spin by colliding a short pulse of a supersonic jet stream against the relatively stagnant air behind the spherically expanding shock wave. Without the nozzle, the high pressure jet stream is reduced to atmospheric by standing shock waves at the muzzle, and the resulting vortex ring is not only formed by a lower velocity jet stream but also degraded by turbulence.

== History ==
=== Invention ===
The concept was developed by American aircraft builder Thomas Shelton during World War II as a means to deliver chemical weapons. Shelton later developed a large version to deliver a mechanical shock. These were never employed for military purposes, and after the war Shelton developed them into vortex ring toys, specifically the Flash Gordon Air Ray Gun.

=== The 1998 U.S. Army project ===
The United States Army Research Laboratory was asked by the Marine Corps Joint Non-Lethal Weapons Directorate to determine whether vortex rings could be used for non-lethal crowd control. Overall management authority for the study was assigned to the United States Army Materiel Command, with support by ARDEC. Contributors to the study included individuals from the US Army's Aberdeen Proving Grounds, Adaptive Research Incorporated, Berkeley Research Associates, EWS Limited, Johns Hopkins University, Pennsylvania State University, Sara Corporation, and Sonic Development Laboratory.

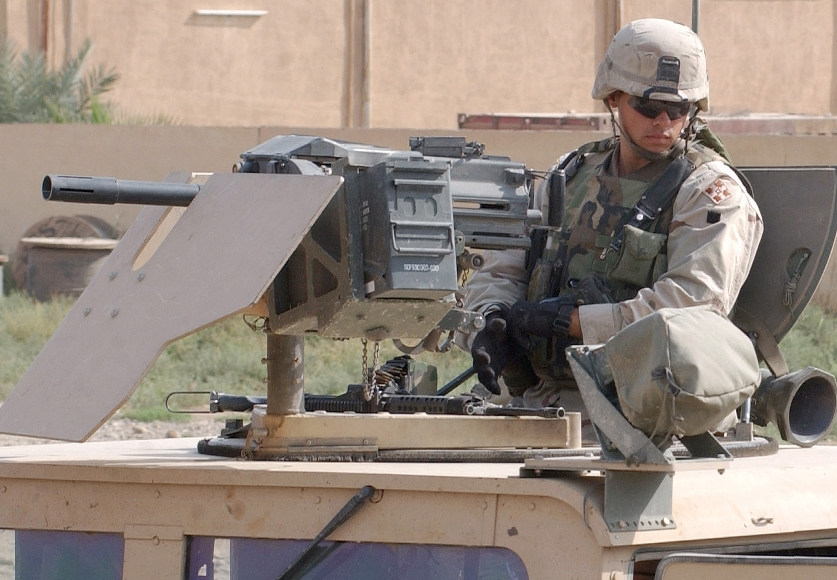
MK19-3 40 mm grenade launch machine gun.

The end product was to be a kit for quickly converting an existing lethal weapon to a non-lethal vortex ring generator that could knock down an individual or spray him with a dye, malodorous chemical, or incapacitating chemical. The kit, consisting of a nozzle with chemical reservoirs and belts of blank 40 mm cartridges modified to detonate at pressures up to 100,000 psi (690 KN/sqN), was being designed for the Navy MK19-3. The 40 mm grenade machine gun was selected because firing at 4–10 shots per second resonates with many body parts and causes a stronger impact effect.

Single-shot field tests performed without optimized nozzles led to the conclusion vortex rings were unsuitable for non-lethal crowd control. This conclusion was reached partly because knockdown did not appear to be feasible at the desired range of 100 feet (30 m), partly because of the excessive spillage onto bystanders under the flight path if used to transport chemicals or dyes, and partly because the flight noise and speed enabled it to be easily avoided at the downrange target. The foremost reliability issue with this project was turbulence caused by the high-energy propellant burning outside the barrel.

== See also ==
- Bamboo cannon
- Boga (noisemaker)
- Bubble ring
- Potato cannon
- Air vortex cannon
- Big-Bang Cannon
