= Air vortex cannon =

Toy that fires air vortices at a target

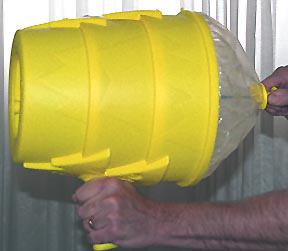
The Brian Jordan plastic "airzooka"

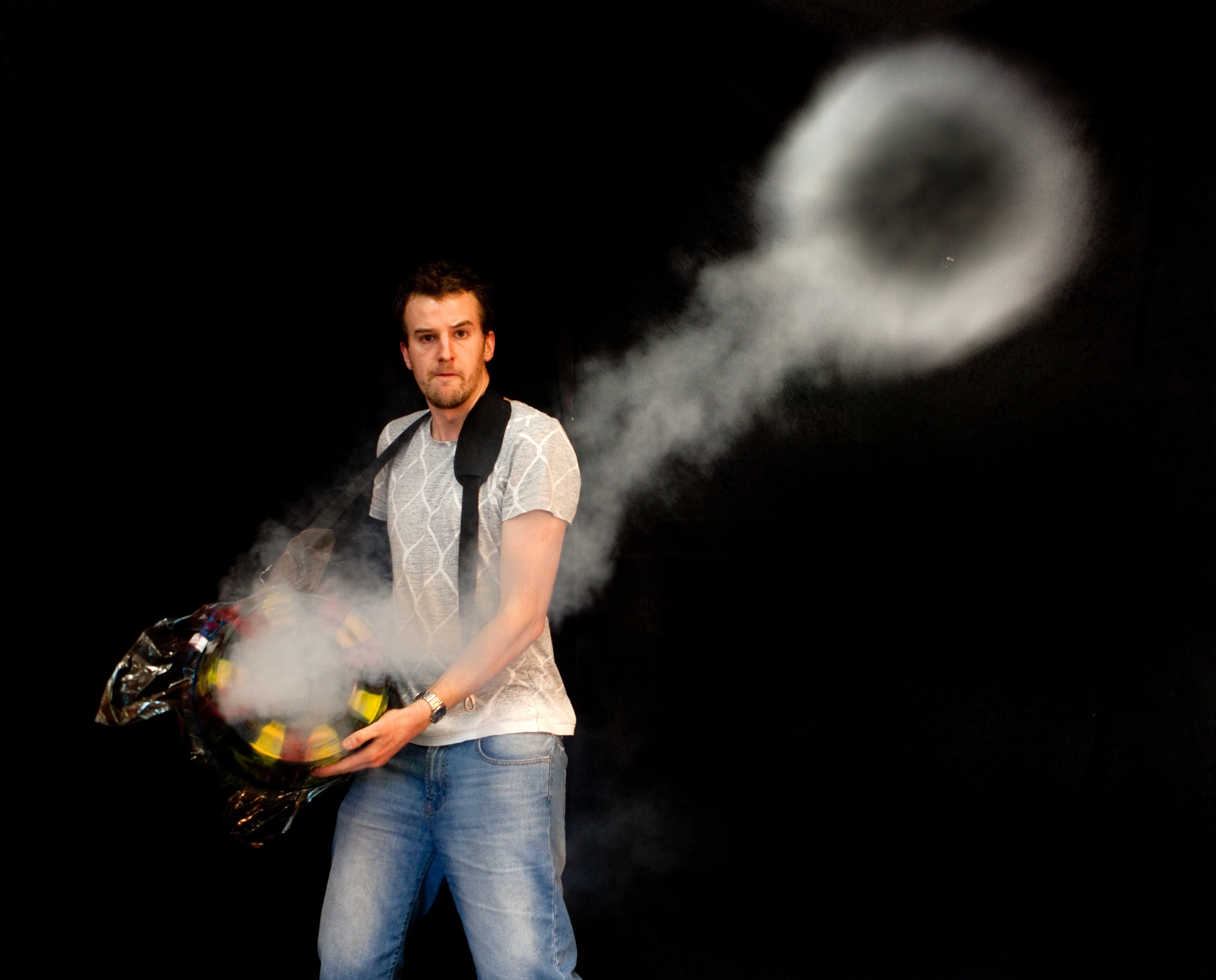
Smoke ring produced by a home-made vortex ring toy

An air vortex cannon is a toy that releases doughnut-shaped air vortices — similar to smoke rings but larger, stronger and invisible. The vortices can ruffle hair, disturb papers or blow out candles after travelling several metres.

An air vortex cannon can be made easily at home, from just a cardboard box.

Air cannons are used in some amusement parks such as Universal Studios to spook or surprise visitors.

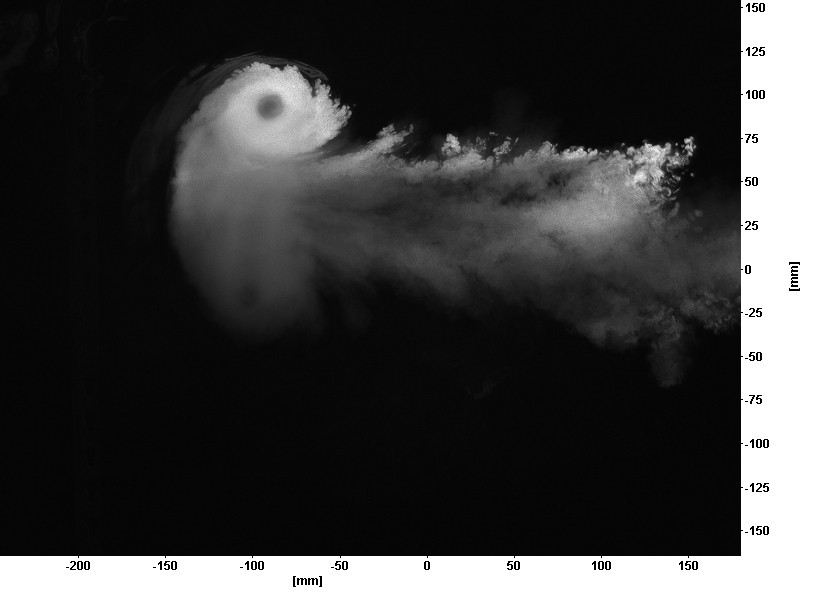
Visualization of the air vortex fired from an air vortex cannon

The Wham-O Air Blaster toy introduced in 1965 could blow out a candle at 25 feet (7.6 m). The commercial Airzooka was developed by Brian S. Jordan who claims to have conceived it when still a boy. A feature of the Airzooka is a loose non-elastic polythene membrane, tensioned by a bungee cord, rather than elastic membranes. This allows a much greater volume of air to be displaced.

A large air vortex cannon, with a 9 feet (2.7 m) wide barrel and a displacement volume of 2,873 US gallons (10.88 m^{3}) was built in March 2008 at the University of Minnesota, and could blow out candles at 180 feet (55 m).

In 2012, a large air vortex cannon was built for Czech Television program Zázraky přírody (lit. 'Wonders of Nature'). It was capable of bringing down a wall of cardboard boxes from 100 metres (330 ft) in what was claimed to be a world record.

== See also ==
- Bubble ring
- Vortex ring gun
- Bamboo cannon
- Boga (noisemaker)
- Potato cannon
- Big-Bang Cannon
