= Bubble ring =

Toroidal vortex ring of air in water

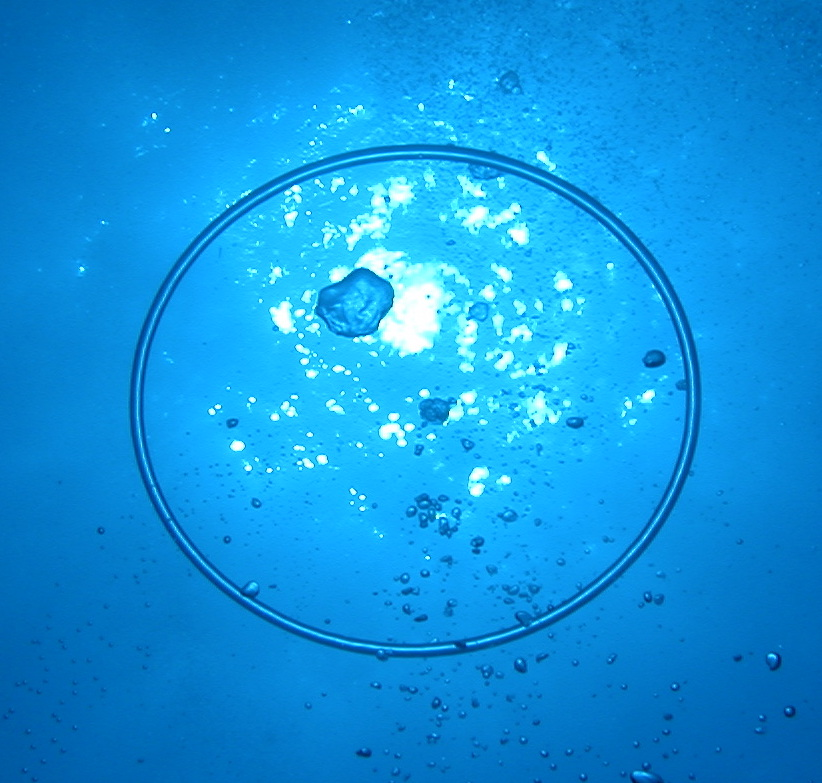
Bubble ring

A bubble ring, or toroidal bubble, is an underwater vortex ring where an air bubble occupies the core of the vortex, forming a ring shape. The ring of air as well as the nearby water spins poloidally as it travels through the water, much like a flexible bracelet might spin when it is rolled on to a person's arm. The faster the bubble ring spins, the more stable it becomes. The physics of vortex rings are still under active study in fluid dynamics. Devices have been invented which generate bubble vortex rings.

== Physics ==
External videos
- Bubble ring time warp - in slow motion YouTube

As the bubble ring rises, a lift force pointing downward that is generated by the vorticity acts on the bubble in order to counteract the buoyancy force. This reduces the bubble's velocity and increases its diameter. The ring becomes thinner, despite the total volume inside the bubble increasing as the external water pressure decreases. Bubble rings fragment into rings of spherical bubbles when the ring becomes thinner than a few millimetres. This is due to Plateau–Rayleigh instability. When the bubble reaches a certain thickness, surface tension effects distort the bubble's surface pulling it apart into separate bubbles. Circulation of the fluid around the bubble helps to stabilize the bubble for a longer duration, counteracting the effects of Plateau–Rayleigh instability. Below is the equation for Plateau–Rayleigh instability with circulation as a stabilizing term:

$$\omega^2= \left ( \frac{-ka \, K_1(ka)}{K_0(ka)} \right ) \left [ (1-k^2 a^2) \frac{T}{pa^3} - \frac{\Gamma^2}{4\pi^2 a^4} \right ]$$

where $\omega$ is the growth rate, $k$ is the wave number, $a$ is the radius of the bubble cylinder, $T$ is the surface tension, $\Gamma$ is the circulation, and $K_n(x)$ is the modified Bessel function of the second kind of order $n$. When $\omega$ is positive, the bubble is stable due to circulation and when $\omega$ is negative, surface tension effects destabilize it and break it up. Circulation also has an effect on the velocity and radial expansion of the bubble. Circulation increases the velocity while reducing the rate of radial expansion. Radial expansion however is what diffuses energy by stretching the vortex. Instability happens more quickly in turbulent water, but in calm water, divers can achieve an external diameter of a meter or more before the bubble fragments.

=== Buoyancy induced toroidal bubbles ===
As an air bubble rises, there is a difference in pressure between the top and bottom of the bubble. The higher pressure at the bottom of the bubble pushes the bubble's bottom surface up faster than the top surface rises. This creates a fluid jet that moves up through the center of the bubble. If the fluid jet has enough energy, it will puncture the top of the bubble and create a bubble ring. Because of the motion of the fluid moving through the center of the bubble, the bubble begins to rotate. This rotation moves the fluid around the bubble creating a toroidal vortex. If the surface tension of the fluid interface or the viscosity of the liquid is too high, then the liquid jet will be more broad and will not penetrate the top of the bubble. This results in a spherical cap bubble. Air bubbles with a diameter greater than about two centimeters become toroidal in shape due to the pressure differences.

=== Cavitation bubbles ===
Cavitation bubbles, when near a solid surface, can also become a torus. The area away from the surface has an increased static pressure causing a high pressure jet to develop. This jet is directed towards the solid surface and breaks through the bubble to form a torus shaped bubble for a short period of time. This generates multiple shock waves that can damage the surface.

A bubble ring forms a vortex ring, shaped like a doughnut which spins poloidally in the direction of the arrows.

The bubble ring travels in the same direction its innermost side rotates.
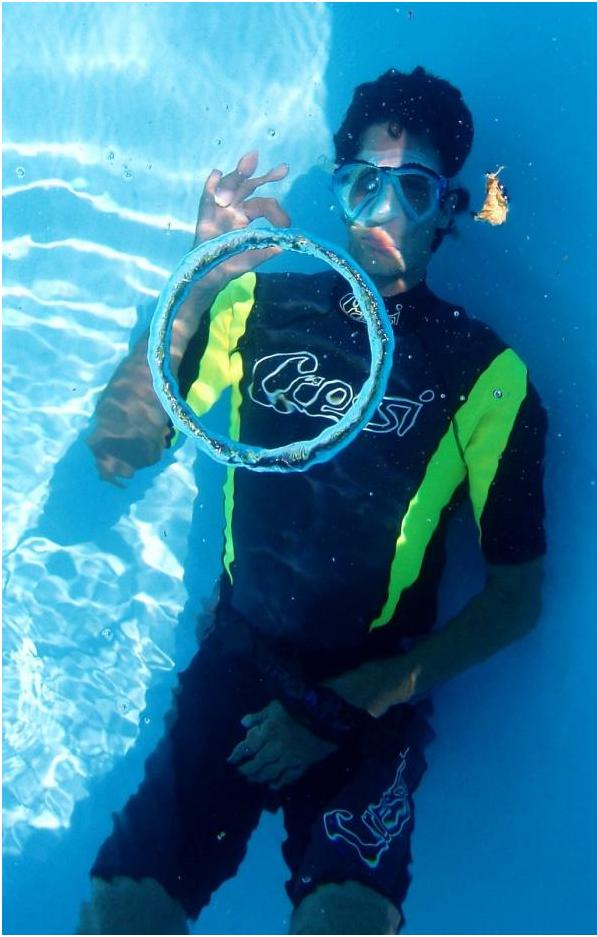
An underwater diver blows a bubble ring.

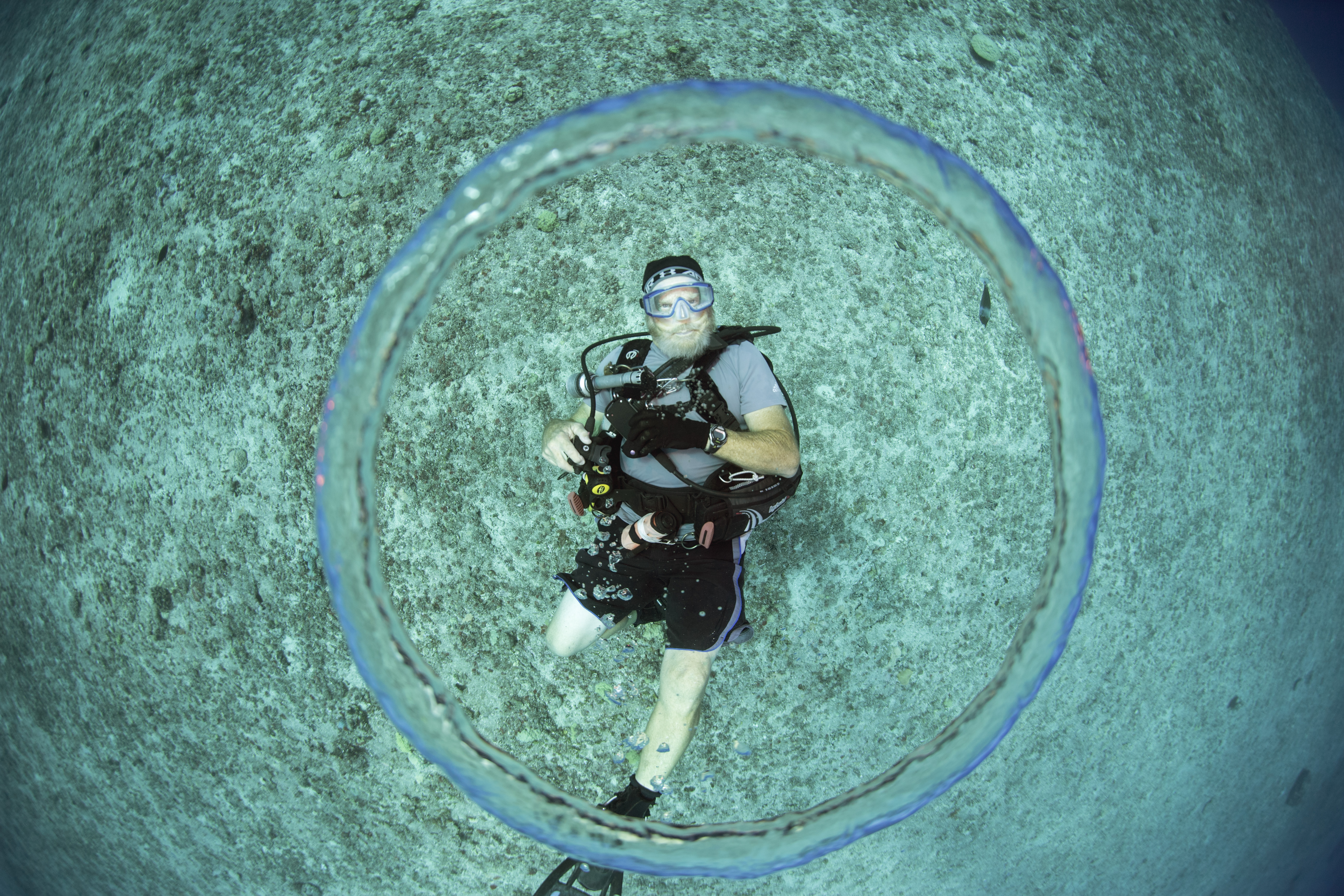
A scuba diver blows a bubble ring.

== Cetaceans ==
Cetaceans, such as beluga whales, dolphins and humpback whales, blow bubble rings. Dolphins sometimes engage in complex play behaviours, creating bubble rings on purpose, seemingly for amusement. There are two main methods of bubble ring production: rapid puffing of a burst of air into the water and allowing it to rise to the surface, forming a ring; or creating a toroidal vortex with their flukes and injecting a bubble into the helical vortex currents thus formed. The dolphin will often then examine its creation visually and with sonar. They will sometimes play with the bubbles, distorting the bubble rings, breaking smaller bubble rings off of the original or splitting the original ring into two separate rings using their beak. They also appear to enjoy biting the vortex-rings they have created, so that they burst into many separate normal bubbles and then rise quickly to the surface. Dolphins also have the ability to form bubble rings with their flukes by using the reservoir of air at the surface.

External videos
- Dolphins react to bubble rings BBC Earth

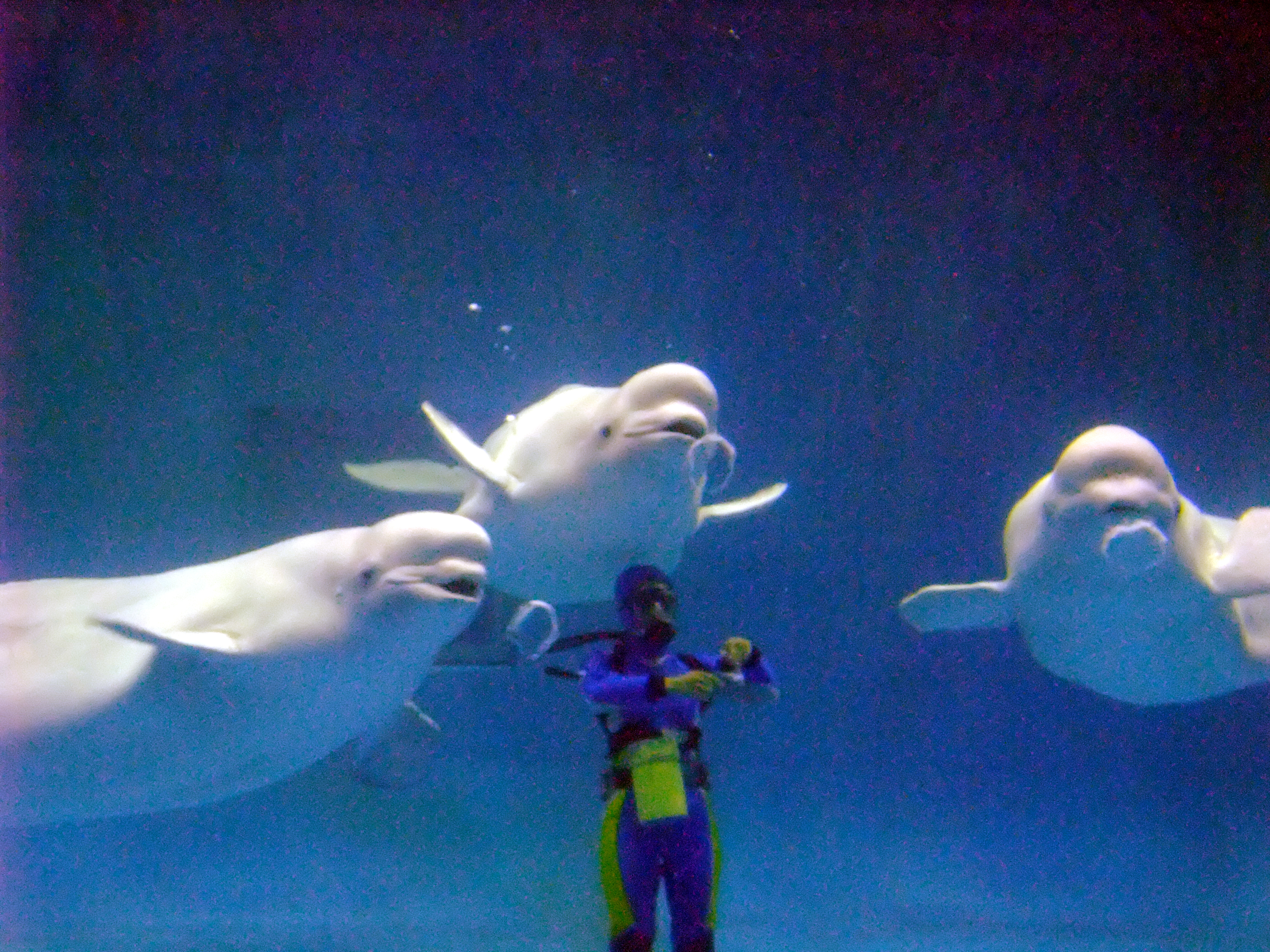
Beluga whales blowing bubble rings in Shimane Aquarium

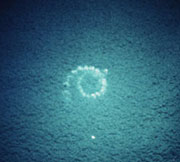
Aerial view of a humpback bubble net

Humpback whales use another type of bubble ring when they forage for fish. They surround a school of forage fish with a circular bubble net and herd them into a bait ball.

== Human divers ==
Some swimmers, scuba divers and freedivers can create bubble rings by blowing air out of their mouth in a particular manner. Long bubble rings also can form spontaneously in turbulent water such as heavy surf.

== Other uses of the term ==
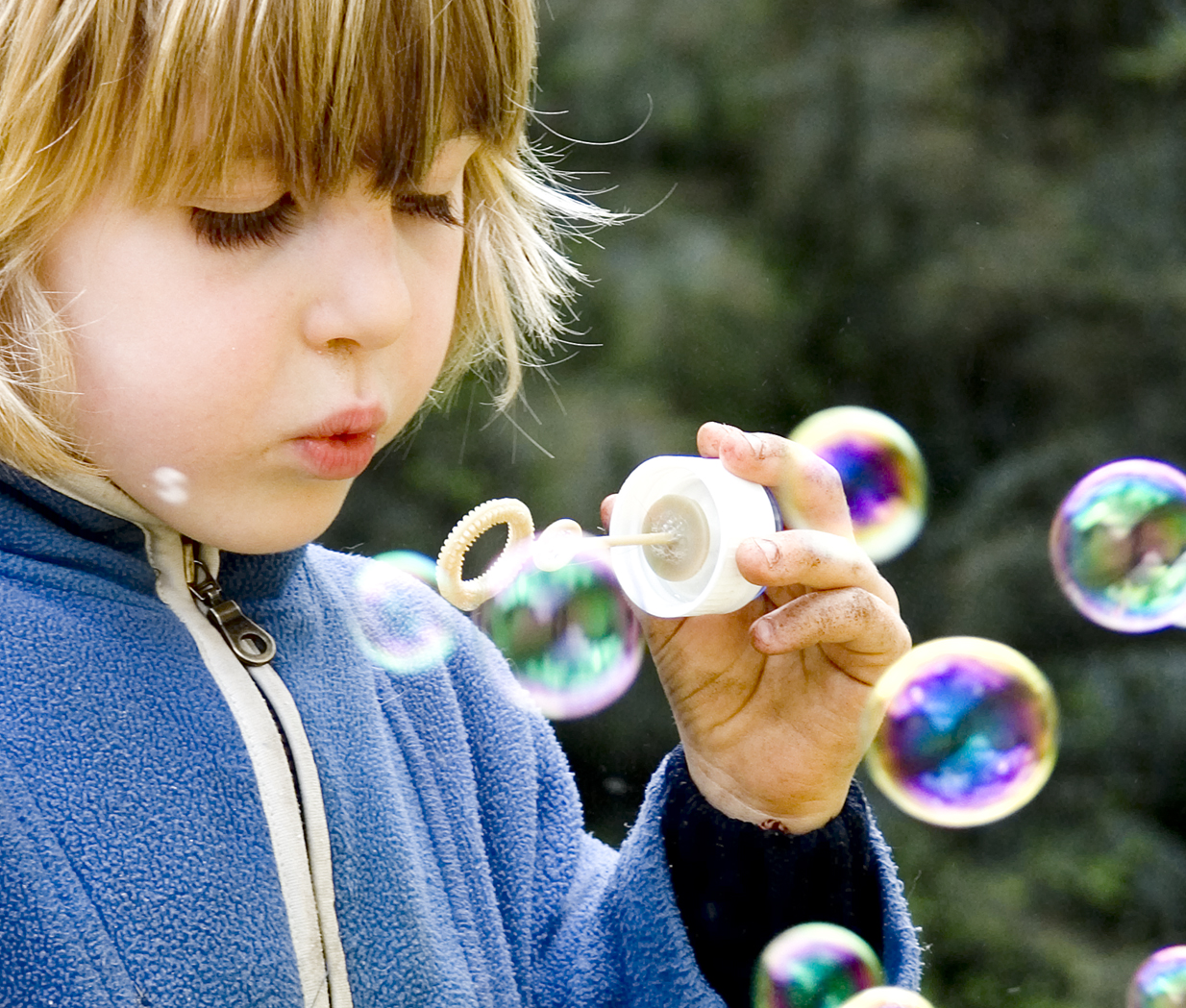
Boy blowing soap bubbles from a bubble ring

The term "bubble ring" is also used in other contexts. A common children's toy for blowing soap bubbles is called a bubble ring, and replaces the bubble pipe toy that was traditionally used for many years because the bubble pipe can be perceived as too reminiscent of smoking and therefore a bad example for children. Soapsuds are suspended on a ring connected by a stem to the screwcap of a bottle containing soapsuds.

== See also ==
- Carousel feeding
- Smoke ring
- Vortex ring toy

== Further references ==
- Das, D. and Kumar, V. (2005) "Experimental investigation of the trajectory of compressible vortex rings", 11th AIAA/CEAS Aeroacoustics Conference, page 2953. doi:10.2514/6.2005-2953.
- Hameroff SR, Kaszniak AW and Scott A (1998) Toward a science of consciousness II: the second Tucson discussions and debates Page 558. MIT Press. ISBN 978-0-262-08262-4.
- Lundgren, TS; Mansour, NN (1991). "Vortex ring bubbles". Journal of Fluid Mechanics. 224: 177–196. Bibcode:1991JFM...224..177L. doi:10.1017/s0022112091001702. S2CID 120629247.
- Marten, K; Shariff, K; Psarakos, S; White, DJ (1996). "Ring bubbles of dolphins. A number of bottlenose dolphins in Hawaii can create shimmering, stable rings and helices of air as part of play". Scientific American. 275 (2): 82–87. Bibcode:1996SciAm.275b..82M. doi:10.1038/scientificamerican0896-82. PMID 8693325.
- McCowan, B; Marino, L; Vance, E; Walke, L; Reiss, D (2000). "Bubble Ring Play of Bottlenose Dolphins (Tursiops truncatus): Implications for Cognition" (PDF). Journal of Comparative Psychology. 114 (1): 98–106. doi:10.1037/0735-7036.114.1.98. PMID 10739315. Archived from the original (PDF) on 2010-06-10.
