= HMC ML Q054 =

Canadian wooden upgunned submarine chaser

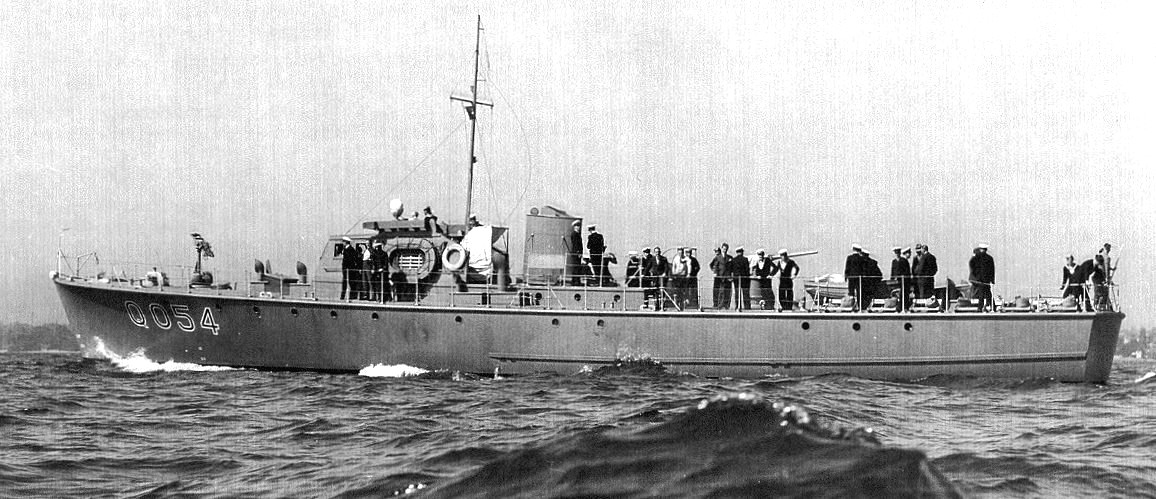
- HMC ML Q054

History

Canada
- Operator: Royal Canadian Navy; 71st M.L. Flotilla
- Builder: Greavette Boats Ltd.; Gravenhurst, ON
- Laid down: 24 March 1941
- Launched: 30 August 1941
- Acquired: 17 October 1941
- Out of service: 6 December 1944
- Home port: Gaspé
- Identification: CML 005; HMC ML Q054

General characteristics
- Class & type: Fairmile B motor launch
- Type: Upgunned sub chaser; Acoustic minesweeper; Rescue boat
- Displacement: 79 long tons
- Length: 112 ft (34 m)
- Beam: 17 ft 0 in (5.18 m)
- Draught: 4 ft 10 in (1.47 m)
- Propulsion: Two 650 bhp (480 kW) Hall-Scott Defender petrol engines
- Speed: 20 knots (37 km/h; 23 mph)
- Range: 1,500 mi (1,300 nmi; 2,400 km) at 12 knots (22 km/h; 14 mph)
- Complement: 2 officers and 14 non-commissioned
- Crew: 16
- Time to activate: 48 hours to reconfigure weapons
- Sensors & processing systems: ASDIC
- Armament: Upgunned sub chaser; 1 x twin 20 mm Oerlikon; 1 x single 20 mm Oerlikon; 2 x twin 0.303 in machine guns; 1 x 3 lb HA/LA gun; 12 depth charges; 1 x Holman Projector; 1 x Y-gun (4 reloads); Acoustic minesweeper; 1 x twin 20 mm Oerlikon; 1 x single 20 mm Oerlikon; 2 x twin 0.303 in machine guns; 1 x 3 lb HA/LA gun; 14 depth charges; Rescue boat; 1 x single 20 mm Oerlikon; 2 x twin 0.303 in machine guns; 1 x 2 lb gun; 6 depth charges
- Armour: Wheelhouse plated

HMC ML Q054 was a wooden Canadian-built Fairmile B motor launch (ML) upgunned submarine chaser delivered to the Royal Canadian Navy (RCN) on 17 October 1941. Originally designed for the Royal Navy by W.J. Holt of the British Admiralty and built by British boatbuilder Fairmile Marine, during the Second World War eighty Fairmile B motor launches were built in Canada for service with the Coastal Forces of the RCN.

== Design ==
Built of double mahogany (diagonally) with an eight-inch oak keel and based on a line of destroyer hulls, the Fairmiles arrived in prefabricated kits to be assembled for the RCN by thirteen different boatyards. In contrast to the British built boats, the Canadian Fairmiles were narrower, had a greater draught, and were slightly more powerful giving the Canadian boats a two knot speed advantage over the British boats. With a fuel capacity of 2,320 gallons of 87 octane gasoline, the early Fairmiles (Q050 to Q111) were powered by two 650 hp engines, could reach a top speed of 20 knots (max), 16.5 knots sea speed and a range of 1925 miles at 7.5 knots. Later versions (Q112 to Q129) were fitted with larger 700 hp engines able to achieve a top speed to 22 knots (max), with a range of 1925 miles at 7.5 knots. Crewed by two or three officers and fourteen sailors, accommodation on the Fairmiles was thought to be "cramped but comfortable".

Another unique design feature of the Fairmile B was that with forty-eight hours notice each boat could be reconfigured to serve in a different role. Fitted with steel strips and tapped holes to ease equipment swaps, weapons and specialist gear such as torpedo tubes, mines, depth charges, and guns could be quickly stripped and attached to the boat. In two days, a Fairmile could have its weapons and equipment reconfigured to serve as an escort, minesweeper, minelayer, navigation leader, coastal raider, patrol boat, ambulance or rescue launch. "Armament consisted of three 20mm Oerlikon guns, mounted forward, aft and amidships; two .303 machine-guns; one 9mm Sten gun; two .303 rifles; three .45 revolvers; and 20 depth-charges of 300 Ibs each, including eight fitted for the "Y" gun. Each boat was equipped with sonar, radar and WIT."

The first thirty-six Canadian Fairmile B type were designated and painted up as CML 01-36 (coastal motor launch).

Although listed as being built by Greavette Boats Ltd. of Gravenhurst, Ontario, Q054 along with Q055, and Q056 which were subcontracted and commissioned at Sachau Marine Construction Limited at Humber Bay, Mimico.

== Fairmile flotillas ==
Affectionately known as the little ships, little fighting ships, or Q-boats by their crews, during the Second World War the Fairmile B motor launches of the RCN played a vital role escorting shipping along the St. Lawrence River, in the Gulf of St. Lawrence, and between Newfoundland and the mainland of Canada. Regularly deployed in flotillas of six The Little Ships relieved larger escort craft urgently needed elsewhere by carrying out anti-submarine patrols, port defence and rescue duties. Based out of shore establishments on the St. Lawrence River, Halifax, Saint John, Shelburne, Sydney and on the West Coast; at sea the RCN Fairmile Fleets were accompanied by two "mother ships" HMCS Preserver (F94) and HMCS Provider (F100) providing fresh water, fuel and medical services.

== Operational history ==
While she flew the White Ensign, Q054 was not a commissioned ship, but rather listed as a tender to escort depot ship HMCS Sambro. In December 1944, ML Q054 was listed as part of the RCN North-West Atlantic Command Gaspé Force (Administered by N.O. i/c., Gaspé), 71st Motor Launch Flotilla. After the Second World War she sold as surplus and sold by the War Assets Corporation (WAC) to Capt. E.J. Weaber c/o Marine Industries Ltd. Sorel (MIL), Sorel.
