= Preserver =

Preserver can refer to:

- Life preserver, a personal flotation device or lifebuoy
- Life preserver, a type of club (weapon)
- HMCS Preserver, a Canadian navy ship
  - HMCS Preserver (AOR 510), Protecteur-class supply ship
  - HMCS Preserver (1941), leadship of the Fairmile-support depot ships
- USS Preserver (ARS-8), a U.S. navy ship
- Preserver (Elfquest), a race in the fantasy comic Elfquest
- Preservers (Star Trek), a Star Trek species
- Preserver (Star Trek), a novel by William Shatner
