= Canadian Fairmile B motor launch =

Type of boat built by Canadian boatbuilders during the Second World War

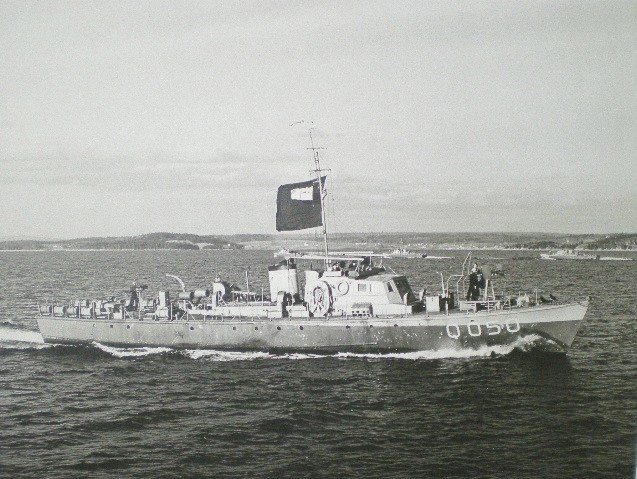
- HMC ML Q050 was the first of a series of wooden Canadian-built Fairmile B delivered to the Royal Canadian Navy (RCN) on 18 November 1941

Class overview
- Builders: See builders
- Operators: Royal Canadian Navy; Free French Naval Forces; United States Navy
- Built: 1941–1944
- In service: 1941–1945
- Completed: 88

General characteristics
- Class & type: Fairmile B motor launch
- Displacement: 79 long tons (80 t)
- Length: 112 ft (34 m)
- Beam: 17 ft 0 in (5.18 m)
- Draught: 4 ft 10 in (1.47 m)
- Propulsion: Two 650 bhp (480 kW) Hall-Scott Defender petrol engines
- Speed: 20 knots (37 km/h; 23 mph)
- Range: 1,500 mi (1,300 nmi; 2,400 km) at 12 knots (22 km/h; 14 mph)
- Complement: 2 officers and 14 non-commissioned
- Time to activate: 48 hours to reconfigure weapons
- Sensors & processing systems: ASDIC
- Armour: Wheelhouse plated

The Canadian Fairmile B was a motor launch built during the Second World War for the Royal Canadian Navy. They were adaptations of the British Fairmile B motor launch design incorporating slight modifications for Canadian climatic and operational conditions. Eighty-eight were built in Canada for service with the Coastal Forces of the Royal Canadian Navy in home waters, of which eight were supplied to the United States Navy.

They were known by their crews as "The Little Ships", "Little Fighting Ships", "Q-Boats", "MLs" or "Holy Rollers" (due to their violent pitching and tossing),

== History ==
In the spring of 1940 Canada's Naval Staff realized that the Royal Canadian Navy (RCN) needed more vessels equipped with ASDIC sets for anti-submarine patrols in the St. Lawrence River and Pacific Coast. Learning "that the Admiralty was planning to build Type "B" Fairmile motor launches for such work in British waters", the RCN began to investigate the comparative advantages of building and employing the Fairmile B motor launch (ML) in Canadian waters. By the end of 1940 with the first British Fairmile B motor launches completed, performance figures and a complete set of drawings and specifications were sent to Canada. Although unimpressed with the trial results that showed that the Fairmile B was not quite maneuverable at slow speeds required for the ASDIC to work correctly, the need for more anti-submarine vessels was so great that the Naval Staff proceeded with the program.

By April 1941, contracts for the first twenty-four Fairmile B boats was signed with seven builders in Ontario, three in British Columbia, and one in Nova Scotia for a "standard price for each vessel of $85,000 in the east and $76,000 in British Columbia." It was expected that the twenty-four boats would be delivered by the end of 1941 but shortages of resources and components delayed builders efforts. As such, only thirteen Fairmiles built in the Great Lakes region were delivered in 1941; nine in Halifax, Nova Scotia, and four laid up at Sarnia and Toronto, Ontario, due to winter storms. Once in Halifax, only four of the Fairmiles could be kept operational due to a general shortage of naval personnel and all other available crews being prioritized to corvettes and minesweepers.

In July 1941 the Naval Staff let out another contract for twelve MLs in order to help provide for the defence of Newfoundland and adjacent waters. Intended for anti-submarine patrols at St. John's, Botwood, and at Red Bay on the Strait of Belle Isle, continuing material shortages delayed the commissioning of these vessels to May and June 1942.

== Design ==
Originally designated and painted up as 'Coastal Motor Launch' (CML) 01–36, the Canadian Fairmile B was built of double mahogany wood with an eight-inch (200 mm) oak keel. Based on a line of destroyer hulls, they arrived in prefabricated kits, ready to be assembled for the RCN by a number of different boatyards. In contrast to the British built boats, the Canadian Fairmile was narrower, had a greater draught, and were slightly more powerful giving the Canadian boats a two-knot (3.7 km/h; 2.3 mph) speed advantage over the British boats. As one former Fairmile Captain described them, "sheathed for operation in ice and displacing 100 tons, they were indeed veritable 'Little Fighting Ships'." Crewed by two or three officers and 14 sailors, accommodation on the Fairmile B was thought to be "cramped but comfortable".

=== Propulsion ===
With a fuel capacity of 2,320 gallons of 87 octane gasoline, the early Fairmiles (Q050 to Q111) were powered by two 650-horsepower (480 kW) engines, could reach a speed of 20 knots (37 km/h; 23 mph) maximum, 16.5 knots (30.6 km/h; 19.0 mph) sea speed and had a range of 1,925 miles (1,673 nmi; 3,098 km) at 7.5 kn (13.9 km/h; 8.6 mph). Later versions (Q112 to Q129) were fitted with larger 700 hp (520 kW) engines able to achieve a top speed of 22 knots (41 km/h; 25 mph) with an identical range.

=== Armament ===
A unique design feature of the Fairmile B was that with forty-eight hours notice each boat could be reconfigured to serve in a different role. Fitted with steel strips and tapped holes to ease equipment swaps, weapons and specialist gear such as torpedo tubes, mines, depth charges, and guns could be quickly stripped and attached to the boat. In two days, a Fairmile could have its weapons and equipment reconfigured to serve as an escort, minesweeper, minelayer, navigation leader, coastal raider, patrol boat, ambulance or rescue launch. Small arms for the crew were a 9 mm Sten submachine gun, two .303 rifles, and three .45 revolvers

Each boat was equipped with sonar, radar and wireless telegraphy.

Example armament combinations
Armament	Upgunned sub chaser	Torpedo boat	Acoustic minesweeper
Aft	2 x 20 mm Oerlikon	-	2 x 20 mm Oerlikon
Amidships	1 x 20 mm Oerlikon	-	1 x 20 mm Oerlikon
Bridge wings	2 x twin 0.303 in machine guns	2 x twin 0.303 in machine guns	2 x twin 0.303 in machine guns
Forward	3 pdr high-angle/low-angle gun	3 pdr high-angle/low-angle gun	3 pdr high-angle/low-angle gun
Other	12 depth charges Holman Projector Y-gun (4 reloads)	2 x 21 in torpedo tubes Holman projector	14 depth charges
Armament	Moored minesweeper	Rescue boat	Canadian B type (final)
Aft	1 x 20 mm Oerlikon	1 x 20 mm Oerlikon	1 x 20 mm Oerlikon
Amidships	1 x 20 mm Oerlikon		1 x 20 mm Oerlikon
Bridge wings	2 x twin 0.303 in machine guns	2 x twin 0.303 in machine guns	
Forward	3 pdr high-angle/low-angle gun	2 pdr gun	1 x 20 mm Oerlikon
Other	6 depth charges Y-gun (0 reloads)	6 depth charges	14 depth charges Y-gun (7 reloads)

== Fairmile flotillas ==
During the Second World War the Canadian Fairmile B of the RCN played a vital role escorting shipping along the St. Lawrence River, in the Gulf of St. Lawrence, and between Newfoundland and the mainland of Canada. Regularly deployed in flotillas of six "The Little Ships" relieved larger escort craft urgently needed elsewhere by carrying out anti-submarine patrols, port defence and rescue duties. Based out of shore establishments on the St. Lawrence River, Halifax, Saint John, Shelburne, Sydney and on the West Coast; at sea the RCN Fairmile Fleets were accompanied by two "mother ships" HMCS Preserver and HMCS Provider providing fresh water, fuel and medical services.

== Vessels in class ==
List of Canadian-built Fairmile B
Name	Pennant #	Shipbuilder	Location	Ordered	Completed	Flotilla (December 1944)	Notes	Image
ML 050	Q 050	Midland Boat Works	Midland, Ontario	3 January 1941	18 November 1941	71st Flotilla – Gaspé Force	Originally designated and painted up as CML 001; Sold 1945 as Stanba I	
ML 051	Q 051	Midland Boat Works	Midland, Ontario	3 January 1941	24 November 1941	77th Flotilla – Halifax M.L. Force (SO)	Originally designated and painted up as CML 002. Sold 1946 as Radel II. Abandoned 2004	
ML 052	Q 052	Taylor & Sons, J. J.	Toronto, Ontario	3 January 1941	31 October 1941	Free French Navy – Newfoundland Force	Originally designated and painted up as CML 003. To Free French 1943 as Gallantry (V 111) Returned to RCN and sold 1949 as Cyrius. Later La Marie-Jo, active	
ML 053	Q 053	Taylor & Sons, J. J.	Toronto ON	3 January 1941	17 November 1941	71st Flotilla – Gaspé Force	Originally designated and painted up as CML 004 Sold 1945 as Aloma III	
ML 054	Q 054	Greavette Boats Ltd.	Gravenhurst ON	3 January 1941	17 October 1941	71st Flotilla – Gaspé Force	Originally designated and painted up as CML 005 Sold 1945	
ML 055	Q 055	Greavette Boats Ltd.	Gravenhurst, Ontario	3 January 1941	6 November 1941	71st Flotilla – Gaspé Force	Originally designated and painted up as CML 006 Sold 1945	
ML 056	Q 056	Greavette Boats Ltd.	Gravenhurst, Ontario	3 January 1941	24 November 1941	71st Flotilla – Gaspé Force (SO)	Originally designated and painted up as CML 007 Sold 1945 as Esso Ayacucho Scrapped 1957	
ML 057	Q 057	Minett-Shields, Ltd.	Bracebridge, Ontario	3 January 1941	28 October 1941	71st Flotilla – Gaspé Force	Originally designated and painted up as CML 008 Sold 1945	
ML 058	Q 058	Minett-Shields, Ltd.	Bracebridge, Ontario	3 January 1941	24 November 1941	72nd Flotilla – Sydney Force	Originally designated and painted up as CML 009 Sold 1945 as Katherine G Burnt 1949	
ML 059	Q 059	Minett-Shields, Ltd.	Bracebridge, Ontario	3 January 1941	26 May 1942	72nd Flotilla – Sydney Force	Originally designated and painted up as CML 010 Sold 1946 as Rodco	
ML 060	Q 060	Hunter Boats	Orillia, Ontario	3 January 1941	1 November 1941	72nd Flotilla – Sydney Force (SO)	Originally designated and painted up as CML 011 Sold 1945	
ML 061	Q 061	Hunter Boats	Orillia, Ontario	3 January 1941	11 November 1941	72nd Flotilla – Sydney Force	Originally designated and painted up as CML 012 Sold 1945 as Esso Concordia	
ML 062	Q 062	Mac-Craft Ltd.	Sarnia, Ontario	3 January 1941	18 April 1942	Free French Navy – Newfoundland Force	Originally designated and painted up as CML 013 To Free French 1942 as Langlade (V 112), reacquired 1954 as HMCS Wolf, breakwater 2003	
ML 063	Q 063	Mac-Craft Ltd.	Sarnia, Ontario	3 January 1941	18 April 1942	Free French Navy – Newfoundland Force	Originally designated and painted up as CML 014 To Free French 1942 as Colombier (V 113), later Cumbrae II	
ML 064	Q 064	LeBlanc Shipbuilding Co., J. H.	Weymouth, Nova Scotia	3 January 1941	15 May 1942	72nd Flotilla – Sydney Force	Originally designated and painted up as CML 015 Sold 1947 as Six-Four, foundered 1952	
ML 065	Q 065	LeBlanc Shipbuilding Co., J. H.	Weymouth, Nova Scotia	3 January 1941	15 May 1942	72nd Flotilla – Sydney Force	Originally designated and painted up as CML 016 Sold 1946 as Nadine II, later Audrey A, burnt 1978	
ML 066	Q 066	Vancouver Shipyards Co. Ltd.	Vancouver, British Columbia	3 January 1941	3 June 1942	75th Flotilla – Esquimalt Force	Originally designated and painted up as CML 017 Sold 1946 as Earlmar, gone 2010	
ML 067	Q 067	Vancouver Shipyards Co. Ltd.	Vancouver, British Columbia	3 January 1941	27 March 1942	75th Flotilla – Esquimalt Force	Originally designated and painted up as CML 018 Sold 1946 as Stranger II, burnt 1966	
ML 068	Q 068	A.C. Benson Shipyard	Vancouver, British Columbia	3 January 1941	7 August 1942	Flotilla unknown	Originally designated and painted up as CML 019 Sold 1946 as Salvor, later Marine Freight No. 1, Miss Linda	
ML 069	Q 069	A.C. Benson Shipyard	Vancouver, British Columbia	3 January 1941	28 March 1942	75th Flotilla – Esquimalt Force	Originally designated and painted up as CML 020 Sold 1945 as Harwood, Casa Mia, lost in hurricane 1978	
ML 070	Q 070	Star Shipyards (Mercer's) Ltd.	New Westminster, British Columbia	3 January 1941	14 March 1942	75th Flotilla – Esquimalt Force	Originally designated and painted up as CML 021 Sold 1945 as Machigonne, later Gulf Ranger, Coast Ranger, Saracen III, Lahaina Lady, Noble Lady, active	
ML 071	Q 071	Star Shipyards (Mercer's) Ltd.	New Westminster, British Columbia	3 January 1941	15 April 1942	75th Flotilla – Esquimalt Force (SO)	Originally designated and painted up as CML 022 Sold 1946 as Gulf Wing, later Troubadour III, Nimpkish Princess, Northland Princess, Kona Winds, Knight Time II, sank 2015	
ML 072	Q 072	Grew Boats Ltd.	Penetanguishene, Ontario	3 January 1941	24 November 1941	73rd Flotilla – New Brunswick Force (SO)	Originally designated and painted up as CML 023 Sold 1945	
ML 073	Q 073	Grew Boats Ltd.	Penetanguishene, Ontario	3 January 1941	24 November 1941	73rd Flotilla – New Brunswick Force	Originally designated and painted up as CML 024 Sold 1945	
ML 074	Q 074	Minett-Shields, Ltd.	Bracebridge ON	22 July 1941	26 May 1942	77th Flotilla – Halifax M.L. Force	Originally designated and painted up as CML 025 Sold 1945 as Aloma III, later Terra Mar	
ML 075	Q 075	Minett-Shields, Ltd.	Bracebridge, Ontario	22 July 1941	22 June 1942	73rd Flotilla – New Brunswick Force	Originally designated and painted up as CML 026 Sold 1945	
ML 076	Q 076	Minett-Shields, Ltd.	Bracebridge ON	22 July 1941	23 June 1942	73rd Flotilla – New Brunswick Force	Originally designated and painted up as CML 027 Sold 1945	
ML 077	Q 077	Greavette Boats Ltd.	Gravenhurst, Ontario	22 July 1941	2 June 1942	73rd Flotilla – New Brunswick Force	Originally designated and painted up as CML 028 Sold 1947 as Coastal Queen	
ML 078	Q 078	Greavette Boats Ltd.	Gravenhurst, Ontario	22 July 1941	2 June 1942	73rd Flotilla – New Brunswick Force	Originally designated and painted up as CML 029 Sold 1945 as Esso Cardinal	
ML 079	Q 079	Taylor & Sons, J. J.	Toronto ON	22 July 1941	27 May 1942	79th Flotilla – Gaspé Force	Originally designated and painted up as CML 030 Sold 1945 as Nancy Grace, reacquired 1954 as HMCS Raccoon, sold later as Lady Enid	
ML 080	Q 080	Taylor & Sons, J. J.	Toronto, Ontario	22 July 1941	17 June 1942	79th Flotilla – Gaspé Force	Originally designated and painted up as CML 031 Sold 1945 as Quarterdeck, later Almeta Queen, Cosa Grande, abandoned 2007	
ML 081	Q 081	Honey Harbour Nav. Co. Ltd.	Midland, Ontario	22 July 1941	27 May 1942	79th Flotilla – Gaspé Force (SO)	Originally designated and painted up as CML 032 Sold 1947 as Esso Taparita, burnt 1948	
ML 082	Q 082	Honey Harbour Nav. Co. Ltd.	Midland ON	22 July 1941	27 May 1942	Quebec City, Quebec No flotilla	Originally designated and painted up as CML 033 Sold 1945	
ML 083	Q 083	LeBlanc Shipbuilding Co., J. H.	Weymouth, Nova Scotia	22-Jul 1941	25-May 1942	79th Flotilla – Gaspé Force	Originally designated and painted up as CML 034 Sold 1945 as Lazy Mariner	
ML 084	Q 084	LeBlanc Shipbuilding Co., J. H.	Weymouth, Nova Scotia	22 July 1941	18 June 1942	79th Flotilla – Gaspé Force	Originally designated and painted up as CML 035 Sold 1946	
ML 085	Q 085	Hunter Boats	Orillia, Ontario	22 July 1941	13 June 1942	79th Flotilla – Gaspé Force	Originally designated and painted up as CML 036 Sold 1951 as Suzette No. 1	
ML 086	Q 086	Taylor & Sons, J. J.	Toronto ON	16 February 1942	26 October 1942	76th Flotilla – Newfoundland Force	Sold 1946 as Monterey	
ML 087	Q 087	Taylor & Sons, J. J.	Toronto, Ontario	16 February 1942	9 November 1942	76th Flotilla – Newfoundland Force	Sold 1948 as Chef Tek8erimat, later Tzigane	
ML 088	Q 088	Taylor & Sons, J. J.	Toronto, Ontario	16 February 1942	5 October 1943	77th Flotilla – Halifax M.L. Force	Sold 1946 as Eighty-Eight, later Olympia III, burnt	
ML 089	Q 089	Greavette Boats Ltd.	Gravenhurst, Ontario	16 February 1942	15 October 1942	76th Flotilla – Newfoundland Force	Sold 1949 as Coastal Queen, later Grand Commander, Corniche	
ML 090	Q 090	Greavette Boats Ltd.	Gravenhurst, Ontario	16 February 1942	19 November 1942	78th Flotilla – Newfoundland Force	Sold 1945 as Louvicourt, later Rosal	
ML 091	Q 091	Greavette Boats Ltd.	Gravenhurst, Ontario	16 February 1942	17 May 1943	77th Flotilla – Halifax M.L. Force	Sold 1946 as Nine-One, sank 1955	
ML 092	Q 092	Hunter Boats	Orillia, Ontario	16 February 1942	2 November 1942	77th Flotilla – Halifax M.L. Force	Sold 1947 as Suzette II	
ML 093	Q 093	Hunter Boats	Orillia, Ontario	16 February 1942	2 November 1942	76th Flotilla – Newfoundland Force	Sold 1945	
ML 094	Q 094	Midland Boat Works	Midland, Ontario	16 February 1942	19 November 1942	77th Flotilla – Halifax M.L. Force	Sold 1945 as Ernest G	
ML 095	Q 095	Midland Boat Works	Midland, Ontario	16 February 1942	12 May 1943	76th Flotilla – Newfoundland Force (SO)	Sold 1945 as Rodco	
ML 096	Q 096	Minett-Shields, Ltd.	Bracebridge, Ontario	16 February 1942	9 November 1942	76th Flotilla – Newfoundland Force	Sold 1945 as Roseline, later Miss Kingston, Saint-Louis IV, La Santa Maria IV, active	
ML 097	Q 097	Minett-Shields, Ltd.	Bracebridge, Ontario	16 February 1942	16 November 1942	76th Flotilla – Newfoundland Force	Sold 1945	
ML 098	Q 098	Grew Boats Ltd.	Penetanguishene, Ontario	16 February 1942	7 November 1942	76th Flotilla – Newfoundland Force	Sold 1948 as Corita, later Le Saint-Barnabe	
ML 099	Q 099	Grew Boats Ltd.	Penetanguishene, Ontario	16 February 1942	7 November 1942	77th Flotilla – Halifax M.L. Force	Sold 1948 as Dipedon, later Donarvie II	
ML 100	Q 100	Grew Boats Ltd.	Penetanguishene, Ontario	16 February 1942	7 November 1942	78th Flotilla – Newfoundland Force	Sold 1945	
ML 101	Q 101	Mac-Craft Ltd.	Sarnia, Ontario	16 February 1942	7 November 1942	78th Flotilla – Newfoundland Force	Sold 1945 as Edmar, later Nellie D	
ML 102	Q 102	Mac-Craft Ltd.	Sarnia, Ontario	16 February 1942	14 November 1942	77th Flotilla – Halifax M.L. Force	Sold 1945 as Quetzal, later Curlew, Salissa M, Moondance, Enterprise II	
ML 103	Q 103	Mac-Craft Ltd.	Sarnia, Ontario	16 February 1942	18 November 1942	78th Flotilla – Newfoundland Force (SO)	Sold 1947 as One-O-Three, later Lady Simone, scrapped	
ML 104	Q 104	Mac-Craft Ltd.	Sarnia, Ontario	October 1942	4 August 1943	70th M.L Flotilla (Detached to Royal Navy) – Bermuda (SO)	Sold 1945, reacquired 1954 as HMCS Cougar, scrapped 1959	
ML 105	Q 105	Mac-Craft Ltd.	Sarnia, Ontario	October 1942	5 September 1943	70th M.L Flotilla (Detached to Royal Navy) – Bermuda	Sold 1948 as Duc d'Orleans, scrapped 2007	
ML 106	Q 106	Grew Boats Ltd.	Penetanguishene, Ontario	October 1942	28 August 1943	70th M.L Flotilla (Detached to Royal Navy) – Bermuda	Sold 1945, reacquired 1954 as HMCS Beaver, scrapped 1957	
ML 107	Q 107	Grew Boats Ltd.	Penetanguishene, Ontario	October 1942	9 November 1943	70th M.L Flotilla (Detached to Royal Navy) – Bermuda	Sold 1949 as Miss Chevrolet, later Lady Latour, burnt 1951	
ML 108	Q 108	Midland Boat Works	Midland, Ontario	October 1942	13 August 1943	70th M.L Flotilla (Detached to Royal Navy) – Bermuda	Sold 1945 as Machigonne II	
ML 109	Q 109	Hunter Boats	Orillia, Ontario	October 1942	23 August 1943	70th M.L Flotilla (Detached to Royal Navy) – Bermuda	Sold 1948 as Quetzal II, later Arara, Aruba	
ML 110	Q 110	Minett-Shields, Ltd.	Bracebridge, Ontario	October 1942	8 July 1943	78th Flotilla – Newfoundland Force	Sold 1949	
ML 111	Q 111	LeBlanc Shipbuilding Co., J. H.	Weymouth, Nova Scotia	October 1942	9 September 1943	78th Flotilla – Newfoundland Force	Sold 1945, reacquired 1954 as HMCS Moose, sold 1956	
ML 112	Q 112	Taylor & Sons, J. J.	Toronto, Ontario	October 1942	25 October 43	82nd Flotilla – Sydney Force	To RCMP 1945 as Fort Walsh, wrecked 1958	
ML 113	Q 113	Taylor & Sons, J. J.	Toronto, Ontario	October 1942	20 November 1943	82nd Flotilla – Sydney Force	Sold 1947 as Laverniere, sank 1947	
ML 114	Q 114	Greavette Boats Ltd.	Gravenhurst, Ontario	October 1942	20 November 1943	82nd Flotilla – Sydney Force (SO)	To RCMP 1945 as Fort Selkirk, resold 1946 as Amy May, burnt 1955	
ML 115	Q 115	Mac-Craft Ltd.	Sarnia, Ontario	October 1942	16 November 1943	82nd Flotilla – Sydney Force	Sold 1945 as Nelvana, later Outre Mer	
ML 116	Q 116	Hunter Boats	Orillia, Ontario	October 1942	16 November 1944	82nd Flotilla – Sydney Force	Sold 1945, reacquired 1954 as HMCS Reindeer, burnt 1957	
ML 117	Q 117	Grew Boats Ltd.	Penetanguishene, Ontario	October 1942	16 November 1943	82nd Flotilla – Sydney Force	To RCMP 1945 as Fort Steele, resold 1946 as Nakomis, later Supertrader, Polar Clipper,	
ML 118	Q 118	Midland Boat Works	Midland, Ontario	October 1942	6 November 43	82nd Flotilla – Sydney Force	Sold 1945 as Franlis III	
ML 119	Q 119	Minett-Shields, Ltd.	Bracebridge, Ontario	October 1942	16 November 1943	82nd Flotilla – Sydney Force	To RCMP 1945 as Fort Pitt, resold 1946 as Sondra II, active	
ML 120	Q 120	LeBlanc Shipbuilding Co., J. H.	Weymouth, Nova Scotia	October 1942	27 January 1944	82nd Flotilla – Sydney Force	Sold 1945 as Nelvana II, later Osceola, The Lady Galadriel, Independence, Maryland Independence	
ML 121	Q 121	LeBlanc Shipbuilding Co., J. H.	Weymouth, Nova Scotia	October 1942	17 April 1944	82nd Flotilla – Sydney Force	Retained 1945, intended to be HMCS Cataraqui but sold 1953 as Inshore Fisherman, later Denis D, scrapped 1977	
ML 122	Q 122	Vancouver Shipyards Co. Ltd.	Vancouver, British Columbia	October 1942	17 May 1944	Prince Rupert, British Columbia No Flotilla	Sold 1945 as Malibu Tyee, later Nancy N. Seymour, Sogno d'Oro, active	
ML 123	Q 123	Vancouver Shipyards Co. Ltd.	Vancouver, British Columbia	October 1942	6 October 1944	Vancouver, British Columbia No Flotilla	Sold 1945 as Malibu Marlin, later Toluca	
ML 124	Q 124	Vancouver Shipyards Co. Ltd.	Vancouver, British Columbia	October 1942	30 June 1944	Esquimalt, British Columbia No Flotilla	Sold 1945, reacquired 1954 as HMCS Elk, resold 1954 as Teirrah, later Pacific Gold	
ML 125	Q 125	Star Shipyards (Mercer's) Ltd.	New Westminster, British Columbia	October 1942	22-Jul-44	Esquimalt, British Columbia No Flotilla	Sold 1945 as Malibu Tillikum, later Yorkeen, Campana, Jornholm, Gulfstream II, laid up, to be scrapped	
ML 126	Q 126	Star Shipyards (Mercer's) Ltd.	New Westminster, British Columbia	October 1942	8 July 1944	Vancouver, British Columbia No Flotilla	Sold 1945 as Princess Malibu	
ML 127	Q 127	Star Shipyards (Mercer's) Ltd.	New Westminster, British Columbia	October 1942	27 September 1944	Unallocated motor launch Esquimalt, British Columbia	Sold 1945 as Chief Malibu	
ML 128	Q 128	A.C. Benson Shipyard	Vancouver, British Columbia	October 1942	29 July 1944	Vancouver, British Columbia No Flotilla	Sold 1945 as Princess Louise Inlet, burnt 1955	
ML 129	Q 129	A.C. Benson Shipyard	Vancouver, British Columbia	October 1942	16 October 1944	Esquimalt, British Columbia Unallocated motor launch	Sold 1945 as Malibu Inez, later Huntress, Viking, Island Adventures	

== Canadian Fairmile Bs in foreign service ==
=== French Free Forces Fairmiles ===
In February 1943, ML Q052, Q062 and Q063 were transferred to the Free French Forces and stationed at St. Pierre and Miquelon under the command of Flag Officer, Newfoundland. After the war, the French Fairmiles were returned to the RCN.

=== United States ===
Eight Canadian Fairmiles (Q392 through Q399) were built by Le Blanc for the Royal Navy (RN) and were transferred under Lend-Lease to the United States Navy (USN) as US coastal protection had been depleted by transferring ships to the RN for convoy work. The USN used the Canadian-built Fairmiles as submarine chasers giving them the hull codes SC-1466 to SC-1473.

Fairmile Bs built in Canada in service with the United States Navy
Name	Pennant #	Shipbuilder	Location	Completed	Notes
ML 392	Q 392	LeBlanc Shipbuilding Co., J. H.	Weymouth, Nova Scotia	26 September 1942	To USN as SC-1466, to Mexico 1943
ML 393	Q 393	LeBlanc Shipbuilding Co., J. H.	Weymouth, Nova Scotia	26 June 1942	To USN as SC-1467, scrapped 1948
ML 394	Q 394	LeBlanc Shipbuilding Co., J. H.	Weymouth, Nova Scotia	1 October 1942	To USN as SC-1468, scrapped 1948
ML 395	Q 395	LeBlanc Shipbuilding Co., J. H.	Weymouth, Nova Scotia	26 September 1942	To USN as SC-1469, to Mexico 1943
ML 396	Q 396	LeBlanc Shipbuilding Co., J. H.	Weymouth, Nova Scotia	23 October 1942	To USN as SC-1470, later Panther (IX-105), scrapped 1947
ML 397	Q 397	LeBlanc Shipbuilding Co., J. H.	Weymouth, Nova Scotia	23 October 1942	To USN as SC-1471, to Mexico 1943
ML 398	Q 398	LeBlanc Shipbuilding Co., J. H.	Weymouth, Nova Scotia	5 December 1942	To USN as SC-1472, scrapped 1948
ML 399	Q 399	LeBlanc Shipbuilding Co., J. H.	Weymouth, Nova Scotia	5 December 1942	To USN as SC-1473, scrapped 1948

== Surviving examples ==
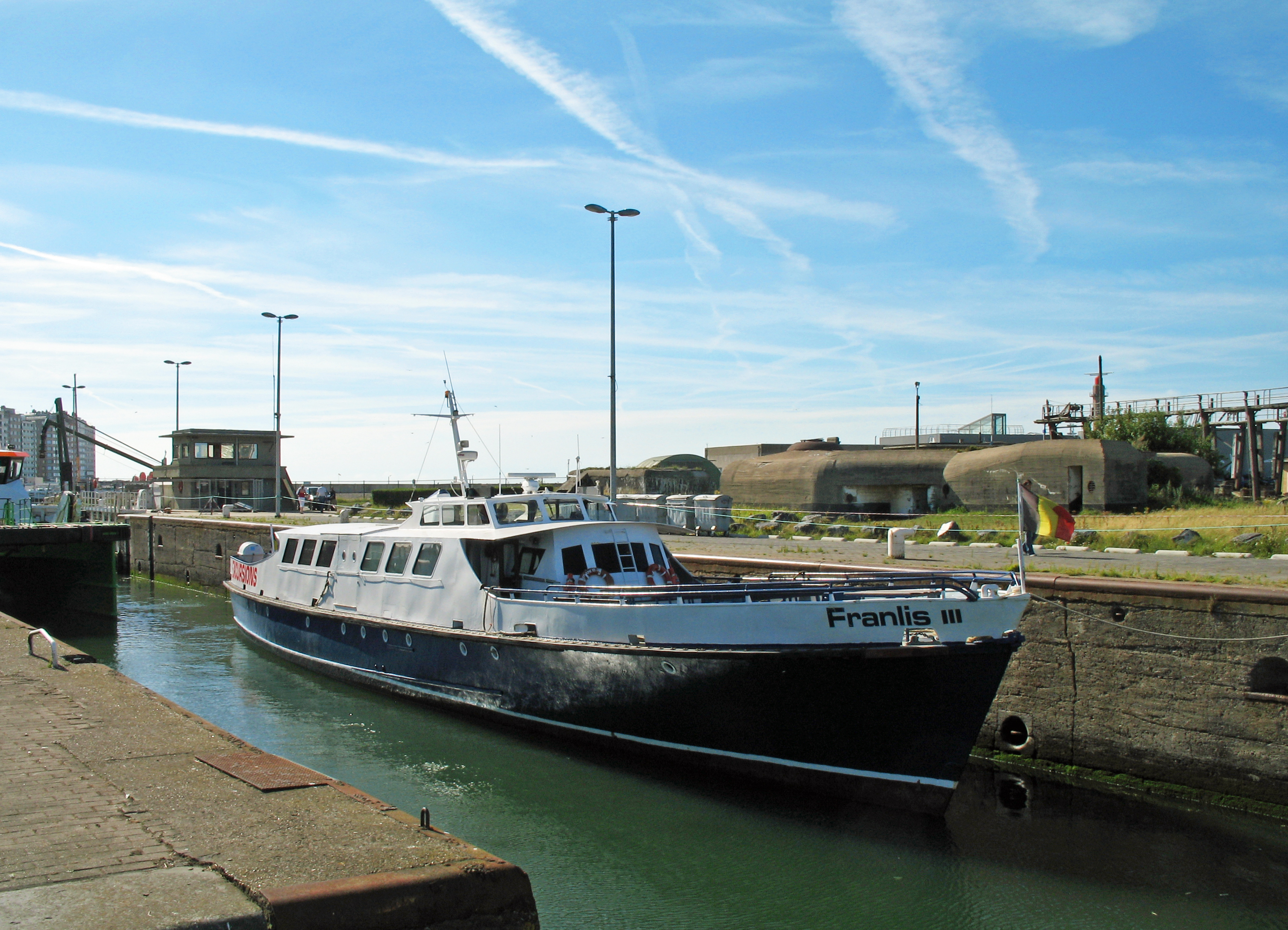
Belgian excursion vessel Franlis III (Ex HMC ML Q118) in the port of Ostend (Belgium)
