= HMCS Preserver =

HMCS Preserver is the name of three ships of the Royal Canadian Navy:

- HMCS Preserver (1941), leadship of the Fairmile-support depot ships
- HMCS Preserver (AOR 510), a Protecteur-class replenishment oiler
- HMCS Preserver, formerly named HMCS Châteauguay, a planned Protecteur-class auxiliary vessel

== Battle Honours ==
- Arabian Sea

== See also ==
- Preserver-class Fairmile depot ship
