= Coastal Forces of the Royal Canadian Navy =

Coastal Forces of the RCN
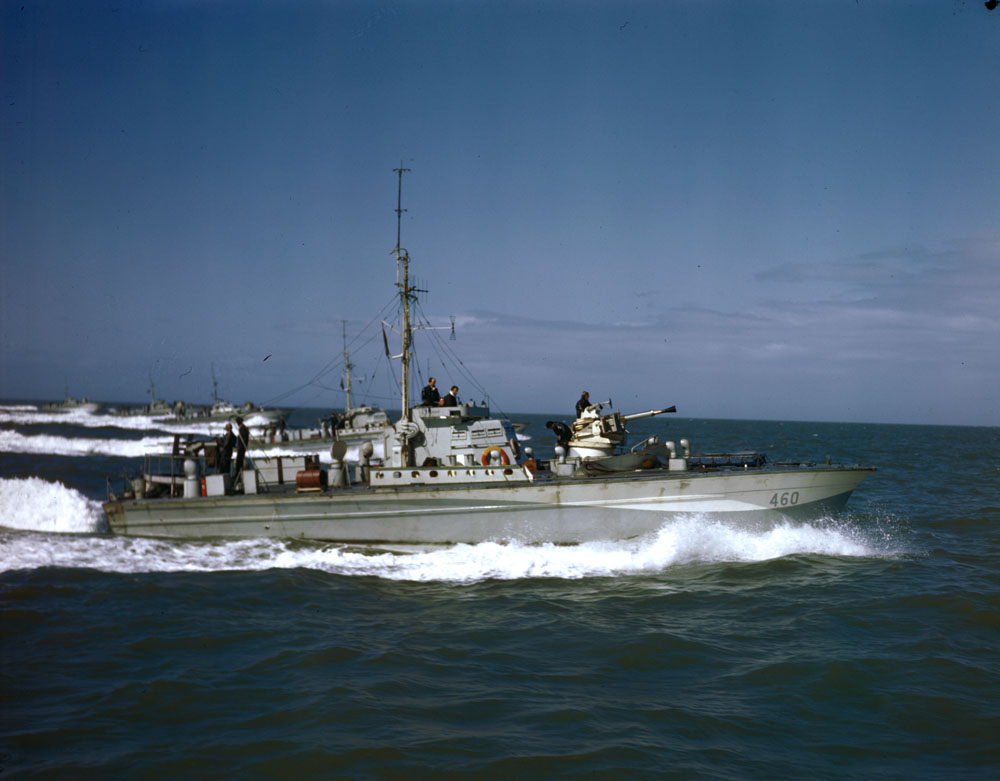
- MTB 460
- Active: 1941–1945
- Country: Canada
- Branch: Royal Canadian Navy
- Type: Naval force
- Role: Escort; Coastal defence; Anti-submarine operations; Minesweeping; Search and rescue
- Nickname: The Fairmile Flotillas
- Equipment: Canadian Fairmile B motor launch; Scott-Paine G-class motor torpedo boats; Fairmile D motor torpedo boat
- Engagements: Battle of the Atlantic; Battle of the St. Lawrence; D Day

Commanders
- Commanders: Commander-in-Chief, Canadian Northwest Atlantic; Commanding Officer Pacific Coast

The Coastal Forces of the Royal Canadian Navy (RCN) was a specialized naval force of well-armed, small and fast motor launch (ML) and motor torpedo boat (MTB) flotillas, primarily crewed by members of the Royal Canadian Naval Volunteer Reserve (RCNVR). Tasked with escort, coastal defence, anti-submarine, minesweeping and search and rescue duties, the Coastal Forces of the RCN contributed to securing Allied sea lines of communication off the coasts of Canada and Britain during the Second World War.

== Origins ==
With the outbreak of war in Europe, a number of Canadian naval reservists recruited by the Royal Navy (RN) crossed the Atlantic to join the Coastal Forces of the RN. With some sailors and officers spending the duration of the war as fully integrated members of the British MTB flotillas, others were assigned to form the nucleus of what would become the Canadian 29th and 65th MTB flotillas. Back home in Canada, the RCN emulated the British Coastal Forces concept by building and employing the British-designed Fairmile B motor launch for operations off the coast of Canada and in the Caribbean.

== Home waters ==
=== RCN Fairmile flotillas (1941–1945) ===
Affectionately known by their crews as The Little Ships, Little Fighting Ships, Q-Boats, MLs or Holy Rollers, due to their violent pitching and tossing, during the Second World War the Fairmile Bs of the RCN played a vital role in escorting shipping along the Saint Lawrence River, in the Gulf of Saint Lawrence, and between Newfoundland and the mainland of Canada. Regularly deployed in flotillas of six, The Little Ships relieved larger escort craft urgently needed elsewhere by carrying out anti-submarine patrols, port defence and rescue duties in home waters. Based out of shore establishments on the Saint Lawrence River, Halifax, Saint John, Shelburne, Sydney and on the British Columbia Coast; at sea the RCN Fairmile flotillas were accompanied by two "mother ships" HMCS Preserver and HMCS Provider providing fresh water, fuel and medical services.

==== Canadian Fairmile B ====
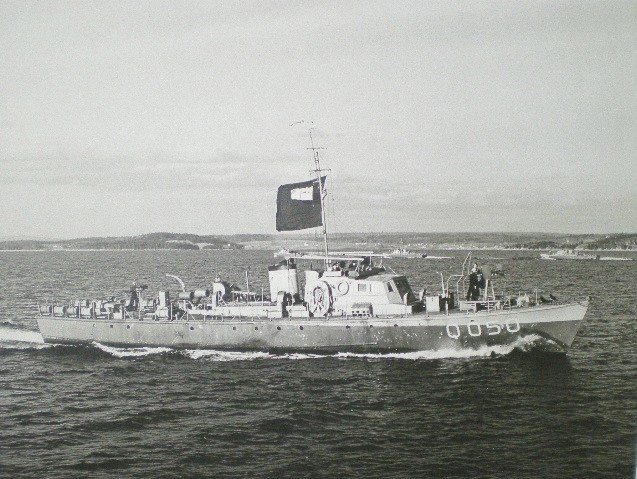
HMC ''ML Q050'' was the first of a series of wooden Canadian-built Fairmile B motor launch (ML) boats delivered to the Royal Canadian Navy (RCN) on 18 November 1941

Originally designed for the RN by W.J. Holt of the Office of the Admiralty and Marine Affairs and built by British boatbuilder Fairmile Marine, during the Second World War, eighty-eight Fairmile B motor launches, with slight modifications for Canadian climatic and operational conditions, were built in Canada for service with the RCN in home waters. While they flew the White Ensign, the Canadian Fairmiles were not commissioned ships of the RCN, but rather listed as a tenders to the escort depot ship HMCS Sambro. As one former Q-Boat captain described them, "sheathed for operation in ice and displacing 100 tons, they were indeed veritable 'Little Fighting Ships'."

Originally designated and painted up as CML (coastal motor launch) 01–36, the Canadian Fairmile B was built of double mahogany wood with an 8-inch (200 mm) oak keel. Based on a line of destroyer hulls, they arrived in prefabricated kits, ready to be assembled for the RCN by thirteen different boatyards. In contrast to the British built boats, the Canadian Fairmiles were narrower, had a greater draught, and were slightly more powerful giving the Canadian MLs a 2-knot (3.7 km/h; 2.3 mph) speed advantage over the British boats.

With a fuel capacity of 2,320 US gallons (8,800 L; 1,930 imp gal) of 87 octane gasoline, the early Fairmiles (Q050 to Q111) were powered by two 650 hp engines, could reach a top speed of 20 knots (37 km/h; 23 mph) (max), 16.5 knots (30.6 km/h; 19.0 mph) sea speed and a range of 1,925 miles (3,098 km) at 7.5 knots (13.9 km/h; 8.6 mph). Later versions (Q112 to Q129) were fitted with larger 700 hp engines able to achieve a top speed to 22 knots (41 km/h; 25 mph) (max), with a range of 1,925 miles (3,098 km) at 7.5 knots (13.9 km/h; 8.6 mph). Crewed by two or three officers and 14 sailors, accommodation on the Fairmiles was thought to be "cramped but comfortable".

Another unique design feature of the Fairmile B was that with forty-eight hours notice each boat could be reconfigured to serve in a different role. Fitted with steel strips and tapped holes to ease equipment swaps, weapons and specialist gear such as torpedo tubes, mines, depth charges, and guns could be quickly stripped and attached to the boat. In two days, a Fairmile could have its weapons and equipment reconfigured to serve as an escort, minesweeper, minelayer, navigation leader, coastal raider, patrol boat, ambulance or rescue launch. "Armament consisted of three 20 mm Oerlikon guns, mounted forward, aft and amidships; two .303 machine-guns; one 9 mm Sten gun; two .303 rifles; three .45 revolvers; and 20 depth-charges of 300 pounds (140 kg) each, including eight fitted for the "Y" gun. Each boat was equipped with sonar, radar and WIT."

==== Operations ====
With rumours of vessels sunk by German U-boats inside Canadian waters, shipbuilders on the Great Lakes and inland waterways of Ontario urgently worked to churn out more MLs, with the first nine arriving in Halifax in the fall of 1941. Since the attention was focused on training and manning newly constructed corvettes and minesweepers for the protection of ocean convoys headed to England, little interest was paid to the newly arrived Fairmiles. Equipped with their unique gasoline engines, motor mechanics were particularly sought for and throughout the winter of 1941-42 extensive recruitment, training and preparation of the new boats and crews was undertaken.

Forming part of the escort force for convoys from Rimouski to Sydney and between St. John's to Sydney, thirty newly trained Fairmile crews and their mothership HMCS Preserver were declared operational in 1942. Six MLs were stationed at Gaspé, two at Rimouski, six at Sydney, eight at Halifax and eight at St. John's, Newfoundland. With the majority of the RCN fleet focused on the Battle of the Atlantic in 1942, RCN allocated a small force of two corvettes, five Bangor-class minesweepers and eight MLs for the protection of shipping in the Saint Lawrence. Meanwhile, in Newfoundland and Halifax, ML crews were relieved from convoy escort duty and placed on long and uninteresting anti-submarine patrols, where although contacts were made, no evidence of a “kill” were. By the end of the year, fifteen new MLs joined the RCN fleet and throughout the winter ML crews prepared to take on the U-boat challenge in the coming new year.

Down south, the United States Navy (USN) faced a shortage of escorts and crews with operational experience, so in 1942 twelve Canadian Fairmiles were called upon to provide escort and coastal defence services in Bermuda and the Caribbean Sea. Tasked with countering lurking German U-boats, the 72nd and 73rd ML Flotillas (each of six boats) left Halifax in mid-December for Trinidad via Boston and other east coast ports. Upon reaching Savannah, Georgia, the 72nd ML Flotilla was forced to return home due to the stress foul weather put on the boats and crews during the transit south. Despite the 72nd Flotilla returning home, the 73nd Flotilla continued their trip south and operated out of Miami and Key West under the command of (U.S.) Commander, Gulf Sea Frontier until the spring of 1943.

Back home, listed as part of the 71st Flotilla – Gaspé Force, on 8 June 1943 HMC ML 053 was credited with recovering an intact mine laid in the Halifax approaches by the German submarine U-119. While following minesweeper HMS BYMS 2189, the crew of ML Q053 observed a floating mine cut loose by the sweeper and with a 90-yard tow line attached, moved the mine to Ketch Harbour. Not knowing if the mine was magnetic or time-fuzed to explode after surfacing, during the long tow to harbour, the crew of ML 053 were kept forward under cover. Once the mine was brought ashore, Lieutenant (Temp) George Rundle (RCNR) with the assistance of Leading Seaman Lancien, removed the access plate to the mine, cut the electrical wiring and extracted the detonator and primer. "For displaying gallantry, skill and coolness in carrying out hazardous duties" Lt George Rundle was awarded the George Medal and LS Lancien the British Empire Medal.

In February 1943, MLs 052, 062 and 063 were transferred to the Free French Forces and stationed at St. Pierre and Miquelon under the command of Flag Officer, Newfoundland. After the war, these "French Fairmiles" were returned to the RCN.

==== RCN Fairmile flotilla organisation in December 1944 ====
Atlantic Northwest Command, Commander-in-Chief, Canadian Northwest Atlantic
Gaspé Force (Administered by Naval Officer in Command, Gaspé)			Sydney Force ( Administered by Naval Officer in Command, Sydney)		Newfoundland Force (Administered by Flag Officer Newfoundland Force St. John's)			Halifax Local Defence Force (Administered by Captain M.L.s at Halifax)			New Brunswick Force (Administered by Naval Officer in Command, Saint John)
HMCS Fort Ramsey, Gaspé		Unassigned	Sydney Force ( Administered by Naval Officer in Command, Sydney)		Base supply ship HMCS Preserver, St. John's		Base supply ship HMCS Provider, Bermuda		Halifax M.L. Force		HMCS Captor II, Saint John
HMCS Fort Ramsey, Gaspé		Unassigned	HMCS Stadacona, Halifax			Free French Forces (Note: Q-Boats with Free French Naval Forces were crewed and maintained by French Canadians)	Base supply ship HMCS Provider, Bermuda		Halifax M.L. Force		HMCS Captor II, Saint John
HMCS Fort Ramsey, Gaspé		Unassigned	HMCS Stadacona, Halifax			Free French Forces	Base supply ship HMCS Provider, Bermuda		HMCS Avalon, St. John's		HMCS Captor II, Saint John
71st M.L. Flotilla	79th M.L. Flotilla	Unassigned	72nd M.L. Flotilla	82nd M.L. Flotilla	76th M.L. Flotilla	Free French Forces	78th M.L. Flotilla	70th M.L. Flotilla (Note: 70th ML Flotilla was detached on duty with the RN operating from Bermuda under the operational control of Senior British Naval Officer Western Atlantic (S.B.N.O.W.A.T.))	77th Flotilla	Motor launch	73rd M.L. Flotilla
Gaspé		Quebec	Sydney		St. John's	St. Pierre and Miquelon	Sydney	Bermuda	Halifax		Saint John
Q.056(SO) (Note: SO – Senior Officer); Q.050; Q.053; Q.054; Q.055; Q.057	Q.081^{(SO)}; Q.079; Q.080; Q.083; Q.084; Q.085	Q.082	Q.060^{(SO)}; Q.058; Q. 059; Q.061; Q.064; Q.065	Q.114^{(SO)}; Q.112; Q.113; Q.115; Q.117; Q.118; Q.119; Q.120; Q.121	Q.095^{(SO)}; Q.086; Q.087; Q.089; Q.093; Q.096; Q.097; Q.098	Colombier (Q.063); Galantry (Q.052); Langlade (Q.062)	Q.103^{(SO)}; Q.090; Q.100; Q.101; Q.110; Q.111	Q.104^{(SO)}; Q.105; Q.106; Q.107; Q.108; Q.109	Q.051^{(SO)}; Q.074; Q.088; Q.091; Q.092; Q.094; Q.099; Q.102	*Q.116	Q.072 (SO); Q.073; Q.075; Q.076; Q.077; Q.078

Pacific Coast Command Flag of Commanding Officer Pacific Coast – Ashore at Vancouver
Esquimalt Force (Administered by Capt. (D), Esquimalt)		Prince Rupert Force (Administered by Naval Officer in Command, Prince Rupert) Under orders of Commandant, North-Eastern Sea Frontier			Vancouver Force (Administered by Naval Officer in Command, Vancouver)
HMCS Givenchy (III)		Prince Rupert Force (Administered by Naval Officer in Command, Prince Rupert) Under orders of Commandant, North-Eastern Sea Frontier			Vancouver Force (Administered by Naval Officer in Command, Vancouver)
75th M.L. Flotilla	Unassigned	Prince Rupert Force (Administered by Naval Officer in Command, Prince Rupert) Under orders of Commandant, North-Eastern Sea Frontier			Vancouver Force (Administered by Naval Officer in Command, Vancouver)
Esquimalt		Prince Rupert	Esquimalt	Vancouver	Vancouver
Q.071^{(SO)}; Q.066; Q.067; Q.068; Q.069; Q.070	Q.124; Q.125	Q.122	Q.127; Q.129	Q.123; Q.128	Q.126

== Overseas service ==
In the opening months of the Second World War, the RN was permitted to actively recruit Canadians for the war effort in Europe and by 1943 more than one hundred RCN officers joined the British coastal forces. Skillfully commanding fast attack craft in the English Channel and the Mediterranean Sea, the performance of the Canadian MTB officers and sailors led to a British proposal in 1943 that the RCN man two MTB flotillas in preparation for the invasion of Europe.

=== 29th MTB Flotilla (1944–1945) ===
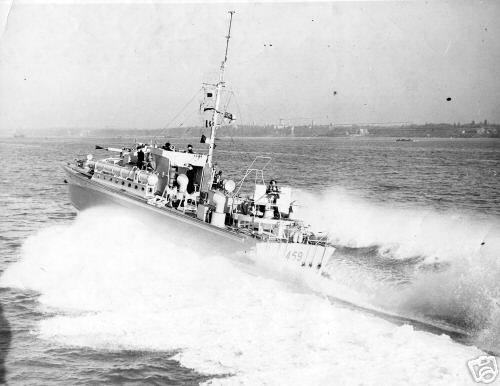
MTB 459 of the 29th Canadian MTB Flotilla

The 29th MTB flotilla had a short & distinguished history in the English Channel, including action during the landings at Normandy. Formed in March 1944 under the command of an experienced Lt Anthony Law (RCNVR) and equipped with eight British built 71 ft 6ins (Mk.VI) G-type MTBs, the 29th MTB flotilla conducted initial work up training at HMS Bee Coastal Forces base at Holyhead throughout the month of April 1944, moving to its first operational base HMS Fervent Coastal Forces base at Ramsgate in May 1944.

The first mission assigned to the 29th MTB Flotilla was given to MTBs 460,462,464 and 465. Tasked with escorting a clandestine mine gathering expedition to the German controlled Normandy coast, on 16 May 1944 the Canadian MTBs proceeded to the French coast along with two British MTBs, protecting them as volunteers were landed ashore by outboards to lift sample mines from the German beach defence. Managing to accomplish their mission undetected, the captured mines provided much needed intelligence prior to the Allied D-Day landings.

Between 20–22 May 1944, the 29th MTB Flotilla joined RCN Tribal-class destroyers and the 65th MTB Flotilla in intercepting enemy coastal convoys in the English Channel. Targeting German schnellboote (E-boats), escort ships, merchant vessels; the MTBs lured German destroyers within the gun range of accompanying heavier warships. Following this success, on 27 May 1944 the 29th MTB Flotilla moved to HMS Hornet Coastal Forces base at Gosport (Portsmouth), in preparation for Operation Neptune in June 1944.

During the Normandy invasion on June 6, 1944, the 29th MBT Flotilla was tasked with guarding the east flank of the invasion fleets, while the 65th MBT Flotilla was assigned to protect the western flank. Following the invasion, the MTBs of the 29th MBT Flotilla patrolled the 15 km distance between the eastern edge of the assault area and the German naval base at Le Havre. Each night three or four Canadian MTBs waited until larger Allied ships tracked the German surface ships attempting either to attack the allied assault area or transport supplies into Le Havre. Typically, short, sharp engagements followed, with the Germans turning back to safety once they realized Allied forces were in place. The 29th MBT Flotilla carried out this duty through August 1944, and in the words of the 29th MBT flotilla commander:

“The officers and men were beginning to show the strain caused by months of these nerve wracking operations, and this combined with irregular meals was responsible for many of us losing weight. The 29th was battle-weary, and we were beginning to feel that we could not last much longer under the severe conditions: mines going off, shore batteries pounding on us; and dive bombers, like vicious bats, roaring out of the night and putting the fear of God into us…the personnel of the 29th were falling victim to horrible, haunting fears, and the boats, whose arduous task of defending the anchorage had almost burned them out, were badly in need of repair.”

— Lt Cdr Anthony Law, RCNVR

Based at Coastal Forces base HMS Beehive at Felixstowe in October 1944, the 29th MBT Flotilla was later transferred to Coastal Forces Mobile Unit (CFMU) No. 1, Ostend, Belgium where disaster struck. The 29th MBT Flotilla was disbanded shortly after five Canadian boats were sunk & twenty-six sailors were killed by an explosion while alongside at Ostend, on 14 February 1945. After the disbandment of the 29th MTB Flotilla, the remaining Canadian boats were attached to other RN flotillas for the duration of the war.

==== 71ft 6ins (Mk.VI) G-type MTB ====
Built by the British Power Boat Company (BPB) at the Hythe, Southampton boat yard, originally eight G-type MTBs (459, 460, 461, 462, 463, 464, 465, 466) were assigned to the 29th MTB Flotilla with three more boats (485, 486, 491) added later to replace damaged or sunken MTB's. Originally designed as motor gun boats (MGBs), they were modified and re-designated as MTBs. Driven by three Rolls-Royce or Packard V-12 Supercharged 1250 H.P. engines, each with a 2,500 US gallons (9,500 L; 2,100 imp gal) capacity of 100 octane gas, these vessels had an operational radius of about 140 miles (230 km) while cruising at 25 knots (46 km/h; 29 mph), and a top speed of some 40 knots (74 km/h; 46 mph). MTB 486 is the only known MTB of the 29th MTB Flotilla to survive into the 21st century as a civilian houseboat renamed Sungo.

=== 65th MTB Flotilla (1944–1945) ===
The RCN 65th Motor Torpedo Boat Flotilla had a dissimilar experience than their 29th MBT Flotilla brethren. Operating their British-built Fairmile D MTBs out of Plymouth, the 65th MTB Flotilla was tasked with patrolling Allied convoy routes and conducting striking German shipping along the coast of northern Brittany. The 65th MTB Flotilla first went into action the night of 22–23 May 1944 and engaged a German convoy, protected by E-boats, in the English Channel. The action resulted in two E-Boats sunk, with two members of the 65th killed and several wounded. On 5 July 1944, three MTBs of the 65th attacked a convoy off Saint-Malo. Firing flares to light up the enemy convoy and then launching every torpedo they carried, followed by accurate gunfire, the MTBs of the 65th sunk two ships and possibly a third despite receiving considerable damage to themselves.

Along with the 10th Destroyer Flotilla, the 65th MBT Flotilla was key in enforcing a close blockade of Brittany ports, choking off all enemy movements, and denying the Germans any seaward escape route as American General George Patton's Third US Army swept across Brittany in August 1944. The 65th MTB Flotilla was decommissioned after more than a year of almost constant action with German E-boats, räumboote (R-boats) and armed trawlers along the coast of the English Channel prior to the invasion of France. In the course of 464 actions in British home waters (North Sea and English Channel) Canadian and British coastal forces were responsible for the destruction of 40 enemy merchant ships of some 59,650 tons.

Senior Officer	Lieutenant-Commander J.R.H. Kirkpatrick, DSC, RCNVR

==== Fairmile D MTB ====
The Fairmile D was a British MTB designed by Bill Holt and conceived by Fairmile Marine for the Royal Navy. Nicknamed "Dog Boats", they were designed to combat the known advantages of the German E-boats over previous British coastal craft designs. Larger than earlier MTB or motor gun boat (MGB) designs, the Fairmile D was driven by four Packard 12-cylinder 1250 hp supercharged patrol engines and could achieve 29 knots (54 km/h; 33 mph) (54 km/h; 33 mph) at full load. The boat carried 5,200 US gallons (20,000 L; 4,300 imp gal) of 100 octane gas for a range at maximum continuous speed of 506 nautical miles (937 km; 582 mi).

65th Canadian MTB Flotilla
Ship	Shipbuilder	Location	Transferred to the RCN	Removed from RCN service	Returned to RN	Image
MTB 726	A. M. Dickie & Sons	Bangor, Wales, UK	02-Mar-44	22-May-45	22-May-45	MTB 726
MTB 727	S.B. Hall	Glampton, England, UK	07-Jan-44	21-May-45	21-May-45	MTB 727
MTB 735	Tough Bros. Ltd.	Teddington, England, UK	26-Feb-44	21-Jun-45	21-Jun-45	MTB 735
MTB 736	Tough Bros. Ltd.	Teddington, England, U.K.	Apr-44	18-May-45	18-May-45	MTB 736
MTB 743	Aldous Successors Ltd.	Brightlingsea, England, U.K.	13-Apr-44	31-May-45	1945	MTB 743
MTB 744	Risdon Beazley Ltd.	Northam, England, U.K.	14-Feb-44	1945	1945	
MTB 745	Austins of East Ham Ltd.	London, England, U.K.	15-Jan-44	19-May-45	1945	MTB 745
MTB 746	James A. Silver Ltd.	Rosneath, Scotland, U.K.	19-May-44	18-May-45	18-May-45	
MTB 748	William Osborne Ltd.	Littlehampton, England, U.K.	19-Feb-44	23-May-45	23-May-45	MTB 748
MTB 797	A. M. Dickie & Sons	Bangor, Wales, U.K.	30-Dec-44	21-May-45	21-May-45	

== See also ==
- Canadian Fairmile B motor launch
- Canadian Power Boat Company
- Coastal Forces of World War II
- Coastal Forces of the Royal Navy
- Coastal Forces of the Royal Australian Navy
- Coastal Forces of the Royal New Zealand Navy
