= USS Panther (IX-105) =

American SC-1466-class submarine chaser

History

Canada
- Name: ML 396
- Builder: Leblanc Shipbuilding Co.
- Laid down: 1942
- Launched: 17 June 1942
- Identification: Pennant number: Q 396
- Fate: Transferred to United States, 1942

History

United States
- Name: Panther
- Namesake: Panther
- Commissioned: 23 October 1942
- Decommissioned: 9 July 1943
- Reclassified: SC-1470, April 1943; IX-105, 26 June 1943
- Stricken: 21 January 1946
- Identification: Callsign: NJCI; Hull number: PC-1470
- Fate: Scrapped, 13 February 1947

General characteristics
- Class & type: SC-1466 class submarine chaser
- Displacement: 99 t (97 long tons)
- Length: 111 ft 6 in (33.99 m)
- Beam: 17 ft 9 in (5.41 m)
- Draft: 5 ft 6 in (1.68 m)
- Installed power: 2 × shaft; 630 shp (470 kW)
- Propulsion: 2 × 12 cylinder Hall-Scott Defender petrol engines
- Speed: 15 knots (28 km/h; 17 mph)
- Range: 15,000 nmi (28,000 km; 17,000 mi) at 8 knots (15 km/h; 9.2 mph)
- Complement: 16 officer and enlisted
- Armament: as built: 2 × single 2-pounder naval guns; 1 × dual Lewis guns; 1 × Y-gun depth charge projector; 2 × depth charge racks; after refit: 2 × single 3-inch/23-caliber guns; 2 × single Oerlikon 20 mm cannons; 1 × Y-gun depth charge projector; 2 × depth charge racks

USS Panther (IX-105) was SC-1466-class submarine chaser during the World War II. Her namesake is a black variant of jaguars or leopards.

== Design and description ==
She has a displacement of 99 tons, length 111'6", beam 17'9", draft 5'6", speed 15 knots, complement 16. Her armaments consist of 2 2-pounders (dual purpose), 2 .30 caliber machine guns, 2 depth charge tracks, 1 depth charge projector (Y-gun).

== Construction and career ==
The vessel was built at the Leblanc Shipbuilding Co. at Weymouth, Nova Scotia. She was laid down in 1942 and launched on 17 June 1942. The ship was transferred to the U.S. Navy by Lt. Cmdr. Freeborn of the Royal Canadian Navy and commissioned as submarine chaser SC-1470 at her building yard on 23 October 1942.

=== 1942 ===
SC-1470 got underway for Digby, Nova Scotia, at 15:16 on 27 October 1942, but paused briefly alongside the Weymouth North Government Wharf to await her sister ship SC-1471, after which time she resumed her passage out of Weymouth. The new submarine chaser carried out gunnery trials on the 30th, expending 25 rounds of 2-pounder ammunition, two 300-pound depth charges, one Y-gun impulse charge, seven Holman projector grenades, and two hand flares. She reached Digby the next day.

Underway for the Boston Navy Yard at 10:30 on 31 October 1942, again in company with SC-1471, the two vessels became separated during the trip, necessitating SC-1470’s firing a flare and three rounds of 2-pounder ammunition “to enable her to locate us.” SC-1471 regained position at 08:52 on 1 November. Almost an hour into the afternoon watch, SC-1470 moored alongside SC-1463 at the Boston Navy Yard's South Boston Annex. The next afternoon, the submarine chaser shifted to another pier, alongside an ammunition lighter to which she transferred booster charges, Holman grenades and impulse cartridges for their projectors, depth charges, pistols, 2-pounder shells, impulse charges, signal flares and arbors, returning thence to her previous mooring.

Completing her fitting-out period on 23 November 1942, the vessel was rearmed at Boston, with U.S. 3-inch/23 caliber guns replacing the British 2-pounder weapons with which she had been equipped. SC-1470 got underway on 30 November to conduct structural firing trials. She expended three Mk. VII depth charges, four rounds of 3-inch/23 caliber, and 75 rounds of 20 millimeter before the port Oerlikon jammed after 40 rounds and the barrel could not be removed.

Having reported to Commander in Chief U.S. Fleet (ComInCh) and Commander Eastern Sea Frontier for shakedown and onwards routing on 2 December 1942, SC-1470 continued fitting out at Boston until 4 December, when she sailed four minutes into the forenoon watch in company with SC-1471 and SC-766, bound for Tompkinsville, Staten Island. Proceeding via the Cape Cod Canal, she reached New Bedford harbor later that afternoon, remaining there until the following morning, when she sailed for Port Jefferson harbor, reaching her destination at 18:00 and mooring alongside SC-766 at the ferry docks there. SC-1470 ultimately reached Tompkinsville shortly after mid-day on 6 December.

=== 1943 ===
After undergoing alterations at Tompkinsville through mid-January 1943, SC-1470 sailed on 21 January in accordance with Commander Eastern Sea Frontier orders to proceed to Miami, Florida, in company with SC-1471 and report to the commanding officer of the Submarine Chaser Training Center (SCTC). Upon completing her shakedown, SC-1470 was then to report to Commander Gulf Sea Frontier for onward routing to the Caribbean.

Pausing to fuel at the Naval Operating Base, Norfolk, Virginia, on 22 January 1943, SC-1470 and SC-1471 continued on, encountering heavy fog off Frying Pan Shoals late on the 24th. Lt. Parker ordered engines slowed to two-thirds speed, stationed a lookout in the eyes of the ship, and had the navigation lights turned on. Eventually, shortly before the start of the mid watch, the fog cleared enough for the ships to resume standard speed. Stopping again, at the Section Base at Charleston, late on 25 January, SC-1470 resumed her coastwise passage after a brief fog-induced delay the following morning. She fueled at the Section Base at Mayport, on the morning of the 27th, and stood into the swept channel at Miami at 16:10 on the 28th.

SC-1470 got underway for her shakedown on 3 February 1943, then conducted a night patrol encompassing an area from five miles east of the sea buoy that lay to the southwest, to five miles abeam of the Fowey Rocks Light. She stood in to moor at Pier 2, SCTC at 05:40 on the 4th. She then conducted her gunnery shakedown on the 7th, as well as ran various emergency drills. On the morning of 8 February, SC-1470 transferred her allowance of 16 Mousetrap projectiles ashore, the equipment removed and delivered to the SCTC. She then began a period of maintenance and minor repairs that continued until the 12th, after which time she shifted to a berth alongside the County Causeway. A brief interval underway on 15 February, with student officers and SCTC faculty on board, and formation steaming off Miami Beach in company with SC-1467, SC-1469 and her old running mate SC-1471, punctuated that availability period that continued into late February. As that month drew to a close, she “painted ship” on the 22nd, took on supplies, underwent an inspection on the 24th by Capt. Benson on the staff of the Commandant of the Seventh Naval District, and the following day by Cmdr. Olson, the Port Director at Miami. On the 26th, workmen removed the Marconi wireless gear that had equipped the ship when commissioned, replacing it with new equipment, a process concluded the following day.

==== Collision with PC-1123 ====
After undergoing alterations and taking on supplies (1-4 March 1943), SC-1470 stood out to sea on 5 March. At 22:37 that day, SC-1470 passed Molasses Reef Light abeam to starboard, 1.5 miles away. An hour later, she changed course in response to orders from the officer in tactical command, but at 23:54 sighted a ship on her starboard beam “heading toward us on a collision course.” SC-1470’s officer of the deck ordered “hard left rudder,” but the steel-hulled submarine chaser PC-1123, the approaching ship, plowed into the wooden-hulled vessel and rammed a hole in the starboard side of the engine room, the damage extending from the gunwale to below the waterline, flooding that compartment and putting all electrical circuits out of commission. PC-1123’s several attempts to come alongside and pass a towline only caused further damage -- to SC-1470’s port side above the waterline -- when the heavy seas pushed the ships together. Finally, shortly before the end of the mid watch on 6 March, PC-1123 managed to get a line to the damaged vessel and set course for Miami.

Passing the sea buoy at the mouth of the Miami River at 16:55 on 6 March 1943, SC-1470 cast off from PC-1123 five minutes later and hoisted “not under command” signals until a tug could arrive. A navy tug came alongside about two and a half hours later, taking the tow line at 1935, and turned the damaged ship over to the district tug YT-333 (ex-Daniel Ladd) at 20:30, the latter taking SC-1470 to the Dade Drydock Co. yard, where the submarine chaser immediately entered a floating drydock at 20:47. Yard workmen began repair work almost immediately, and installed a soft patch on the starboard side on the 7th. Workmen removed all ammunition, work continuing throughout the day, while Lt. Cone H. Johnson, USNR, the commanding officer, noted “several inspections by interested officials.” The following afternoon [8 March], SC-1470 was taken from the drydock by YT-333, and moored to the north side of Pier 2 at the SCTC. YT-333 took the vessel to a berth at the County Causeway, where all fuel was removed from the damaged ship, then back to Pier 2, where SC-1470 “awaited orders” for the remainder of March.

Those who inspected the ship at Miami deemed SC-1470 to require two months for repairs. Subsequently, ComInCh suggested on 19 May 1943 that “if [SC-1470 was] so badly damaged that she may be scratched from the Navy list or even be subject to long repairs” the ship be turned over to the Vice Chief of Naval Operations (VCNO). Her assignment to the Caribbean Sea Frontier cancelled by ComInCh, SC-1470 was accordingly turned over to the VCNO for further disposition by the Commander of the Operational Training Command, Atlantic, on 24 May 1943.

Redesignated as a “miscellaneous” type of vessel, of an “unclassified” nature, SC-1470 was named Panther and given the identification number IX-105 on 26 June 1943. She was assigned to the Seventh Naval District on 1 July 1943. Evaluated as unseaworthy, she was decommissioned at Miami on 9 July 1943 and her hulk delivered to the Head of the Seamanship Department at the SCTC the same day. Lt. Robert C. Colwell, her commanding officer, and Lt. (j.g.) Herbert W. Sadler, her executive officer, reported for temporary duty at the SCTC immediately thereafter. Panther was assigned to Service Squadron 1, Service Force, Atlantic Fleet, on 29 September 1943.

=== 1945 ===
The Secretary of the Navy, on 4 December 1945, deemed Panther “not essential to the defense of the U.S.” and authorized the Chief of Naval Operations to dispose of her. Placed out of service on 21 January 1946, the vessel was stricken from the Navy Register the same day, by that point deemed in “extreme condition” and the cost of repairs “excessive.”

Ex-Panther was sold for scrapping on 13 February 1947.
