= HMCS Preserver (1941) =

World War II depot ship

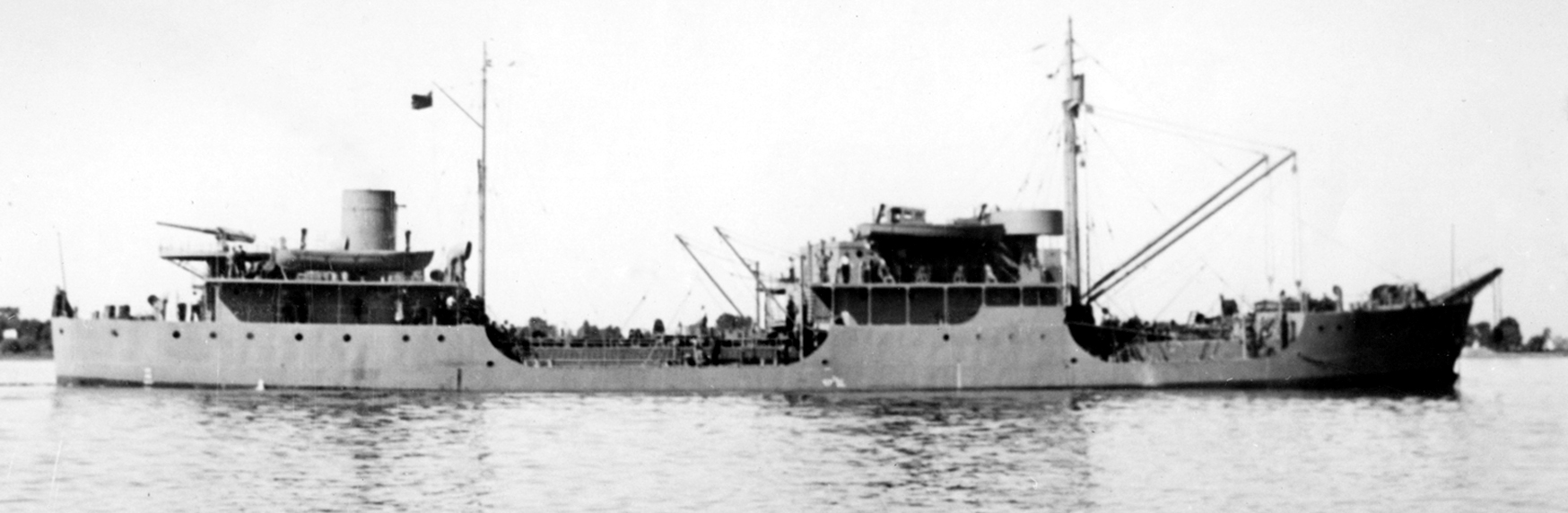
- HMCS Preserver

History

Canada
- Name: Preserver
- Builder: Marine Industries, Sorel, Quebec
- Yard number: 104
- Launched: 21 December 1941
- Commissioned: 11 July 1942
- Decommissioned: 6 November 1945
- Fate: Sold to Peruvian Navy 1947

Peru
- Name: Mariscal Castilla
- Acquired: 4 January 1946
- Renamed: Cabo Blanco 1951
- Stricken: 1960
- Fate: Sold for commercial service 1960

History
- Name: Cayo Blanco (1960–1962); Petronap (1962–1963)
- Owner: Agencia Nacional de Vapores Jose Poblete Vidal (1960–1962); Aninat & Bluhn (1962–1963)
- Port of registry: Panama
- Acquired: 1960
- In service: 1960
- Out of service: 1963
- Identification: IMO number: 6113994
- Fate: Caught fire and wrecked 20 April 1963

General characteristics
- Type: Motor launch depot ship
- Tonnage: 2,347 GRT; 3,455 DWT
- Displacement: 4,670 long tons (4,740 t)
- Length: 81.7 m (268 ft 1 in) oa; 78.0 m (255 ft 11 in) pp
- Beam: 13.4 m (44 ft 0 in)
- Draught: 5.4 m (17 ft 8 in)
- Propulsion: Diesel engines
- Speed: 9 knots (17 km/h; 10 mph)
- Range: 37,000 nmi (69,000 km; 43,000 mi) at 8 knots (15 km/h; 9.2 mph)
- Complement: 107
- Armament: 1 × 4 in (102 mm) naval gun; 2 × Oerlikon 20 mm cannon

HMCS Preserver was a depot ship of the Coastal Forces of the Royal Canadian Navy during World War II. Commissioned in July 1942, Preserver supported Canadian Fairmile B motor launches in Canadian and Newfoundland waters during the war.

The ship was sold to the Peruvian Navy in 1946 and renamed the vessel Mariscal Castilla. Used as a fleet supply ship, Mariscal Castilla was renamed Cabo Blanco in 1953. Past 1960, the sources diverge on the fate of the vessel, with most stating that Cabo Blanco was broken up for scrap, while one states the vessel was sold into commercial service. Renamed Cayo Blanco and then Petronap the vessel caught fire and wrecked at San Lorenzo Island near Callao on 20 April 1963.

== Description ==
Preserver was 81.7 m (268 ft 1 in) long overall and 78.0 m (255 ft 11 in) between perpendiculars with a beam of 13.4 m (44 ft 0 in) and a draught of 5.4 m (17 ft 8 in). The ship had a displacement of 4,670 long tons (4,740 t), a gross register tonnage (GRT) of 2,347 tons and a deadweight tonnage (DWT) of 3,455 tons. (Note: The sources disagree on the exact dimensions, though they are all roughly similar. Tucker has the overall length at 82.0 metres (268 ft 11 in) and the maximum draught at 5.5 metres (17 ft 11 in), while Macpherson & Barrie have the overall length at 81.8 metres (268 ft 5 in) and the beam at 13.4 metres (43 ft 11 in).) The vessel was powered by diesel engines turning two screws with a designed speed of 10 knots (19 km/h; 12 mph), but a maximum speed of 9 knots (17 km/h; 10 mph). The ship had a range of 37,000 nautical miles (69,000 km; 43,000 mi) at 8 knots (15 km/h; 9.2 mph).

The ship was either armed with one 4-inch (102 mm) naval gun and two 20-millimetre (0.79 in) Oerlikon cannon or one 76 mm (3 in) QF 12-pounder 12 cwt naval gun. The ship was designed to be a Fairmile B motor launch depot ship and was fitted with a machine shop, spare accommodations and extra fuel and store spaces. The vessel had a ship's company of 107, with 20 officers and 87 ratings.

== Service history ==
=== Canadian service ===
The vessel was constructed at the Marine Industries shipyard at Sorel, Quebec in 1941 and given the yard number 104. Preserver was launched on 21 December 1941 and completed in July 1942, ahead of sister ship Provider. The ship was commissioned on 11 July 1942 at Sorel and sailed for Halifax, Nova Scotia on 4 August, escorting a Quebec-Sydney convoy en route. The ship was then assigned to Newfoundland Force as a base ship for the Fairmile B motor launches operating there. The ship arrived at St. John's, Newfoundland on 18 September. During the period at St. John's, Preserver became a refuelling station for all naval vessels within harbour as the main refuelling tanks at St. John's had not finished construction. Preserver and a flotilla of Fairmiles were deployed to Botwood, Newfoundland. Botwood had been planned as a new Royal Canadian Navy base and Preserver and the Fairmiles were sent there to protect the transports unloading aviation fuel at Lewisporte that was destined for the airfield at Gander. Preserver and the Fairmiles returned to St. John's in mid-December 1942, sailing for Botwood again the following July. At the end of July 1943, Preserver and the Fairmiles relocated to Red Bay, returning to St. John's in November. Due to strategic changes in the Atlantic theatre, Botwood was abandoned as a base and Preserver and the Fairmiles became the only Royal Canadian Navy vessels ever to deploy there.

In mid-June 1944, Preserver and the Fairmiles returned to Red Bay. In September, they transferred to Sydney before Preserver sailed to Halifax for a refit. Upon returning to service, Preserver was sent to St. John's and then to Shelburne, Nova Scotia in June 1945. The ship was paid off on 6 November 1945 and sold to the Peruvian Navy on 4 January 1946.

=== Peruvian service and fate ===
The ship was re-designated a fleet supply ship and renamed Mariscal Castilla. The name commemorated the former president of Peru, Marshal Ramón Castilla. The ship was renamed Cabo Blanco in 1951 and continued in Peruvian service until March 1961. The sources diverge from here on the fate of the vessel. Macpherson & Barrie, Colledge & Warlow, and Blackman all state the vessel was broken up for scrap. The Miramar Ship Index states the vessel was sold into commercial service to Agencia Nacional de Vapores Jose Poblete Vidal in 1960 and renamed Cayo Blanco and registered in Panama. In 1962, the ship was sold again, this time to Aninat & Bluhn and renamed Petronap. On 20 April 1963, Petronap caught fire and wrecked on San Lorenzo Island near Callao, Peru.

== Sources ==
- Blackman, Raymond V. B., ed. (1961). Jane's Fighting Ships 1961–62. London: Sampson, Low & Marston. OCLC 973363518.
- Colledge, J. J. & Warlow, Ben (2006) [1969]. Ships of the Royal Navy: The Complete Record of all Fighting Ships of the Royal Navy (Revised ed.). London: Chatham Publishing. ISBN 978-1-86176-281-8. OCLC 67375475.
- Macpherson, Ken & Barrie, Ron (2002). The Ships of Canada's Naval Forces 1910–2002 (Third ed.). St. Catharines, Ontario: Vanwell Publishing. ISBN 1-55125-072-1.
- McMurtrie, Francis E., ed. (1948). Jane's Fighting Ships 1947–48. London: Sampson, Low & Marston. OCLC 927896834.
- "Preserver (6113994)". Miramar Ship Index.
- Tucker, Gilbert Norman (1952). The Naval Service of Canada, Its Official History – Volume 2: Activities on Shore During the Second World War. Ottawa: King's Printer. OCLC 4346983.
