= HMCS Provider (1942) =

Royal Canadian Navy WW2 depot ship

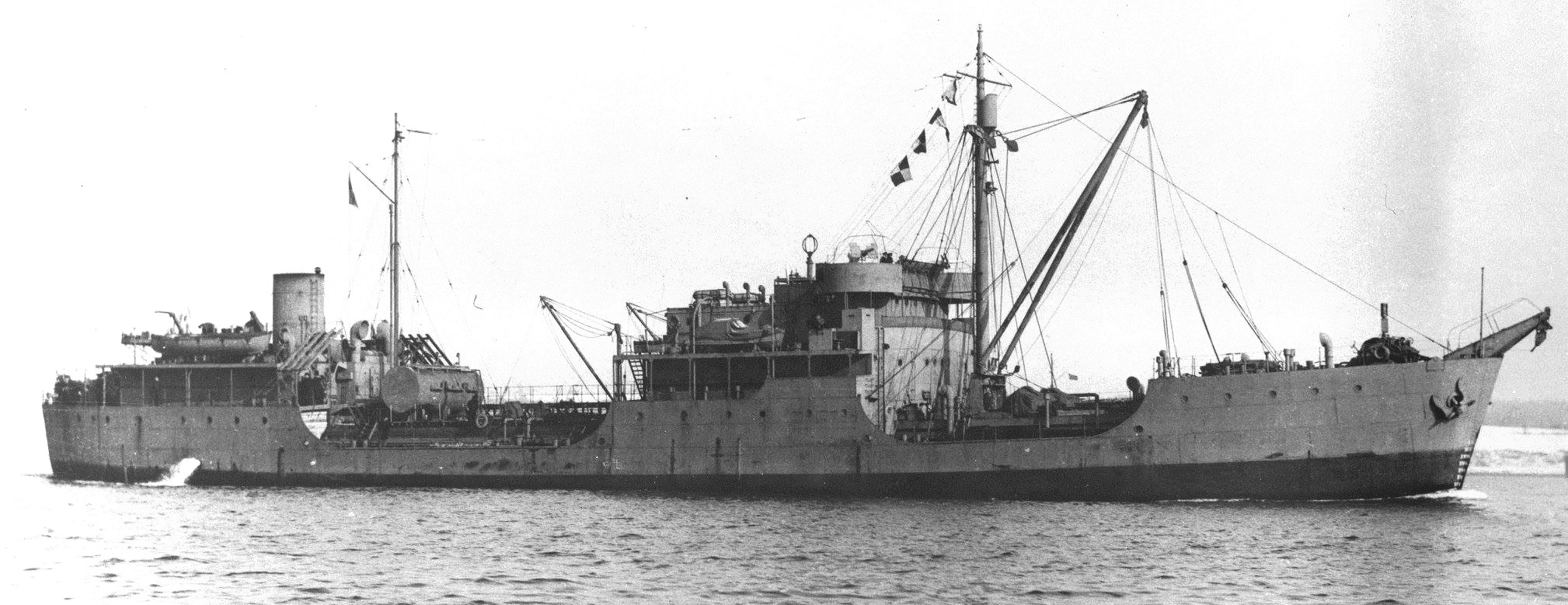
- HMCS Provider

History

Canada
- Name: Provider
- Builder: Marine Industries, Sorel, Quebec
- Yard number: 105
- Launched: December 1942
- Commissioned: 1 December 1942
- Decommissioned: 22 March 1946
- Fate: Sold into commercial service 1947

History
- Name: Maruba (1947–1956); Olaya (1956); Orgenos (1956–1960)
- Owner: Lunham & Moore (Tankers) Ltd (1947–1956); Empresa Petrolia Fiscal (1956–1960)
- Port of registry: (Canada) Montreal (1947–1956); (Peru) Callao (1956–1960)
- In service: 1947
- Out of service: 1960
- Identification: IMO number: 526067
- Fate: Acquired by Peruvian Navy

Peru
- Name: Orgenos
- Acquired: 1960
- Stricken: 1961
- Fate: Broken up for scrap 1961

General characteristics
- Type: Fairmile depot ship
- Tonnage: 2,367 GRT; 3,455 DWT
- Displacement: 4,670 long tons (4,740 t)
- Length: 81.7 m (268 ft 1 in) oa; 78.0 m (255 ft 11 in) pp
- Beam: 13.4 m (44 ft 0 in)
- Draught: 5.4 m (17 ft 8 in)
- Propulsion: Diesel engines
- Speed: 9 knots (17 km/h; 10 mph)
- Range: 37,000 nmi (69,000 km; 43,000 mi) at 8 knots (15 km/h; 9.2 mph)
- Complement: 107
- Armament: 1 × 4 in (102 mm) naval gun; 2 × 20 mm (0.79 in) cannon

HMCS Provider was a Fairmile depot ship constructed for the Royal Canadian Navy during World War II. Commissioned in December 1942, Provider served as a base ship in the Caribbean Sea, in Quebec and at Halifax, Nova Scotia. Following the war, the vessel was sold into commercial service and converted into a tanker in 1946. The ship re-entered service in 1947 and was renamed Maruba. The ship sailed under this name until 1956, when it was sold and renamed Olaya. Renamed Orgenos the same year, the tanker was acquired by the Peruvian Navy in 1960. In 1961, Orgenus was sold for scrap and broken up in Peru. The ship's registry was not deleted until 1992.

== Description ==
Provider was an 81.7 m (268 ft 1 in) long overall and 78.0 m (255 ft 11 in) between perpendiculars with a beam of 13.4 m (44 ft 0 in) and a draught of 5.4 m (17 ft 8 in). The ship had a displacement of 4,670 long tons (4,740 t), a gross register tonnage (GRT) of 2,367 tons and a deadweight tonnage (DWT) of 3,455 tons. (Note: The sources disagree on the exact dimensions, though they are all roughly similar. Tucker has the overall length at 82.0 metres (268 ft 11 in) and the maximum draught at 5.5 metres (17 ft 11 in), while Macpherson & Barrie have the overall length at 81.8 metres (268 ft 5 in) and the beam at 13.4 metres (43 ft 11 in).) The vessel was powered by diesel engines turning two screws with a designed speed of 10 knots (19 km/h; 12 mph), but a maximum speed of 9 knots (17 km/h; 10 mph). The ship had a range of 37,000 nautical miles (69,000 km; 43,000 mi) at 8 knots (15 km/h; 9.2 mph). The ship was either armed with one 4-inch (102 mm) naval gun and two 20-millimetre (0.79 in) cannon or one 12-pounder 3-inch (76 mm) naval gun. The ship was designed to be a Fairmile B motor launch depot ship and was fitted with a machine shop, spare accommodations and extra fuel and store spaces. The vessel had a ship's company of 107, with 20 officers and 87 ratings.

== Service history ==
The vessel was constructed at the Marine Industries shipyard at Sorel, Quebec, in 1941–1942 and given the yard number 105. The ship was launched in December 1942 and named Provider. Provider was commissioned on 1 December, the second vessel of its design to enter Canadian service after sister ship Preserver. Provider sailed for Halifax, Nova Scotia and was transferred to the Caribbean Sea with two flotillas of Fairmile motor launches. However, while en route, Provider was damaged in a storm and was forced to return to Halifax. Provider departed Halifax on 29 December and arrived at Trinidad on 20 February 1943. There, Provider and the flotillas alleviated the shortage of patrol forces in the region, with Provider acting as the base ship for the Fairmiles. Provider sailed for Guantánamo Bay, Cuba and was joined there by the 73rd Flotilla of Fairmile motor launches. The two units then moved on to Key West, Florida. Provider returned to Halifax on 23 April 1943.

Provider was then allocated to Gaspé Force, arriving at Gaspé, Quebec, on 23 April in the Gulf of St. Lawrence. The vessel was then sent further up the St. Lawrence River to Sept-Îles, Quebec, arriving on 29 June and remaining there until November. Provider then sailed for Halifax, before heading on to Bermuda to serve as base ship for the 70th and 78th Fairmile flotillas. The vessel returned to Halifax on 31 July 1944, before being attached to HMCS Somers Isles, the Canadian training base at Bermuda until the end of May 1945. The ship returned to Halifax to become the base supply ship before being paid off on 22 March 1946.

The ship was sold in 1946 to Lunham & Moore (Tankers) Ltd and converted into a tanker. Registered in Montreal, the vessel was renamed Maruba and re-entered service in 1947. Maruba was sold to Empresa Petrolera Fiscal in 1956, renamed Olaya and registered in Callao. The same year, the vessel was renamed Orgenos. In 1960, the Peruvian Navy acquired Orgenos but the vessel was taken out of service in 1961 and sold for scrap. Orgenos was broken up in Peru in 1961, but the vessel's registry was not deleted until 1992. (Note: The spelling of the ship's names in commercial service varies among the sources. Colledge & Warlow spell it as Maribu, the Miramar Ship Index spells it Organus and Blackman spells it as Organos.)

== Sources ==
- Blackman, Raymond V. B., ed. (1961). Jane's Fighting Ships 1961–62. London: Sampson, Low & Marston. OCLC 973363518.
- Colledge, J. J. & Warlow, Ben (2006) [1969]. Ships of the Royal Navy: The Complete Record of all Fighting Ships of the Royal Navy (Revised ed.). London: Chatham Publishing. ISBN 978-1-86176-281-8. OCLC 67375475.
- Macpherson, Ken & Barrie, Ron (2002). The Ships of Canada's Naval Forces 1910–2002 (Third ed.). St. Catharines, Ontario: Vanwell Publishing. ISBN 1-55125-072-1.
- "Provider (526067)". Miramar Ship Index.
- Tucker, Gilbert Norman (1952). The Naval Service of Canada, Its Official History – Volume 2: Activities on Shore During the Second World War. Ottawa: King's Printer. OCLC 4346983.
