= List of works by Terence Cuneo =

Terence Cuneo (1907–1996) was an English painter famous for his scenes of railways, horses, ceremonies, and military action.

== Ceremonial paintings ==
Year	Title	Image	Dimensions	Collection	Comments
1952	Visit of HRH The Duke of Edinburgh to the Department of Engineering, 13 November 1952 (c. 1952), oil on canvas	view	100 × 124 cm. (39.4 × 48.8 in.)	Department of Engineering, University of Cambridge, Cambridge	Scene: Duke of Edinburgh (1921–2021).
1953	The Coronation Luncheon of Her Majesty Queen Elizabeth in Guildhall, 12 June 1953, oil on canvas	view	166 × 214 cm. (65.4 × 84.3 in.)	Guildhall Art Gallery, City of London	Scene: Queen Elizabeth II (1926–2022); Duke of Edinburgh (1921–2021); Guildhall, City of London, 12 June 1953.
1954	The Coronation of Queen Elizabeth II	view		Buckingham Palace, City of Westminster	Scene: Queen Elizabeth II (1926–2022); Duke of Edinburgh (1921–2021); Westminster Abbey, City of Westminster, 12 June 1953. RCIN 404470
1957	The Departure of HM Queen Elizabeth II and HRH the Duke of Edinburgh from the Corporation Pier, Kingston upon Hull, for the State Visit to Denmark, oil on canvas	view	115 × 180 cm. (45.3 × 70.9 in.)	Hull Guildhall, Kingston upon Hull, East Riding of Yorkshire	Scene: Queen Elizabeth II (1926–2022); Duke of Edinburgh (1921–2021); Corporation Pier, Kingston upon Hull.
1958	Elizabeth II Visiting the Staff College, oil on canvas	view	128 × 99.5 cm. (50.4 × 39.2 in.)	Defence Academy of the United Kingdom, Shrivenham, Oxfordshire	Scene: Queen Elizabeth II (1926–2022). Artwork commissioned by Army Staff College.
1960	The Dedication to a Memorial of King Haakon VII of Norway, Colonel-in-Chief, in St Mary's Parish Church, Richmond, 1959, oil on canvas	view	101 × 85 cm. (39.8 × 33.5 in.)	Green Howards Regimental Museum, Richmond, North Yorkshire	Scene: Haakon VII of Norway (1872–1957); Richmond, North Yorkshire.
1961	Luncheon in the Guildhall, London, to Her Majesty the Queen and the Duke of Edinburgh, 10 March 1961, oil on canvas	view	198 × 258 cm. (78 × 101.6 in.)	Guildhall Art Gallery, City of London	Scene: Queen Elizabeth II (1926–2022); Duke of Edinburgh (1921–2021); Guildhall, City of London.
1961	Opening of the College by Her Majesty the Queen, July 1960, oil on canvas	view	182 × 243 cm. (71.7× 95.7 in.)	Royal College of Obstetricians and Gynaecologists	Scene: Queen Elizabeth II (1926–2022); opening ceremony of Royal College of Obstetricians and Gynaecologists, Sussex Place, Regent's Park, London.
1962	Council of the College, 1962, oil on canvas	view	144 × 215 cm. (56.7 × 84.6 in.)	Hunterian Museum, Royal College of Surgeons of England, Lincoln's Inn Fields, London	Artwork commissioned, 1962.
1965	Presentation of the Guidon by HM Queen Mother, 1965 (11th Hussars) (c. 1965)	view	100 x 140 cm. (39.4 x 55.1 in.)	HorsePower, King’s Royal Hussars Museum, Peninsula Barracks, Winchester, Hampshire	Scene: Queen Mother (1900–2002); 11th Hussars; Guidon.
1965	The Lying-in-State of Sir Winston Churchill, oil on canvas	view	101.6 × 127 cm. (40 × 50 in.)	Palace of Westminster, London	Scene: Winston Churchill (1874–1965), 29 January 1965; Westminster Hall, Palace of Westminster.
1966	Presentation of the Victoria Cross to the Reverend Theodore Bayley Hardy, VC, DSO, MC by HM King George V, oil on canvas	view	86 × 116 cm. (33.9 × 45.7 in.)	Museum of Army Chaplaincy, Amport House, near Andover, Hampshire	Scene: Theodore Hardy VC (1863–1918); George V (1865–1936).
1969	The Commonwealth Prime Ministers' Banquet at the Guildhall, 13 January 1969, oil on canvas	view	183 × 244 cm. (72 × 96 in.)	Guildhall Art Gallery, City of London	Scene: Queen Elizabeth II (1926–2022); Duke of Edinburgh (1921–2021).
1970	The Surrender of the Sword of State to HM Queen Elizabeth II on Her Arrival at Kingston upon Hull on 4 August 1969, oil on canvas	view	120 × 182 cm. (47.2 × 71.7 in.)	Hull Guildhall, Kingston upon Hull, East Riding of Yorkshire	Scene: Queen Elizabeth II (1926–2022); Kingston upon Hull, East Riding of Yorkshire.
1982	Elizabeth II Visiting on International Day, oil on canvas	view	89.2 × 120.8 cm. (35.1 × 40.5 in.)	Defence Academy of the United Kingdom, Shrivenham, Oxfordshire	Scene: Queen Elizabeth II (1926–2022).
	Trooping the Colour, oil on canvas	view	63.2 × 76.2 cm. (24.39 × 30 in.)		

== Portraits ==
Year	Title	Image	Dimensions	Collection	Comments
1949	Sir Henry Thirkill (Conversation Piece), oil on canvas	view	81.9 × 108.6 cm. (32.2 × 42.8 in.)	Clare College, University of Cambridge, Cambridge	Subject: administrators of Clare College; Sir Henry Thirkill (Master), with William John Harrison (Bursar) and William Telfer (Dean).
1952	Colonel and Mrs. Vere Cotton, oil on canvas	view	76.5 × 101.5 cm. (30.1 × 40 in.)	Walker Art Gallery, National Museums Liverpool, Liverpool, Merseyside	Subjects: Colonel Vere Egerton Cotton and his wife, Elfreda Moore.
1953	Coronation Study (c. 1953)	view view			Subject: Queen Elizabeth II (1926–2022). Artwork commissioned by the Queen's representatives, the Lord-Lieutenants of England, Scotland, Wales, and Northern Ireland. Portion of artwork used in 1953 Royal Mail Coronation stamp (view view).
1953	Portrait of Admiral of the Fleet Andrew Browne Cunningham, oil on canvas	view	76.2 × 63.5. cm. (30 × 25 in.)		Subject: Andrew Cunningham, 1st Viscount Cunningham of Hyndhope (1883–1963).
1956	Rick Pearson, Cow Puncher, Texas, oil on canvas	view	76 × 63.5 cm. (29.9 × 25 in.)		Scene: cow puncher; Texas, United States
1957	Sir Cuthbert and Lady Ackroyd and Their Family in the Mansion House, London, oil on canvas	view	80 × 109 cm. (31.5 × 42.9 in.)	Guildhall Art Gallery, City of London	Subject: Sir Cuthbert Lowell Ackroyd, 1st Baronet DL, JP (1892–1973), Lord Mayor of London, 1955–56; Joyce Wallace Whyte (m. 1927; daughter of Robert Whyte); Christopher Lovell Ackroyd (b. 1934); John Robert Whyte Ackroyd, 2nd Baronet (1932–1995); Jennifer Eileen McLeod Bishop (daughter of Henry George Stokes Bishop; wife of John Robert Whyte Ackroyd, m. 1956, d. 1997).
1962	Sir Lawrence Bragg Giving the 1961 Christmas Lectures in the Royal Institution Theatre, oil on canvas	view	120 × 172 cm. (47.3 × 67.7 in.)	The Royal Institution, London	Subject: Sir Lawrence Bragg (1890–1971), physicist, X-ray crystallographer, and Nobel Laureate (youngest, having received the award at the age of 25).
1966	The Reverend Ivan Delacrois Neil, oil on canvas	view	76 × 63.5 cm. (29.9 × 25 in.)	Museum of Army Chaplaincy, Amport House, Hampshire	Subject: The Reverend Ivan Delacrois Neil (1912–2001), OBE, Chaplain-General (1960–1966).
1971	Sir Edward Heath	view	123 × 99 cm. (48.4 × 39 in.)	Balliol College, University of Oxford, Oxford	Subject: Sir Edward Heath (1916–2005), KG, Organ Scholar (1935–1939), Honorary Fellow (1969), Prime Minister (1970–1974).
1972	Field Marshal Viscount Montgomery of Alamein, oil on canvas	view	125 × 100 cm. (49.2 × 39.4 in.)	Defence Academy of the United Kingdom, Shrivenham, Oxfordshire	Subject: Field Marshal Bernard Law Montgomery (1887–1976), 1st Viscount Montgomery of Alamein, GCB, DSO. Artwork commissioned by the Army Staff College, 1971.
1972	Self Portrait	see Cuneo Society website			
	Linda	see Cuneo Society website			Subject: the artist's daughter.
	Carole	see Cuneo Society website			Subject: the artist's daughter.
	Her Majesty The Queen with Her Dogs at Frogmore	see Cuneo Society website			Subject: Queen Elizabeth II (1926–2022).
	Sir Norman Jeffcoate, oil on canvas	view	100.5 × 74.8 cm. (39.6 × 29.4 in.)	Royal College of Obstetricians and Gynaecologists, London	Subject: Sir Norman Jeffcoate (1907–1992), President of the Royal College of Obstetricians and Gynaecologists (1969–1972).
	Deputy Marshall of Tombstone	see Terence Cuneo website			
	Simienesh Sirak, oil on canvas	view	62.9 × 51.4 cm. (24.8 × 20.2 in.)		

== Military paintings or illustrations ==
Year	Title	Image	Dimensions	Collection	Comments
1939-1945	Invasion Scene (originally may have been untitled), oil on canvas	view	61 × 76 cm. (24 × 29.9 in.)	The National Archives, Kew, Richmond, UK	Scene: troop-carrying Airspeed Horsa aircraft land in field amidst tank battle. Artwork created for Ministry of Information during Second World War. INF3/19
1939-1945	Coastal Battery Scene (originally may have been untitled; or Back Them Up!), oil on board	view	70.1 × 53.4 cm. (27.6 × 21.0 in.)	The National Archives, Kew, Richmond, UK	Artwork created for Ministry of Information during Second World War. INF 3/21
1939-1945	Invasion Scene in Far East) (originally may have been untitled), oil and mixed media on board	view	46.8 x 60.7 cm. (18.4 x 23.9 in.)	The National Archives, Kew, Richmond, UK	Artwork created for Ministry of Information during Second World War. INF 3/28
1939-1945	Aircraft Attack British Battleship (originally may have been untitled), oil on board	view	64.4 × 49.2 cm. (25.4 × 19.4 in.)	The National Archives, Kew, Richmond, UK	Artwork created for Ministry of Information during Second World War. INF 3/45
1939-1945	Publicity for Latin America: Assault (5 scenes untitled), black carbon ink and black fabricated chalk drawings with white gouache highlights and masking			The National Archives, Kew, Richmond, UK	Scene: Royal Indian Navy and British Troops co-operating. INF 3/1472
1939-1945	Publicity for Latin America: In Peace and War (4 scenes untitled), black carbon ink and black fabricated chalk drawings with white gouache			The National Archives, Kew, Richmond, UK	Scene: yachts and motor torpedo boats. INF 3/1479
1939-1945	Under Nazi Rule: Resistance Movement Series (individual scenes untitled), charcoal and gouache on paper	view		The National Archives, Kew, Richmond, UK	Scene: man and woman in cellar listening to radio, likely coded messages. INF 3/1787
1939-1945	Under Nazi Rule: Resistance Movement Series (individual scenes untitled), fabricated black chalk/charcoal and white gouache			The National Archives, Kew, Richmond, UK	Scene: gang clearing wrecked train from railway line. INF 3/1788
1939-1945	Under Nazi Rule: Resistance Movement Series (individual scenes untitled), fabricated black chalk/charcoal and white gouache			The National Archives, Kew, Richmond, UK	Scene: priest preaching in damaged church. INF 3/1789
1939-1945	Under Nazi Rule: Resistance Movement Series (individual scenes untitled), fabricated black chalk/charcoal and white gouache			The National Archives, Kew, Richmond, UK	Scene: wounded man attended by Dutch family. INF 3/1790
1939-1945	Under Nazi Rule: Resistance Movement Series (individual scenes untitled), fabricated black chalk/charcoal and white gouache			The National Archives, Kew, Richmond, UK	Scene: German firing squad and Resistance man. INF 3/1791
1939-1945	Under Nazi Rule: Resistance Movement Series (individual scenes untitled), fabricated black chalk/charcoal and white gouache			The National Archives, Kew, Richmond, UK	Scene: inside French bakery. INF 3/1792
1939-1945	Under Nazi Rule: Resistance Movement Series (individual scenes untitled), fabricated black chalk/charcoal and white gouache			The National Archives, Kew, Richmond, UK	Scene: scene in dockside office. INF 3/1793
1939-1945	Under Nazi Rule: Resistance Movement Series (individual scenes untitled), fabricated black chalk/charcoal and white gouache			The National Archives, Kew, Richmond, UK	Scene: civilian men being herded into railway carriage by German soldiers. INF 3/1794
1939-1945	Under Nazi Rule: Resistance Movement Series (individual scenes untitled), fabricated black chalk/charcoal and white gouache			The National Archives, Kew, Richmond, UK	Scene: parachutist dropping at night amongst windmills. INF 3/1795
1939-1945	Under Nazi Rule: Resistance Movement Series (individual scenes untitled), fabricated black chalk/charcoal and white gouache			The National Archives, Kew, Richmond, UK	Scene: 2 Resistance fighters watching railway engine guarded by soldier. INF 3/1796
1939-1945	Under Nazi Rule: Resistance Movement Series (individual scenes untitled), fabricated black chalk/charcoal and white gouache			The National Archives, Kew, Richmond, UK	Scene: German soldiers approaching pedlar/peddler. INF 3/1797
1939-1945	Under Nazi Rule: Resistance Movement Series (individual scenes untitled), fabricated black chalk/charcoal and white gouache			The National Archives, Kew, Richmond, UK	Scene: man and whip. INF 3/1798
1939-1945	Under Nazi Rule: Resistance Movement Series (individual scenes untitled), fabricated black chalk/charcoal and white gouache			The National Archives, Kew, Richmond, UK	Scene: arm and dagger and German sentry. INF 3/1799
1939-1945	Under Nazi Rule: Resistance Movement Series (individual scenes untitled), charcoal on board	view		The National Archives, Kew, Richmond, UK	Scene: distressed male figure in prison uniform sitting in corner of cell. INF 3/1800
1939-1945	Under Nazi Rule: Resistance Movement Series (individual scenes untitled), fabricated black chalk/charcoal and white gouache			The National Archives, Kew, Richmond, UK	Scene: crowd advancing, bearing banners - massed formation of aircraft overhead. INF 3/1801
1939-1945	Under Nazi Rule: Resistance Movement Series (individual scenes untitled), fabricated black chalk/charcoal and white gouache			The National Archives, Kew, Richmond, UK	Scene: preacher in pulpit. INF 3/1802
1939-1945	Under Nazi Rule: Resistance Movement Series (individual scenes untitled), charcoal and gouache on paper	view		The National Archives, Kew, Richmond, UK	Scene: Allied soldiers at a Resistance headquarters. INF 3/1803
1939-1945	Under Nazi Rule: Resistance Movement Series (individual scenes untitled), fabricated black chalk/charcoal and white gouache			The National Archives, Kew, Richmond, UK	Scene: explosion at a fuel depot. INF 3/1804
1939-1945	Under Nazi Rule: Resistance Movement Series (individual scenes untitled), fabricated black chalk/charcoal and white gouache			The National Archives, Kew, Richmond, UK	Scene: British Manchester bomber aircraft dropping leaflets. INF 3/1805
1939-1945	Under Nazi Rule: Resistance Movement Series (individual scenes untitled), fabricated black chalk/charcoal and white gouache			The National Archives, Kew, Richmond, UK	Scene: Resistance fighters over-running German post in French town. INF 3/1806
1939-1945	Under Nazi Rule: Resistance Movement Series (individual scenes untitled), fabricated black chalk/charcoal and white gouache			The National Archives, Kew, Richmond, UK	Scene: explosion at bridge bearing train. INF 3/1807
1940	British Warship of Drake's Day (c. 1940), watercolor and gouache on board	view	30 × 23.5 cm. (11.8 × 9.3 in.)		
1941	Tank Repairs, oil on canvas	view	50 × 60 cm. (19.7 × 23.6 in.)		
1942	Assassination of Heydrich (c. 1942; originally may have been untitled), oil on canvas on board	view	61.4 × 76.1 cm. (24.2 × 30 in.)	The National Archives, Kew, Richmond, UK	Subject: SS-General Reinhard Heydrich (1904–1942; Operation Anthropoid). Artwork created for Ministry of Information during Second World War. INF 3/24
1943	Second Lieutenant W. Andrews, charcoal and gouache on paper	view		The National Archives, Kew, Richmond, UK	Scene: Wallace Andrews attempting to defuse an unexploded bomb. (illustration for GC Book Publishers) INF3/483
1943	Chief Officer G.P. Stronach, charcoal and gouache on paper	view		The National Archives, Kew, Richmond, UK	Scene: George Stronach rescuing man from debris on ship's deck. (illustration for GC Book Publishers) INF 3/484
1943	Captain D. W. M. Mason, charcoal and gouache on paper	view		The National Archives, Kew, Richmond, UK	Scene: Dudley Mason; Malta Convoys; fore-end of merchant ship SS Ohio under air attack. (illustration for GC Book Publishers) INF 3/485
1943	Mr. A. E. Dolphin, charcoal and gouache on board	view		The National Archives, Kew, Richmond, UK	Scene: Albert Dolphin attempting to rescue nurse - wall collapsing. (illustration for GC Book Publishers) INF 3/477
1944	Production of Tanks (original may have been untitled), oil on canvas	view	51.3 × 61.5 cm. (20.2 × 24.2 in.)	The National Archives, Kew, Richmond, UK	Scene: workers manufacture Churchill tanks on a factory production line. Artwork created for Ministry of Information during Second World War. INF 3/17
1944	Tank Battle (original may have been untitled), oil and pencil on board	view	50.8 ×71.2 cm. (20 × 28 in.)	The National Archives, Kew, Richmond, UK	Artwork created for Ministry of Information during Second World War. INF 3/18
1944	Bristol Beaufighter Being Armed with a Torpedo, oil on canvas	view	60 × 75 cm. (23.6 × 29.5 in.)	Royal Air Force Museum	Scene: Bristol Beaufighter.
1944	Warwick Air and Sea Rescue, oil on canvas	view	61 × 51 cm. (24 × 20.1 in.)		Scene: Vickers Warwick.
1945	In the Butts: Testing a Parnall Turret, oil on canvas	view	55 × 65 cm. (21.7 × 25.6 in.)	Royal Air Force Museum	Scene: armament testing at Parnall.
1948	Radar, oil on canvasboard	work	35.5 × 50 cm. (14 × 19.7 in.)		Scene: radar installation.
1950	The Royal Engineers Clearing the Mine Fields at the Start of the Battle of El Alamein, 23 October 1942 (or Breaching the Mine Fields), oil on canvas/acrylic on canvas	view view	87 × 108 cm. (34.3 × 42.5 in.)	Defence Academy of the United Kingdom, Shrivenham, Oxfordshire	Scene: Royal Engineers; Second Battle of El Alamein, 23 October 1942; Second World War.
1952	Servicing the Vampire, oil on canvas	view	76 × 63 cm. (29.9 × 24.8 in.)	de Havilland Aircraft Heritage Centre, London Colney, Hertfordshire	Scene: refueling de Havilland Vampire.
1958	Lieutenant John Cridlan Barrett, VC, 1/5th Battalion, Leicestershire Regiment during the Attack on Machine Guns in Forgan's Trench, 24 September 1918, oil on canvas	view	135 × 160 cm. (53.1 × 63 in.)	Royal Leicestershire Regiment Museum, Newarke Houses Museum, Leicester	Scene: Lieutenant John Cridlan Barrett VC (1897–1977); Leicestershire Regiment fighting near Pontruet, France, First World War, 24 September 1918. Artwork commissioned by the Regiment in 1958.
1960	Port to Port (c. 1960), oil on canvas	view	108.6 × 134.2 cm. (42.8 × 52.8 in.)	National Railway Museum, York, North Yorkshire	Scene: wheelhouse at sea.
1961	The Launch of HMS Dreadnought, oil on canvas	view	88 × 136.5 cm. (34.6 × 53.7 in.)	Royal Navy Submarine Museum, Gosport, Hampshire	Scene: HMS Dreadnought (S101), United Kingdom's first nuclear-powered submarine; Queen Elizabeth II (1926–2022); Barrow Shipyard; Trafalgar Day, 1960.
1961	German Paratroops Landing on Top of the 2nd Battalion, The Leicestershire Regiment in Crete, 20 May 1941, oil on canvas	view	150 × 196 cm. (59.1 × 77.2 in.)	Royal Leicestershire Regiment Museum, Newarke Houses Museum, Leicester	Scene: Leicestershire Regiment fighting at Crete, 20 May 1941; Second World War. Artwork commissioned by the Regiment, 1959.
1961	2nd Battalion the Leicestershire Regiment, as Chindits, during Operations against the Japanese at Indaw Lake, Burma, 1944, oil on canvas	view	148 × 196 cm. (58.3 × 77.2 in.)	Royal Leicestershire Regiment Museum, Newarke Houses Museum, Leicester	Scene: Leicestershire Regiment fighting at Indaw Lake, Burma, 1944; Second World War. Artwork commissioned by the Regiment, 1959.
1962	Lance Sergeant Philip Smith Winning The Leicestershire Regiment's First Victoria Cross for Bringing in Wounded Comrades at the Great Redan, Sevastopol, 18 June 1855 (c. 1962), oil on canvas	view	82 x 95.5 cm. (32.2 x 37.6 in.)	Royal Leicestershire Regiment Museum, Newarke Houses Museum, Leicester	Scene: Lance Sergeant Philip Smith VC (1825–1906); 17th (Leicestershire) Regiment of Foot; Sevastopol, Crimean War, 18 June 1855. Artwork commissioned by the Regiment in 1962.
1964	The Chestnut Troop (c. 1964)	view			Scene: A Battery (Chestnut Troop) Royal Horse Artillery exercises in Germany, October 1964; Ferret scout car; forward observer Centurion tank; 155 mm Howitzer battery.
1964	The 2nd Battalion 6th Gurkha Rifles and 14th/20th King's Hussars Fighting for the Town of Medicina, Italy, 16 April 1945, oil on canvas	view		Gurkha Museum, Peninsula Barracks, Winchester, Hampshire	Scene: 6th Gurkha Rifles; 14th/20th King's Hussars; Medicina, Italy; Second World War, 16 April 1945.
1966	'B' Company 1st Battalion Action against Indonesian Parachutists at Labis, 23 September 1964 (also The Action at Labis), oil on canvas	view view	100 × 125 cm. (39.4 × 49.2 in.)	Gurkha Museum, Peninsula Barracks, Winchester, Hampshire	Scene:10th Princess Mary's Own Gurkha Rifles; Labis, Segamat District, Johor, Malaysia; Malayan Emergency, 23 September 1964.
1966	Lance Corporal Rambahadur Limbu winning the Victoria Cross, Sarawak, 21 November 1965, oil on canvas	view		Sir John Moore Barracks, Shorncliffe Camp, Cheriton, Kent	Scene: Rambahadur Limbu VC; Battle of Bau, 21 November 1965; Sarawak, Malaysia.
1968	Temple Cliffs, Aden, Yemen, 20 June 1967, oil on canvas	view	101.5 × 136 cm. (40 × 53.6 in.)	Fusiliers Museum of Northumberland, Abbot's Tower, Alnwick Castle, Alnwick, Northumberland	Scene: Royal Northumberland Fusiliers; Aden, Yemen; North Yemen Civil War.
1970	Glider Assault, D-Day (c. 1970), oil on canvas	view	60 x 75 cm (23.6 x 29.5 in.)	Royal Air Force Museum	
1971	Leeson Street Patrol (c. 1970), acrylic on canvas	view view view			Scene: members of R Company of the Royal Green Jackets in action during their 4-month operations in Northern Ireland in September 1971.
1972	Changing the Guard at Buckingham Palace, oil on canvas	view		Sir John Moore Barracks, Shorncliffe Camp, Cheriton, Kent	Scene: Changing the Queen's Life Guard, Buckingham Palace.
1973	Ceremony of the Keys, acrylic on canvas	view view		Sir John Moore Barracks, Shorncliffe Camp, Cheriton, Kent	Scene: ceremonial locking of the Tower of London; custodian of Queen's keys, chief Yeoman Warder, is challenged by sentry on duty (member of Gurkha Regiment at time of painting).
1976	The Tragedy of Ulster 1976, oil on canvas	view view	90.2 × 151.1 cm. (35.5 × 59.5 in.)	Army and Navy Club, London	Scene: street violence in Ulster, Northern Ireland.
1977	The Tragedy of Ulster 1976, acrylic on canvas	view			Scene: street violence in Ulster, Northern Ireland.
1978	First Air Post (or First Air Mail), oil on canvas	view view			
1980	Tebourba Gap, oil on canvas	view	98 × 135 cm. (38.6 × 53.1 in.)	Royal Hampshire Regiment Museum, Serle's House, Winchester, Hampshire	Scene: Major H. W. Le Patourel VC (1916–1979); Hampshire Regiment; Tebourba Gap, Tunisia, 1942; Second World War. Artwork commissioned by the regiment.
1981	The Last Halifax, oil on canvas	view	131 × 152 cm. (51.5 × 59.8 in.)	Royal Air Force Museum	Scene: Handley Page Halifax.
1981	Sari Bair - 1st Battalion 6th Gurkha Rifles led by Major C. J. L. Allanson attacking the Turks on the crest of Sari Bair ridge, Gallipoli, 9th August 1916, oil on canvas	view		Gurkha Museum, Peninsula Barracks, Winchester, Hampshire	Scene: C. J. L. Allanson; 6th Gurkha Rifles; Battle of Sari Bair, Gallipoli, First World War, 9 August 1916.
1982	The Battle of Kohima, April 1944, oil on canvas	view	100 × 123 cm. (39.4 × 48.4 in.)	Kohima Museum, Imphal Barracks, York, North Yorkshire	Scene: Battle of Kohima, India, April 1944; Second World War.
1982	Lull in the Battle (c. 1982)	view			Scene: 3rd Battalion, Parachute Regiment with the Army Catering Corps at Port San Carlos, Falkland Islands, Falklands War, May 1982.
1982	Battle of Tumbledown Mountain (c. 1982)	view			Scene: 2nd Battalion Scots Guards capturing one of the most strongly defended Argentine positions of Falklands campaign, 14 June 1982.
1984	D-Day, 6th June 1944, oil on canvas	view	106.5 × 183 cm. (41.9 × 72 in.)		
1985	The Raising of the Green Howards (or Raising the Regiment), acrylic on canvas (c. 1985)	view view			Scene: raising of the Green Howards by Colonel Francis Luttrell at Dunster Castle, Somerset, 16 November 1688.
1989	The Crossing of the Indaw Chaung, Burma, 1944, oil on canvas	view	75 × 100 cm. (29.5 × 39.4 in.)	Wardown Park Museum, Bedfordshire and Hertfordshire Regiment Association Museum Collection, Luton, Bedfordshire	Scene: Burma Campaign, 1944; near Indaw, Katha District, Burma; Second World War.
1990	The Battle of Monte Cassino, Italy, 1944, oil on canvas	view	75 × 100 cm. (29.5 × 39.4 in.)	Wardown Park Museum, Bedfordshire and Hertfordshire Regiment Association Museum Collection, Luton, Bedfordshire	Scene: Battle of Monte Cassino; Monte Cassino, near Cassino, Italy; Second World War.
1990	Sustaining Forward (c. 1990)	view			Scene: field kitchen located on the Saudi Arabia/Iraq border, serving meals to the troops of the 7th Armoured Brigade (Desert Rats) before they moved to their pre-attack positions; Catering Support Regiment, Gulf War.
1991	Army Challenger - Operation Desert Storm 1991 Gulf War (c. 1991; or Tanks in the Gulf, July 1991), oil on canvas	view view		Army and Navy Club, London	Scene: 1st Armoured Division making advance, Objective COBALT; Gulf War, 1991.
	Paras Have Landed (or The Paras Are Landing)	view see Cuneo Society website			Scene: paratroopers landing.
	The Defence of Calais 1940	view view			Scene: members of 1st Battalion rifle brigade in defence of Calais; they held off repeated attacks of German tanks and infantry for 4 days.
	Road to Basra, acrylic on canvas	view			Scene: tanks near Basra, Iraq.
	Air Drop	see Terence Cuneo website			
	Surrender	see Terence Cuneo website			
	Baskeyfield (or Lance Sergeant J D Baskeyfield VC), oil on canvas	view		Staffordshire Regiment Museum, Staffordshire	Subject: Lance Sergeant John "Jack" Daniel Baskeyfield VC.
	Raising the Regiment - The King's Own Scottish Borderers. March 1689	view			Scene: raising the regiment (originally the 25th Foot) in Edinburgh on 18 March 1689 by David Leslie, 3rd Earl of Leven (1660–1728), for the defence of the city against the Jacobites during the Glorious Revolution that brought William of Orange (1650–1702) to England.
	Battle of Hyderabad, 24th March 1843	view			Scene: Royal Horse Artillery 1st Troop under the command of Major Leslie galloping across front of infantry—Cheshire Regiment—to bring guns into action closer to enemy during Battle of Hyderabad.
	Ambush at Sannas Post	view			Scene: 4 VCs were awarded to Q battery for getting their guns into action against 1,000 Boers concealed behind a ridge, near Bloemfontein in 1900 (during Second Boer War).
	Saving the Guns at Le Cateau, oil on canvas	view			Scene: Captain Reynold and drivers Luke and Drain saving the guns of 37th Battery from advancing German Infantry during Battle of Le Cateau, 26 August 1914; all 3 were awarded VC.
	Last Stand of the 5th (Gibraltar) Battery	view			Scene: 26–27 May 1918, 5th Battery's gun position was overrun by German Infantry; Battery Commander and 2 subalterns rallied surviving men and with Lewis Gun and rifles attempted to beat off the attack; only 4 gunners survived.
	The Battle of Knightsbridge, 6th June 1942	view			Scene: 8th Army battles against Rommel's Afrika Korps in western desert over 3-day period; artwork depicts 426th Battery of 107th Regiment Royal Horse Artillery (South Nottinghamshire Hussars) as tanks of Afrika Korps attack.
	The Kidney Ridge Action	view			Scene: members of 2nd Battalion rifle brigade and 239 Battery RA knocking out at least 32 enemy tanks during desert campaign on 27 October 1942; Lieutenant VB Turner was awarded the VC for this action.
	The Battle of Medenine, 6th march 1943	view			Scene: anti-tank guns of the left flank company 2nd Battalion Scots Guards during Battle of Medenine, Tunisia; Lt F A L Waldron's platoon knocks out s German tanks as they came over crest of ridge.
	Captain The Lord Lyell VC	view			Scene: action near Djebel Bou Aoukaz, Tunisia, 27 April 1943; Lyell (1913–1943) charging German 88 mm gun position single handed; 5 men fell at his feet, before he was overpowered .
	S Company Scots Guards in the Battle of Monte Piccolo, Italy 28th May 1944	view			Scene: S Company Scots Guards along with 3 Company Coldstream Guards, after heavy fighting, captures hill from German 1st parachute regiment.
	Scots Guards Fighting Through the Bocage	view			Scene: action of the right flank, 3rd Battalion Scots Guards during the advance from Caumont to Les Loges, Normandy, 30 July 1944; commanding the Churchill tank "Lochinvar" is Lt Robert Runcie (1921–2000), later to serve as Archbishop of Canterbury (1980–91).
	Sword Beach	view			Scene: Pioneers were among first British troops to land on beaches of Normandy on D-Day, by 1 August 1944 there were over 35,500 Pioneers in Normandy; artwork depicts various activities of Pioneers during D-Day landings.
	The Battle of Monte Cassino	view			Scene: 8th Army artillery firing during last Battle of Monte Cassino; 600 guns destroyed the remaining German defences; Second World War.
	The German Surrender at Luneberg Heath, May 1945	view			Scene: German surrender at Lüneberg Heath, Lower Saxony, Germany ending Second World War.
	The Sunger Sekayan Action in Borneo	view			Scene: patrol of 2nd Green Jackets (King's Royal Rifle Corps) 14 platoon under Lt. Michael Robertson successfully ambush 30 Indonesian regulars; artwork depicts Sgt. Hunt carrying Rfn. Martin with platoon giving supporting fire.
	The Price of Freedom	view			Scene: embodiment of spirit of entire British Army.
	The de Havilland Field Service, oil on canvas	view	77 × 51 cm. (30.3 × 20.1 in.)		Scene: support services for de Havilland aircraft.
	Sir Gustave Gorganzola at the Siege of the Granaries, oil on canvas		30 × 25 cm. (11.8 × 9.8 in.)		
	Soldiers Re-loading, oil on board	view	50.8 × 50.2 cm. (20 × 19.8 in.)		
	Bird's Eye View	view	46.7 × 61.9 cm. (18.4 × 24.4 in.)		Scene: view from cockpit.
	The Horse Guards at Hyde Park Corner, oil		62 × 74.5 cm. (24.4 × 29.3 in.)		Scene: Horse Guards; Hyde Park Corner.
	Polythene, oil on canvasboard		35.5 × 50 cm. (14 × 19.7 in.)		Scene: radar operator at work.
	The Hook Action, acrylic on canvas	view			Scene: Battle of the Hook, Korean War.
	The Freedom of the City of Nottingham, acrylic on canvas	view			Scene: Nottingham.
	The Battle of Killiecrankie, acrylic on canvas	view			

== Railway paintings ==
Year	Title	Image	Dimensions	Collection	Comments
1940	Essex, LNER (or Essex by Rail) (c. 1940)	view view			Scene: London and North Eastern Railway in Essex. British Railways poster artwork.
1946	The Day Begins, oil on canvas	view	88.5 × 127 cm. (34.8 × 50 in.)	National Railway Museum, York, North Yorkshire	Scene: London, Midland and Scottish Railway rolling stock. British Railways poster artwork.
1946	Royal Border Bridge (c. 1946)	view view			Scene: rolling stock crossing Royal Border Bridge, River Tweed, Northumberland. British Railways poster artwork.
1947	First Days of Steam, oil on canvas	view	77 × 89.9 cm. (30.3 × 35.4 in.)	National Railway Museum, York, North Yorkshire	
1947	Giants Refreshed: Pacifics in the Doncaster Locomotive Works, oil on canvas	view view	78 × 122 cm. (30.7 × 48 in.)	Doncaster Museum and Art Gallery, Doncaster, South Yorkshire	Scene: maintenance on London and North Eastern Railway rolling stock—Class A4 No.4500 Sir Ronald Matthews and Class A2/3 No.520 Owen Tudor—at Doncaster Works. Artwork commissioned by London and North Eastern Railway in 1947 for poster artwork.
1948	On Early Shift	view view	101.6 × 127 cm. (40 × 50 in.)		Scene: Greenwood signal box, New Barnet railway station, London. British Railways poster artwork.
1948	Red Crane and Train at Building Site, oil on canvas	view	76.2 × 64.1 cm. (30 × 25.2 in.)		
1949	An Engine is Wheeled	view			British Railways poster artwork.
1949	Clear Road Ahead, Monmouth Castle	view view			Scene: Great Western Railway rolling stock—Castle class No.5037 Monmouth Castle—in transit with clear track ahead. British Railways poster artwork.
1949	The Opening of the Stockton and Darlington Railway, 1825	view	69.6 × 85.5 cm. (27.4 × 33.7 in.)	National Railway Museum, York, North Yorkshire	Scene: Stockton and Darlington Railway rolling stock.
1950	Veteran Crossing a French Railway, (c 1950), oil on canvas	visit	61 × 75 cm. (20 × 29.5 in.)	Coventry Transport Museum, Coventry, West Midlands	Scene: close call at railway crossing.
1950	Tay Bridge, (c. 1950)	view			Scene: rolling stock on Tay Rail Bridge, Firth of Tay, Scotland. British Railways poster artwork.
1950	Glen Ogle, Perthshire (c. 1950)	view	101 × 63 in. (39.8 × 24.8 in.)		Scene: Glen Ogle, Perthshire, Scotland. British Railways poster artwork.
1952	Bon Voyage: Trains Joining Steam Ships at Calais, oil on canvas	view	92 × 133.6 cm. (36.2 × 52.6 in.)	National Railway Museum, York, North Yorkshire	Scene: Calais, France. British Railways poster artwork.
1952	Forging Ahead: The First British Railways Standard Express Locomotive, oil on canvas	view	96 x 133.5 cm. (37.8 x 52.6 in.)	National Railway Museum, York, North Yorkshire	British Railways poster artwork.
1952	Scotland for Your Holidays (c. 1952; or The Forth Railway Bridge)	view view			Scene: London and North Eastern Railway rolling stock—Gresley A4 class Pacific Plover—crossing Forth Bridge. British Railways poster artwork.
1955	The Highlands, Monessie Gorge (c. 1955)	view			Scene: West Highland Line, Monessie Gorge, Scottish Highlands. British Railways poster artwork.
1955	Track Laying by Night (c. 1955)	view			Scene: laying down permanent way on night shift using mechanised equipment; Wandsworth Common railway station, London. British Railways poster artwork.
1957	Talyllyn Railway on the Dolgoch Viaduct (or Tal-Y-Llyn Railway on the Dolgoch Viaduct), oil on canvas	view	64 × 76 cm (25.2 × 29.9 in.)	Russell-Cotes Art Gallery and Museum, Bournemouth, Dorset	Scene: Talyllyn Railway rolling stock on Dolgoch viaduct near Dolgoch railway station, Mid Wales.
1957	Progress, oil on canvas	view	86 × 130.2 cm. (33.9 × 51.3 in.)	National Railway Museum, York, North Yorkshire	British Railways poster artwork.
1959	DMU at Derby Carriage and Wagon Works, oil painting			Derby Museum of Making (2025‒)	Discovered during preparation for the Greatest Gathering at Derby Litchurch Lane Works; subsequently put on display. Scene: British Rail Class 108 DMU on Litchurch Lane traverser.
1959	Night Freight (1959), oil on canvas	view view			BR (M) poster artwork to promote the new Condor overnight container freight service.
1960	Nord 2–3–0 at SNCF (French National Railways) Boulogne Shed (c. 1960), oil on canvas	view	77.5 × 90.3 cm. (30.5 × 35.6 in.)	National Railway Museum, York, North Yorkshire	Scene: SNCF rolling stock—Nord class—at Boulogne rail yard.
1961	Clapham Junction, oil on canvas	view	105.6 × 120.7 cm. (41.6 × 47.5 in.)	National Railway Museum, York, North Yorkshire	Scene: Clapham Junction railway station, London Borough of Wandsworth. British Railways poster artwork.
1961	Trains in the Yard, oil on canvas	view	63.5 × 76.2 cm. (25 × 30 in.)		Scene: rolling stock in rail yard.
1961	Le Dernier des Géants, oil on canvas	view	83.7 × 122 cm. (33 × 48 in.)		
1962	South Grid Railway Sidings, oil on canvas	view	105.4 × 130.9 cm. (41.5 × 51.5 in.)	National Railway Museum, York, North Yorkshire	British Railways poster artwork for "Service to Industry" series.
1962	Signal Success	view			Scene: modernization to electric signal lights in rail yard. British Railways poster artwork.
1963	First Journey of Penydarren Locomotive, oil on canvas	view	62 × 75 cm. (24.4 × 29.5 in.)	Amgueddfa Cymru—National Museum Wales, Department of Industry, Cardiff, Wales	Scene: Richard Trevithick (1771–1833) and his "Pen-y-Darren" locomotive.
1964	The Pass Track (c. 1964), oil on canvas	view see Terence Cuneo website	114 × 138.5 cm. (44.9 × 54.5 in.)		Scene: Ffestiniog Railway rolling stock, Wales. British Railways poster artwork.
1965	Blue Train at Bowling Harbour (or Glasgow Electric, Helensburgh; Helensburgh Electric Railcar), oil on canvas	view	94 × 119.5 cm. (37 × 47 in.)	Glasgow Museums Resource Centre, Glasgow, Scotland	Scene: British Rail rolling stock—Class 303 "Blue Train"—at Bowling, West Dunbartonshire, Scotland.
1965	The Lickey Incline, oil on canvas	view see Terence Cuneo website	76.2 × 101.6 cm. (30 × 40 in.)		Scene: London, Midland and Scottish Railway rolling stock (No.5593/45593 Jubilee Kolhapur) thunders up Lickey Incline, Birmingham and Gloucester Railway, steepest gradient in English country. Artwork commissioned by Patrick Whitehouse OBE (1922–1993), pioneer in railway preservation.
1967	The Mistral, oil on canvas	view	57 × 101.5 cm. (22.4 × 40 in.)		Scene: SNCF rolling stock—Le Mistral.
1967	The Last of the Thoroughbreds, Great Western Castles in Sheds, Tyseley, Birmingham, oil on canvas	view	75 × 88 cm. (29.5 × 34.6 in.)		Scene: Great Western Railway rolling stock at Tyseley Locomotive Works, Birmingham, West Midlands.
1967	A Country Holt, acrylic on canvas	view			Scene: rolling stock at station in English countryside.
1968	Atmosphere of Steam, oil on canvas	view	61 × 119.5 cm. (24 × 47 in.)		
1968	Express Engines at Tyseley, oil on canvas	view view	75 × 100 cm. (29.5 × 39.4 in.)		Scene: rolling stock—London, Midland and Scottish Railway No.5593/45593 Jubilee Kolhapur and Great Western Railway No.7029 Clun Castle— at Tyseley Locomotive Works, Birmingham, West Midlands.
1969	King George V Steam Locomotive, No.6000 at the Bulmer Cider Mill, Hereford, oil on canvas	view	76 × 101.5 cm. (29.9 × 40 in.)		Scene: Great Western Railway rolling stock—King class No.6000 King George V; Bulmer Cider Mill, Hereford.
1969	At the Throttle of the Flying Scotsman (or Alan Pegler Driving Flying Scotsman), oil on canvas	view see Cuneo Society website	51 × 63.5 cm. (20.1 × 25 in.)		Scene: Alan Pegler (1920–2012); cab of Class A3 No.4472 Flying Scotsman.
1969	Westway, oil on canvas	view	76 × 103 cm. (29.9 × 40.6 in.)		
1970	Dolgoch Station on the Talyllyn Railway (c. 1970)	view view			Scene: Dolgoch railway station, Mid Wales, on Talyllyn Railway. British Railways poster artwork.
1970	Royal Scot on the Britannia Bridge, Menai Straits, oil on canvas	view	91.5 × 127 cm. (36 × 50 in.)		Scene: West Coast Main Line rolling stock—Royal Scot; Britannia Bridge, Menai Strait, Wales.
1971	Emerging from the Severn Tunnel, oil on canvas	view	62 × 75 cm. (24.4 × 29.5 in.)	Amgueddfa Cymru—National Museum Wales, Department of Industry, Cardiff, Wales	Scene: rolling stock emerging from Severn Tunnel.
1972	Freight from Port Shepstone - Memories of the Narrow Gauge, Natal, South Africa, oil on canvas	view	84 × 122 cm. (33.1 × 48 in.)		Scene: narrow gauge rolling stock; Port Shepstone, Natal, South Africa.
1973	Locomotive Halt, oil on canvas	view	51 × 66 cm. (20.1 × 26 in.)		
1975	The Evening Star, Freight Train, German State Railways, oil on canvas	view	63.5 × 76.5 cm. (25 × 30.1 in.)		Scene: German State Railways rolling stock−The Evening Star.
1975	Evening Freight to Knysna, oil on canvas	view	53.3 × 101.6 cm. (21 × 40 in.)		Scene: rolling stock heading to Knysna, South Africa.
1975	The Water Column, oil on canvas	view	54.5 × 76.2 cm. (21.5 × 30 in.)		Scene: rolling stock taking on water.
1978	Storm Over Southall Shed, oil on canvas	view see Terence Cuneo website	46 × 66.5 cm. (18.1 × 26.2 in.)		Scene: Great Western Railway rolling stock at Southall railway station, London.
1978	Sleigh Post, oil on canvas	view			
1979	Into the 80s, the APT, oil on canvas		Framed, 103 x 77.5 cm. (40.5 × 30.5 in.)	Science Museum, London	Scene: The prototype electric Advanced Passenger Train leaving Euston station, with historic diesel and steam locomotives of the LNWR and LMS in the background. Artwork commissioned by British Rail.
1984	Flying Cheltenham, oil on canvas	view	61 × 72.5 cm. (24 × 28.5 in.)	British Postal Museum and Archive	Scene: Great Western Railway rolling stock—Castle class Flying Cheltenham. Artwork commissioned by Royal Mail in 1984 for Famous Trains stamp issue (1985).
1984	Flying Scotsman, oil on canvas	view	48 x 73.5 cm. (18.9 x 28.9 in.)	British Postal Museum and Archive	Scene: London and North Eastern Railway rolling stock—Flying Scotsman. Artwork commissioned by Royal Mail in 1984 for Famous Trains stamp issue (1985).
1984	Royal Scot, oil on canvas	view	50 x 74 cm. (19.7 x 29.1 in.)	British Postal Museum and Archive	Scene: West Coast Main Line rolling stock—Royal Scot. Artwork commissioned by Royal Mail in 1984 for Famous Trains stamp issue (1985).
1984	Golden Arrow, oil on canvas	view	49 x 74 cm (19.3 x 29.1 in.)	British Postal Museum and Archive	Scene: Southern Railway rolling stock—Golden Arrow. Artwork commissioned by Royal Mail in 1984 for Famous Trains stamp issue (1985).
1984	King Richard III	view	74 x 99 cm (29.1 x 39 in.)	British Postal Museum and Archive	Scene: Great Western Railway rolling stock—King class No.6015 King Richard III. Artwork commissioned by Royal Mail in 1984 for Famous Trains stamp issue (1985).
1985	Ffestiniog Work Horses (or Festiniog Workhorses), oil on canvas	view view	102 × 178 cm. (40.2 × 70.1 in.)	Atkinson Art Gallery & Library, Southport	Scene: Ffestiniog Railway rolling stock. Artwork commissioned to celebrate 150th anniversary of opening of Ffestiniog Railway on 20 April 1836.
1985	Docklands Light Railway (c. 1985), acrylic on canvas	view			Scene: Docklands Light Railway rolling stock crossing West India Docks, Isle of Dogs, London.
1985	The Last of the Giants, oil on canvas	view	76.5 × 102 cm. (30.1 × 40.2 cm.)		
1985	Firefly Leaving Box Tunnel, Great Western Railway, oil on canvas	view	77 × 102 cm. (30.3 × 40.2 in.)		Scene: Great Western Railway rolling stock—Firefly class—leaving Box Tunnel, Box Hill, Wiltshire.
1988	Ready to Roll (c. 1988)	view			Scene: Southern Railway rolling stock—SR Merchant Navy class "Bulleid Pacific" No. 35027 Port Line.
1991	Construction of the Manchester Metrolink, oil on canvas	view	61 × 89.5 cm. (24 × 35.2 in.)		Scene: Manchester Metrolink.
1994	Golden Arrow, oil on canvas	view	75.5 × 102 cm. (29.7 × 40.2 in.)		Scene: Southern Railway rolling stock—Golden Arrow, Britannia Class No. 70004 William Shakespeare—arriving at rail yard (Dover Marine).
	Winston Churchill at Bournemouth Shed	view view			Scene: British Railway rolling stock—Battle of Britain Class No.34051 Winston Churchill—flanked by Southern Railway rolling stock—Merchant Navy class No.35029 Ellerman Lines and Q-1 Class No.33001.
	Duchess of Hamilton on Shap	see Cuneo Society website			
	Flying Scotsman, oil on canvas	view			Scene: London and North Eastern Railway rolling stock—Class A3 No.4472 Flying Scotsman.
	Bentley vs The Blue Train	view see Cuneo Society website			Scene: 1930 Cannes to Calais Maritime race.
	Evening Star	view see Terence Cuneo website			Scene: last steam locomotive built for British Railways—Standard class 9F No.92220 Evening Star.
	Castles at Tyseley	view see Terence Cuneo website			Scene: Great Western Railway rolling stock—Castle class—at Tyseley Locomotive Works, Birmingham, West Midlands.
	The Night King, acrylic on canvas	view view			Scene: Great Western Railway rolling stock—King class No.6000 King George V—steams through the night.
	The Great Marquess	view see Terence Cuneo website			Scene: London and North Eastern Railway rolling stock—Class K4 The Great Marquess—in the round house.
	Halfway between Edinburgh and London	view see Terence Cuneo website			Scene: rolling stock.
	Mallard	view			Scene: London and North Eastern Railway rolling stock—Class A4 No.4468 Mallard.
	Mallard at Speed, acrylic on canvas	view			Scene: London and North Eastern Railway rolling stock—Class A4 No.4468 Mallard.
	Cathedral Express	view			Scene: Great Western Railway rolling stock—Cathedral Express/Castle class No.7029 Clun Castle.
	Steam in the Rockies	view			Scene: Canadian Pacific Railway rolling stock—Hudson class steam locomotive—at Revelstoke, British Columbia, near Kicking Horse Pass.
	A Local Train Pulls Out	view			Scene: rolling stock—Nord class P8—in northern France.
	Departure from Paddington	view			Scene: rolling stock leaving Paddington station, London.
	Intercity (or Class 91, Bounds Green)	view			Scene: British Rail rolling stock—Class 91 electric locomotive—at Bounds Green traction maintenance depot.
	Le Shuttle, acrylic on canvas	view view			Scene: Eurotunnel Le Shuttle rolling stock.
	A Baldwin 141 R in France	view	61 × 76.2 cm. (24 × 30 in.)		Scene: SNCF Class 141R rolling stock by Baldwin Locomotive Works in France.
	Centenary Royal Albert Bridge, Saltash 1859-1959	view			Scene: rolling stock on Royal Albert Bridge spanning River Tamar, Saltash, Cornwall. British Railways poster artwork.
	Power, oil on canvas	view	51 × 76 cm. (20.1 × 29.9 in.)		
	An A4 Pacific Crossing the Forth, oil on canvas	view	91.4 × 137.1 cm. (36 × 54 in.)		Scene: London and North Eastern Railway rolling stock—A4 Pacific class—crossing Forth Bridge at night.
	Memories of Willesden Junction, oil on canvas	view view	77.5 × 101.6 cm. (30.5 × 40 in.)		Scene: rolling stock at Willesden Junction rail yard, Harlesden, London.
	Out of the Night, oil on canvas	view	92 × 137 cm. (36.2 × 53.9 in.)		Scene: rolling stock running at night.
	Double Header in the Highlands, Class Five on the Oban Line in Scotland, oil on canvas	view	71.6 × 92 cm. (28.2 × 36.2 in.)		Scene: London, Midland and Scottish Railway rolling stock—Class 5—on Oban Line in Scottish Highlands.
	Class 91, Durham Viaduct				Scene: British Rail rolling stock—Class 91 electric locomotive—at County Durham.
	Steam Train at the Station, oil on canvas	view	31.1 × 41.3 cm. (12.2 × 16.3 in.)		Scene: steam locomotive.
	Winter Express, oil on canvas	view	40.2 × 61 cm. (15.8 × 24 in.)		Scene: German State Railways rolling stock.
	Northbound Freight, Manitoba Canada, oil on canvas	view	28 × 36 cm. (71.1 × 91.4 in.)		Scene: rolling stock; Manitoba, Canada.
	On the Platform, oil on board	view	30.5 × 41.9 cm. (12 × 16.5 in.)		
	Racing the Train, oil on board	view	16.5 × 14 cm. (6.5 × 5.5 in.)		
	Big Boy on Sherman Hill, oil on canvas	view	30.5 × 61 cm. (12 × 24 in.)		
	The Crossing, oil on canvas	view	50.8 × 76.2 cm. (20 × 30 in.)		
	The Black Prince, oil on canvas	view	61 × 119.3 cm. (24 × 47 in.)		Scene: British Railways rolling stock—BR Standard Class 9F No.92203 Black Prince.
	Full Steam Ahead, oil on canvas	view	71 × 91.5 cm. (28 × 36 in.)		
	The Gradiant, acrylic on canvas	view			Scene: rolling stock on uphill journey.
	Voltage vs Stream, acrylic on canvas	view			Scene: rolling stock from two stages of transportation.
	Signal Box Great Western, acrylic on canvas	view			Scene: Great Western Railway signal box.
	Fleche d'Or, acrylic on canvas	view			Scene: Chemins de Fer du Nord rolling stock of Flèche d’Or.

== Automobile paintings ==
Year	Title	Image	Dimensions	Collection	Comments
1913	Brooklands, acrylic on canvas	view			Scene: race car at Brooklands racing circuit, Surrey; train in background.
1932	The Spirit of Brooklands 1932 (c. 1932), acrylic on canvas	view view			Scene: auto race at Brooklands racing circuit, Surrey; Sir Henry Birkin's (1896–1933) 4.5 litre Bentley versus John Cobb's (1899–1952) 10.5 litre Delage
1950	On the Brighton Road (c. 1950), oil on canvas	view	62 × 75 cm. (24.4 × 29.5 in.)	West Midlands Police Museum, Sparkhill Police Station, Sparkhill, Birmingham	Scene: motorists on Brighton Road.
1950	Racing Cars, 1950, oil on canvas	view			
1960	Monte Carlo Rally, oil on canvas	view	62.2 × 76.2 cm. (24.5 × 30 in.)		Scene: auto racing on beach at Monte Carlo, Monaco.
	The Shell Rally, oil on canvas	view	63.5 × 76 cm. (25 × 29.9 in.)		
	Sunbeam Rapier, oil on canvas	view	64 × 76 cm. (25.2 × 29.9 in.)		Scene: Sunbeam Rapier.
	Armstrong Siddeley, oil on canvas	view	59.5 × 72.5 cm. (23.4 × 28.5 in.)		Scene: Armstrong Siddeley.

== Industrial paintings ==
Year	Title	Image	Dimensions	Collection	Comments
1940	The Victory (c. 1940), watercolor and gouache on board	view	29.5 × 23.5 cm. (11.6 × 9.3 in.)		Scene: HMS Victory at sea.
1940	RMS Queen Elizabeth (c. 1940), oil on board	view	37 × 29.5 cm. (14.6 × 11.6 in.)		Scene: RMS Queen Elizabeth at sea.
1940	RMS Empress of Britain (c. 1940), watercolor and gouache on board	view	33.5 × 27 cm. (13.2 × 101.6 in.)		Scene: RMS Empress of Britain near port.
1940	The Strathnaver Dropping Her Pilot off Dover (c. 1940), watercolor and gouache on board	view	30 × 23.5 cm. (11.8× 9.3 in.)		Scene: launching RMS Strathnaver near Dover, Kent.
1940	The Shamrock at Cowes (c. 1940), watercolor and gouache on board	view	29.5 × 23.5 cm. (11.6 × 9.3 in.)		Scene: Shamrock at sea off Cowes, Isle of Wight.
1943	Interior of a Plane Making Factory, oil on canvas laid on board	view	50.8 × 71 cm. (20 × 28 in.)		
1944	Happy Landing: Tyre Production, Happy Landing: Tyre Production	view	57.5 x 72.5 cm. (22.6 x 28.5 in.)	Royal Air Force Museum	Scene: men at work in production of airplane tires.
1944	Bristol Aircraft Company Assembly Line, oil on canvas	view	50.8 × 76.2 cm. (20 × 30 in.)	Royal Air Force Museum	Scene: Bristol Aeroplane Company
1944	Giant in the Background: 'Giant Extruder', oil on canvas	view	51 × 76 cm. (20.1 × 29.9 in.)	Royal Air Force Museum	
1944	Implement of Victory: Spar-Mill, oil on canvas	view	56 × 50.5 cm. (22 × 19.9 in.)	Royal Air Force Museum	
1946	Miles Marathon in Flight, oil on canvas	view	50 × 75 cm. (19.7 × 29.5 in.)	Royal Air Force Museum	Scene: Handley Page Marathon.
1947	Melting Shop at the Birmingham Works of Henry Wiggin	view			Scene: inside the Henry Wiggin plant, Birmingham, England.
	Universal Mill at the Birmingham Works of Henry Wiggin	view			Scene: inside the Henry Wiggin plant, Birmingham, England.
	Rod Mill at the Birmingham Works of Henry Wiggin	view			Scene: inside the rod mill, Henry Wiggin plant, Birmingham, England.
	The Testing of Magnetic Alloys at the Development and Research Laboratory, Birmingham	view			
	Extrusion Press at the Glasgow Works of Henry Wiggin	view			Scene: inside the Henry Wiggin plant, Glasgow, Scotland.
1948	Crane, oil on canvas	view	75 × 62.5 cm. (29.5 × 24.6 in.)		
1949	The Holman Test Mine, oil on canvas	view	76 × 62 cm. (29.9 × 24.4 in.)	Royal Cornwall Museum, Truro, Cornwall	Scene: Holman Bros. Ltd. was a Cornish engineering family firm founded in 1801; it gained a worldwide reputation in mining equipment manufacture and merged in 1968 with Broom Wade of High Wycombe to become CompAir (UK) Ltd. The company closed in December 2003.
1949	Comet Taking Off, oil on canvas	view	75 × 62.1 cm. (29.5 × 24.5 in.)	Defence Academy of the United Kingdom, Shrivenham, Oxfordshire	
1949	Beam Engine Cylinder with Figure, oil on canvas	view	63 × 76 cm. (24.8 × 29.9 in.)	Royal Cornwall Museum, Truro, Cornwall	Scene:Scene: Holman Bros. Ltd., Camborne, Cornwall.
1950	A Machine Shop, Camborne Works, oil on canvas	view	63 × 76 cm. (24.8 × 29.9 in.)	Royal Cornwall Museum, Truro, Cornwall	Scene: Holman Bros. Ltd., Camborne, Cornwall.
1950	Trevithick and Holman with High Pressure Boiler, oil on canvas	view	76 × 50 cm. (29.9 × 19.7 in.)	Royal Cornwall Museum, Truro, Cornwall	Scene: Richard Trevithick (1771–1833); Nicholas Holman, Holman Bros. Ltd.
1950	Conversation Piece, oil on canvas	view	85 × 111 cm. (33.5 × 43.7 in.)	Royal Cornwall Museum, Truro, Cornwall	Scene: Holman Bros. Ltd., Camborne, Cornwall
1950	Walking Dragline Excavator on an Opencast Coal Site at Whitley Bay, oil on canvas	view	64 × 76.5 cm. (25.2 × 30.1 in.)		Scene: walking dragline excavator; opencast coal mine, Whitley Bay, Tyne and Wear.
1950	Steel Works at Magram, oil on canvas	view	64 × 77 cm. (25.2 × 30.3 in.)		
1950	Twin Batch Paver on Runway Construction, oil on canvas	view	64 × 76 cm. (25.2 × 29.9 in.)		
1950	Oil Refinery, oil on canvas		63 × 76 c. (24.8 × 29.9 in.)		
1951	Shaft Collar during Construction at a Gold Mine in the Orange Free State, oil on canvas	view	63 x 76 cm. (24.8 x 29.9 in.)		Scene: mine construction; Orange Free State.
1951	Power Station under Construction at Plymouth, oil on canvas	view	63 × 76 cm. (24.8 × 29.9 in.)		Scene: Plymouth, Devon.
1951	Power Station and Wharf under Construction at Plymouth, oil on canvas	view	63 × 76 cm. (24.8 × 29.9 in.)		Scene: Plymouth, Devon.
1952	Clearing Woodland - The Vickers Vigor Tractor, oil on canvas	view	64.5 × 85 cm. (25.4 × 33.5 in.)		Scene: Vickers Vigor tractor at work.
1952	Earth Mover in Woodland, oil on canvas	view	76 × 63 cm. (29.9 × 24.8 in.)		Scene: creating a field from woodland.
1953	Earth Mover, oil on canvas	view	76 × 63 cm. (29.9 × 24.8 in.)		Scene: creating a field from woodland.
1953	Earth Mover and Workers, oil on canvas	view	76 × 63 cm. (29.9 × 24.8 in.)		Scene: creating a field from woodland.
1953	The Gas Light, oil on canvas	view	76.2 × 101.5 cm. (30 × 40 .in.)		Scene: gas lighting.
1953	Coryton Oil Refinery, oil on canvas	view	64 × 76.5 cm. (25.2 × 30.1 in.)		Scene: Coryton Refinery, Essex.
1953	Eight-Storey Office Building for the Public Works Dept. Johannesburg,	view	64 × 76.5 cm. (25.2 × 30.1 in.)		Scene: Johannesburg, South Africa.
1954	Jet Engine on a Test Bed, oil on canvas	view	63.5 × 76.5 cm. (25 × 30.1 in.)	Science Museum, South Kensington, London	
1955	Early Stages of Construction of the New Cathedral Church of St. Michael, Coventry, oil on canvas	view	76 × 102 cm. (29.9 × 40.2 in.)		Scene: construction of St. Michael's Cathedral, Coventry, West Midlands, 1956–62.
1955	The Frood-Stobie Open Pit at Copper Cliff, Northern Ontario	view			Scene: Frood-Stobie open pit mine, Greater Sudbury, Ontario.
1955	At the Stope of the Frood Mine	view		Vale Canada Ltd headquarters, Toronto, Ontario (?)	Scene: two miners drilling an underground rock face, Frood Mine.
1955	Miners Leaving the Cage at the Surface of the Frood Mine	view		Vale Canada Ltd headquarters, Toronto, Ontario (?)	Scene: underground miners exiting the cage, Frood Mine.
1955	The Convertor Aisle at the Copper Cliff Smelter	view		Vale Canada Ltd headquarters, Toronto, Ontario (?)	Scene: inside the Copper Cliff smelter, Greater Sudbury, Ontario.
1955	The Wire-Bar Casting Wheel at the Copper Refinery	view		Vale Canada Ltd headquarters, Toronto, Ontario (?)	Scene: inside the Copper Cliff Copper Refinery, Greater Sudbury, Ontario.
1955	The Electrolytic Cell House	view		Vale Canada Ltd headquarters, Toronto, Ontario (?)	Scene: inside the nickel refinery, Port Colborne, Ontario.
	Chemicals Department of the Clydach Refinery	view			Scene: inside the nickel refinery, Clydach, Swansea, Wales.
	The Decomposer Aisle at the Clydach Nickel Refinery	view			Scene: inside the nickel refinery, Clydach, Swansea, Wales.
	Wet Process Section of the Acton Precious Metals Refinery	view			Scene: inside the precious metals refinery, Acton, London.
1955	Extrusion Press at the Hereford Works of Henry Wiggin	view			Scene: inside Henry Wiggin plant, Hereford, England.
1955	Forging Hammer at the International Nickel Company's Huntington, West Virginia Works	view			Scene: forging hammer, Huntington, West Virginia.
1955	Rolling Mill at Huntington	view			Scene: rolling mill, Huntington, West Virginia.
1955	International Nickel Company's Bayonne, N.J., Foundry	view			Scene: casting floor, Bayonne, New Jersey.
1955	The International Nickel Company's Wrightsville Atmospheric Corrosion-Testing Station	view			Scene: Wrightsville Beach, North Carolina.
	Inco's Kure Beach Sea Water Corrosion-Testing Station	view			Scene: Kure Beach, North Carolina.
1956	Electrical Engineering Workshop, oil on canvas		366 × 457.5 cm (144 × 180.1 in.)	Science Museum, South Kensington, London	
1956	Constructing the Hoover Dam, oil on canvas	view	76 × 102 cm. (29.9 × 40.2 in.)		Scene: Hoover Dam, Black Canyon of Colorado River, Arizona/Nevada.
1957	Dam for a Reservoir in the Mountains of Mourne, oil on canvas	view	74 × 86 cm. (29.1 × 33.9 in.)		Scene: Mourne Mountains, County Down, Northern Ireland.
1958	Berkely Power Station, oil on canvas	view	76 × 102 cm. (29.9 × 40.2 in.)		Scene: power station under construction.
1959	Coventry No.2, oil on canvas	view	76 × 101.5 cm. (29.9 × 40 in.)		
1960	Trans-Canada Highway in the Rocky Mountains, British Columbia, oil on canvas	view	76 × 102 cm. (29.9 × 40.2 in.)		Scene: construction of Trans-Canada Highway, British Columbia.
1960	Queensborough Bridge, New Westminster, British Columbia, oil on canvas	view	76 × 102 cm. (29.9 × 40.2 in.)		Scene: construction of Queensborough Bridge, Fraser River, New Westminster, British Columbia, 1960.
1960	Annacis Industrial Estate, British Columbia, oil on canvas	view	81 × 81 cm. (31.9 × 31.9 in.)		Scene: Annacis Island, Fraser River, British Columbia.
1960	B.C. Electricity, Vancouver, oil on canvas	view	64 × 76.5 cm. (25.2 × 30.1 in.)		Scene: Vancouver, British Columbia.
1962	Richard Trevithick's London Road Carriage (1962–72), oil on canvas	view	35.5 x 46 cm. (14 x 18.1 in.)	Science Museum, South Kensington, London	Scene: Richard Trevithick (1771–1833); London Steam Carriage.
1964	The Post Office Tower from Clipstone Street, oil on board	view	98 × 73.5 cm. (38.6 × 28.9 in.)	British Postal Museum & Archive	Scene: Post Office Tower, Fitzrovia, London.
1966	Brittanic House, Moorfields, oil on canvas	view	102 × 76 cm. (40.2 × 29.9 in.)		Scene: construction at Moorfields, City of London.
1967	North Sea Gas Pipeline, oil on canvas	view	76 × 101.5 cm. (29.9 × 40 in.)		
1974	Greythorpe Oil Rig, oil on canvas	view	99 × 136 cm. (39 × 53.5 in.)		
1978	Isle of Grain, oil on canvas	view	77 × 101 cm. (30.3 × 39.8 in.)		Scene: Isle of Grain, Hoo Peninsula, Medway.
1979	Floatout, Conoco's Murchison Jacket, Ardersier, Highlands, oil on canvas	view	75 × 100 cm. (29.5 × 39.4 in.)	Aberdeen Maritime Museum, Aberdeen, Scotland	Scene: construction of Murchison oil platform; jacket being floated out into the North Sea.
1981	The Test House, oil on canvas	view	73.5 × 59 cm. (28.9 × 23.2 in.)	Royal Air Force Museum	Scene: aircraft manufacturing.
1983	Raising of the Mary Rose, oil on canvas	view	127 × 102 cm. (50 × 40.2 in.)		Scene: salvage of the Mary Rose; Babcock Power Construction in operation.
1984	Mating (or Mating, Conoco's Hutton Tension Platform), oil on canvas	view view		Aberdeen Maritime Museum, Aberdeen, Scotland	Scene: Conoco's Hutton tension-leg platform, Moray Firth, Scotland, May 1984.
1990	RMC Silos, Thurrock, oil on canvas	view	61 x 91.5 cm. (24 x 36 in.)		Scene: Thurrock, Essex.
1990	Sizewell at Night, oil on canvas	view	76 x 101.5 cm. (29.9 x 40 in.)		Scene: construction of Sizewell nuclear power station, Sizewell, Suffolk.
1991	Toyota Factory, oil on canvas	view	76 × 101 cm. (29.9 × 39.8 in.)		Scene: Toyota Manufacturing UK, Burnaston, Derbyshire.
1991	Pen-Y-Clip, Conway, oil on canvas	view	76 × 102 cm. (29.9 × 40.2 in.)		Scene: construction of Pen-y-Clip Tunnels (North Wales Expressway), Conwy, Wales.
1992	Construction Site, oil on canvas	view	76 × 102 cm. (29.9 × 40.2 in.)		
1994	Bridge under Construction, oil on canvas	view	76 × 102 cm. (29.2 × 40.2 in.)		
	The Fire Whim at East Pool, oil on canvas	view	48 × 35 cm. (18.9 × 13.8 in.)	Royal Cornwall Museum, Truro, Cornwall	Scene: winding engine house; last Cornish beam engine built by Holman Bros. Ltd. in 1887; East Pool mine, near Pool, Cornwall; now Cornwall and West Devon Mining Landscape, World Heritage Site.
	Broomyard Factory (or Bromyard Foundry), oil on canvas	view	76 × 101 cm. (29.9 × 39.8 in.)		
	At the Heavy Planet Repair Shop, oil on canvas	view	63 × 76 cm. (24.8 × 29.9 in.)		
	dredging operation, oil	view			
	sheet metal plant	view			

=== Paintings on post-war Dagenham vehicle production ===
Year	Title	Image	Dimensions	Collection	Comments
	Dagenham Jetty				
	Final Assembly				
	Quality Inspection				
	Vehicle Inspection				

== Animal paintings ==
Year	Title	Image	Dimensions	Collection	Comments
1956	Chico, oil on canvas	view	62.5 × 75 cm. (24.6 × 29.5 in.)		Scene: horse with western saddle.
1986	Royal Stallion	view			
1992	The Sale, oil on canvas	view			Scene: horse sale.
	Shire Horse and Foals (or Shire and Foals)	view see Terence Cuneo website			Scene: Shire horses in countryside.
	The Shires	view			Scene: Shire horses in countryside with storm approaching.
	Indian Ponies, oil on canvas	view	65 × 76 cm. (25.6 × 29.9 in.)		
	The Puppy Show, Wynnstay, oil on canvas	view	76.2 × 101.6 cm. (30 × 40 in.)		Scene: Wynnstay, Wales.
	Donkeycade, acrylic on canvas	view			

== Mouse cartoons ==
Year	Title	Image	Dimensions	Collection	Comments
1958	The Honourable Mrs. Lavina Vole and Her Daughter Vanessa, oil on canvas	view view	30 × 25 cm. (11.8 × 9.8 in.)		
1959	Lady Josephine Caerphilly with Her Page 'Cheddar', oil on canvas	view	30 × 25 cm. (11.8 × 9.8 in.)		
1962	Stilton Junction, Great Gnawing Railway	view			Scene: pastiche of The Railway Station, 1862, by William Firth.
1970	The Opportunist (c. 1970)	view see Terence Cuneo website			
1970	The Gambler (or The Rt Hon. Percy Blue Vinney OGM, Master Gambler at the Scalded Cat Saloon and The Black Mouse of the Family) (c. 1970)	view see Terence Cuneo website			
1971	Lord Nelson, oil on canvas	view	35.5 × 25.5 cm. (14 × 10 in.)		
1971	Lady Nelson, oil on canvas	view	35.5 × 25.5 cm. (14 × 10 in.)		
1974	Anthony, oil on canvas	view see Cuneo Society website	35.5 × 25.4 cm. (14 × 10 in.)		
1977	The Cheese Fair	view see Terence Cuneo website			
	Cleopatra	view			
	Trumpeter	see Cuneo Society website			
	The Gun Mouse	see Cuneo Society website			
	Brunel	see Cuneo Society website			
	Running Sheds	view see Terence Cuneo website			
	Isambard Kingdom	see Terence Cuneo website			
	The Grand Brie	view			Scene: whimsical auto race at the finish line.
	D'Artagnan and the Three Mousketeers	view			Scene: 4 heroes celebrate festive evening at inn.
	Bold bad Dick Fondente on His Faithful Chestnut Stoat Bresse-Bleu, oil on canvas	view	35 × 25 cm. (13.8 × 9.8 in.)		

== International paintings ==
Year	Title	Image	Dimensions	Collection	Comments
1937	The Little Harbour, oil on canvasboard	view	48 × 35.5 cm. (18.9 × 14 in.)		
1968	Loading Sampans at Dawn in Hong Kong (c. 1968; or Figures Loading Barges at Dawn, Hong Kong), oil on canvas	view	50.8 × 61 cm. (20 × 24 in.)		Scene: Sampans, Hong Kong.
1973	A Tank Engine, oil on canvas	view	51 × 66 cm. (20.1 × 26 in.)		
1974	Le Citoyen Claude Cochon de l'Armee de la Liberte de la France, oil on canvas	view	35 × 25.5 cm. (13.8 × 10 in.)		
1980	A Nomadic Woman, oil on canvas	view	50.8 x 61 cm. (20 x 24 in.)		
1991	Arctic Exploration, oil on canvas	view	50.8 × 76.2 cm. (20 × 30 in.)		
	The Paddy Fields	see Cuneo Society website			
	The Grain Market, oil on canvas	view	62 × 72 cm. (24.4 × 28.3 in.)	Paisley Museum and Art Galleries, Paisley, Renfrewshire, Scotland	
	Domingo, Figures and Donkeys in a Street, oil on canvas	view	60 × 50 cm. (23.6 × 19.7 in.)		
	The Edge of the Jungle, Penang, Malaya, oil on canvas	view	50.8 × 61 cm. (20 × 24 in.)		Scene: Penang, Malaysia.
	Donkey Pool, Rhodes, oil on canvas	view	49 × 75 cm. (19.3 × 29.5 in.)		Scene: Rhodes, Greece.
	Mexico, acrylic on canvas	view			Scene: Mexico
	Little Bedouin Girl, acrylic on canvas	view			Scene: Bedouin girl in Jordan.

=== Africa ===
Year	Title	Image	Dimensions	Collection	Comments
1951	Voortrekker Monument from the Amphitheatre, Pretoria, South Africa, oil on canvas	view	64 × 76.5 cm. (25.2 × 30.1 in.)		Scene: Voortrekker Monument, Pretoria, South Africa.
1951	African Dance, oil on canvas	view	74 × 100.4 cm. (29.1 × 39.5 in.)		
1951	Cape House, Johannesburg, oil on canvas	view	63 × 76 cm. (24.8 × 29.9 in.)		Scene: Johannesburg, South Africa.
1951	Paper Mills during Construction in the Transvaal, oil on canvas	view	63 × 76 cm. (24.8 × 29.9 in.)		Scene: paper mills; Transvaal Province, South Africa.
1968	Giraffe before Mount Kenya, oil on canvas	view	39 × 65 cm. (15.4 × 25.6 in.)		Scene: Mount Kenya, Kenya.
1968	The Old Tusker before Mount Kilimanjaro, oil on canvas	view	65 × 100 cm. (25.6 × 39.4 in.)		Scene: African elephant; Mount Kilimanjaro, Tanzania.
1968	A Family of Warthog Moving On, oil on canvas	view	75 × 100.5 cm. (29.5 × 39.6 in.)		Scene: warthog.
1968	Evening Return, Haut Bay, Cape Town, oil on canvas	view	54 × 76 cm. (21.3 × 29.9 in.)		Scene: Hout Bay, Cape Town, South Africa.
1968	Old Harbour, Mombasa, oil on canvas	view	76 × 102 cm. (29.9 × 40.2 in.)		Scene: Mombasa, Kenya.
1973	In the Port of Massawa, Ethiopia, oil on canvas	view	51 × 76 cm. (20.1 × 29.9 in.)		Scene: Massawa, Ethiopia (now Eritrea).
1973	On the Edge of the Rift Valley, Ethiopia, oil on canvas	view	61 × 102 cm. (24 × 40.2 in.)		Scene: Rift Valley, Ethiopia.
1973	The return to the village, Ethiopia (Near Ankober), oil on canvas	view	61 × 101.5 cm. (24 × 40 in.)		Scene: Ankober, Ethiopia.
1980	The Market, Arusha, East Africa, oil on canvas	view	51 × 76 cm. (20.1 × 29.9 in.)		Scene: Arusha, Tanzania.
	The Ethiopian Horseman, oil on canvas	view	45.7 × 55.9 cm. (18 × 22 in.)		
	The Malay Quarter, Cape Town	see Cuneo Society website			Scene: Malay Quarter, Cape Town, South Africa.
	Down to the Pool, a Lion and a Pair of Blue Ververt Monkeys, oil on canvas	view	69 × 90 cm. (27.2 × 35.4 in.)		
	The Tribal Dance, acrylic on canvas	view			

=== Italy ===
Year	Title	Image	Dimensions	Collection	Comments
1985	The Gondolier, oil on canvas	view	46 × 61 cm. (18.1 × 24 in.)		Scene: Venice, Italy.
1988	Venice, oil on canvas	view	31 × 46 cm. (12.2 × 18.1 in.)		Scene: Venice, Italy.
1988	Venetian Gondolas, oil on canvas	view	48.5 × 74.5 cm. (19.1 × 29.3 in.)		
1988	Moored Gondola, Venice, oil on canvas	view	50.8 × 61 cm. (20 × 24 in.)		Scene: Venice, Italy.
1989	Venetian Canal, oil on canvas	view	25.4 × 34.9 cm. (10 × 13.7 in.)		Scene: Venice, Italy.
	The Quiet Backwater, Venice	see Cuneo Society website			Scene: Venice, Italy.
	The Grand Canal, Venice, oil on canvas	view	60.9 × 76.2 cm. (24 × 30 in.)		Scene: Grand Canal, Venice, Italy.
	Dawn at Camogli, near Portofino, Italy, oil on canvas	view	61 × 51 cm. (24 × 20.1 in.)		Scene: Camogli, Portofino, Italy.
	The Charcoal Boat, Camogli, Italy, oil on canvas	view	59.5 × 49.5 cm. (23.4 × 19.5 in.)		Scene: Camogli, Portofino, Italy.
	Exterior of Italian Café, oil on canvas	view	63.5 × 76.2 cm. (25 × 30 in.)		
	Italian Café, oil on canvas	view	62 × 75 cm. (24.4 × 29.5 in.)		

=== Spain ===
Year	Title	Image	Dimensions	Collection	Comments
1957	The Matador (or Bullfighter), oil on canvas	view	63.5 × 76.2 cm. (25 × 30 in.)		
1957	Preparing for the Bull Fight, oil on canvas		63.5 × 76 cm. (25 × 29.9 in.)		
1962	The Spanish Horse, Medina del Campo, Spain, oil on canvas	view	62 × 74 cm. (24.4 × 29.1 in.)		Scene: Medina del Campo, Spain.
1972	Study in the Sun, Ibiza, oil on canvas	view	59.6 × 64.7 cm. (23.5 × 25.5 in.)		Scene: Ibiza, Spain.
	The Green Cart, Northern Spain, oil on canvas		36.2 × 40.7 cm. (14.3 × 16 in.)		
	The Picador, oil on canvas	view	57.2 × 76.2 cm. (22.5 × 30 in.)		Scene: picador.

=== Thailand ===
Year	Title	Image	Dimensions	Collection	Comments
1965	Temple Dancers, Bangkok, oil on canvas	view	51 × 61 cm. (20.1 × 24 in.)		Scene: Bangkok, Thailand.
1968	China Clay Barges, Bangkok (c. 1968), oil on canvas	view	50.8 × 61 cm. (20 × 24 in.)		Scene: Bangkok, Thailand.
	The Temple, Bangkok, oil on canvas	view	51 × 61 cm. (20.1 × 24 in.)		Scene: Bangkok, Thailand.
	The Floating Market, Bangkok, oil on canvas	view	50.8 × 60.9 cm. (20 × 24 in.)		Scene: Bangkok, Thailand.

=== American West ===
Year	Title	Image	Dimensions	Collection	Comments
1973	Horse and Rider with His Dog, oil on canvas	view	50.5 × 76 cm. (19.9 × 29.9 in.)		
	A Day's Work Done	see Cuneo Society website			
	Gunfight at the OK Corral	view see Terence Cuneo website			Scene: gunfight at OK Corral, between 3 Earp brothers and Clanton gang; artwork based on rough sketch approved by Wyatt Earp himself.
	Herding the Horses, oil on canvas	view	63.5 × 76.2 cm. (25 × 30 in.)		
	Bryce Canyon, Utah, U.S.A., oil on canvas	view	41.5 × 51 cm. (16.3 × 20.1 in.)		Scene: rolling stock running through Bryce Canyon, Utah.
	The Salt Lick, Pitchfork Ranch, Texas, oil on canvas	view	63.5 × 76.2 cm. (25 × 30 in.)		Scene: Pitchfork Ranch, Texas.
	The Salt Lick, oil on canvas	view	63.5 × 76.2 cm. (25 × 30 in.)		
	Moving Herd, oil on canvas	view	50.8 × 76.2 cm. (20 × 30 in.)		
	Pony Express, oil on canvas	view	60 × 90 cm. (23.6 × 35.4 in.)		Scene: Pony Express.

== Miscellaneous paintings ==
Year	Title	Image	Dimensions	Collection	Comments
1944	The Old Smock Mill, Kent, oil on board	view	21 × 15 cm. (8.3 × 5.9 in.)		Scene: smock mill, Kent.
1947	Scenery Painters, oil on canvas	view	64 × 76 cm. (25.2 × 29.9 in.)		
1948	Britain in Winter; Shooting Party Outside the Flying Swan, oil on canvasboard	view	63.5 × 54.6 cm. (25 × 21.5 in.)		
1948	Britain in Autumn				
1948	Britain in Summer				
1948	Britain in Spring				
1949	The Underwriting Room at Lloyd's of London, November 1948, oil on canvas/acrylic on canvas	view view			Scene: Lloyd's of London.
1950	Royal Show, oil on canvas	view	85 × 110 cm. (33.5 × 43.3 in.)		
1952	Massey Harris Harvesters, oil on canvas	view	62.5 × 75 cm. (24.6 × 29.5 in.)		Scene: Massey Harris harvesters at work.
1952	The Boat Workshop, oil on canvas	view	63.5 × 76 cm. (25 × 29.9 in.)		
1955	The Bottle Neck, Lewes, oil on canvas	view view	91.4 × 61 cm. (36 × 24 in.)		Scene: street scene; Lewes, East Sussex. British Rail poster artwork.
1956	Gardener with Mill and Millstream Beyond, oil on canvas	view	61 × 76 cm. (24 × 29.9 in.)		
1962	Tottenham v. Burnley, F.A. Challenge Cup, 1962, oil on canvas	view	121.9 × 182 cm. (48 × 71.7 in.)		Scene: Football Association Challenge Cup, Wembley Stadium; Tottenham Hotspur F.C. vs. Burnley F.C.
1967	Waterloo Station, oil on canvas	view	366 × 610 cm. (144 × 240 in.)	Science Museum, South Kensington, London	Scene: London Waterloo station. Artwork on loan to the National Railway Museum.
1970	A View of Chiswick, oil on canvas		61 × 101.5 cm. (24 × 40 in.)		Scene: Chiswick, London.
1970	Kew Gardens (or The Temple at Kew), oil on canvas	view	61 × 101.6 cm. (24 × 40 in.)		Scene: Royal Botanic Gardens, Kew.
1971	The Eastern Counties Otter Hounds, the Guist Bridge Meet, River Wensum, 31st August 1970, oil on canvas	view	122 × 185 cm. (48 × 72.8 in.)		Scene: Otter Hounds; River Wensum; Guist, Norfolk.
	Hounslow Heath 1919	see Terence Cuneo website			Scene: Ffestiniog Railway; Merddin Emrys and Linda at Tan-y-Bwlch.
	The Old Customs House, Fowey, Cornwall, oil on canvas	view	60 × 50 cm. (23.6 × 19.7 in.)		Scene: custom house, Fowey, Cornwall.
	A Child Sitting in the Sun, oil on canvas	view	61 × 50.8 cm. (61 × 20 in.)		
	The Modelmaker, oil on canvasboard	view	48 × 35.6 cm. (18.9 × 14 in.)		
	Ploughing the Fields, oil on canvas	view	63.5 × 76.2 cm. (25 × 30 in.)		
	Flowers in a Cart, oil on canvasboard	view	40.6 × 50.8 cm. (16 × 20 in.)		Scene: still life.
	Prince Frederick's Barge, oil on canvas	view	63.5 × 76.8 cm. (25 × 30.2 in.)		Scene: Prince Frederick's Barge, neo-Palladian state barge built in 1732 for Frederick, Prince of Wales (1707–1751), eldest son of King George II (1683–1760).
	Rush Hour Traffic, oil on paper laid with board	view	48.5 × 61.5 cm. (19.1 × 24.2 in.)		
	Giselle, Covent Garden, oil on canvas	view	59 × 40 cm. (23.2 × 15.7 in.)		Scene: Giselle, Covent Garden, London.
	Portrait of Tania, oil on canvas	view	77 × 115 cm. (30.3 × 45.3 in.)		Scene: full length reclining nude.
	The Omnibus, oil on board	view	13 × 17 cm. (5.1 × 6.7 in.)		
	Essex Water-mill				Scene: Essex.
	The Watermill, oil on canvas	view	63 × 76 cm. (24.8 × 29.9 in.)		
	A High Wind, oil on board		17.5 × 14.5 cm. (6.9 × 5.7 in.)		
	Hyde Park Corner, oil on canvas		75 × 100.5 cm. (29.5 × 39.6 in.)		Scene: Hyde Park Corner.
	Lady with Parasol, oil	view	98 × 75 cm. (38.6 × 29.5 in.)		
	Farm Scene, oil on canvas	view	62 × 75 cm. (24.4 × 29.5 in.)		
	Dante's Inferno, acrylic on canvas	view			Scene: Inferno, Divine Comedy by Dante Alighieri.
	artist's home and studio	see Cuneo Society website			Scene: Surrey.

== Illustrations ==
Year	Title	Image	Dimensions	Collection	Comments
1929	Illustration for The Vanishing Trail (John Sweet, Chums #1896, 8 January 1929)				
1929	Illustration for Son of the Legion (Lewis Allen, Chums #1917, 4 June 1929)				
1929	Illustrations for The Secret of the Castle (Cedric Weston, Chums #1921, 2 July 1929)				
1929	Illustration for Cordillera Gold (14 part serial; Eric W. Townsend, Chums #1934-1947, October–December, 1929)				
1930	Illustration for The Flying Spy! (14 part serial; George E. Rochester, The Magnet v38 #1169-1182, July–October, 1930)				
1931	Illustrations for The White Arab (16 part serial; Percy F. Westerman, Chums v40 #2026-2041, July–October, 1931)				
1932	Illustrations for The Red Falcon! (18 part serial; Arthur Steffens, The Magnet v38 #1279-1295, August–December, 1932)				
1933	Illustration for Outlawed (Cecil Fanshaw, The Greyfriars Holiday Annual 1934, Amalgamated Press, released 1933)				
1934	Illustration for Tales of the Sea, 1934 (Percy F. Westerman, Raphael Tuck & Sons)				
1936	Illustrations for The Black Ray (6 part serial; Stanton Hope, Chums Annual 1935–1936)				
1937	Illustrations for Red Falcon the Pirate Hunter (6 part serial; S. Walkey, Chums Annual 1937)				
1938	Illustration for The Riddle of the Forests (Eric W. Townsend, Chums Annual 1938)				
1938	Illustration for The Secret of the Fiord (Ernest McKeag, Chums Annual 1938)				
1938	Illustration for Typhoon (E. Halwell, The Wide World Magazine v80 #478, January 1938)				
1938	Illustration for Pipe-Line Pirates (E. W. Barton, The Wide World Magazine v80 #480, March 1938)				
1938	Illustration for River of Mystery (Stuart Martin, The Wide World Magazine v80 #481, April 1938)				
1938	Illustration for Touch and Go (Philip H. Godsell, FRGS, The Wide World Magazine v80 #481, April 1938)				
1938	Illustration for A Matter of Salvage (Captain T. P. Wilson, The Wide World Magazine v80 #482, May 1938)				
1938	Illustration for "Lightering" (David Head, The Wide World Magazine v81 #482, May 1938)				
1938	Illustration for The Man Who Turned Pirate (E. K. Berdan and J. E. Hogg, The Wide World Magazine v81 #484, July 1938)				
1938	Illustration for Posted as Missing (Captain R. Barry O'Brien, The Wide World Magazine v81 #485, August 1938)				
1938	Illustration for The Leopards of Mbwongo (Captain H. Hichens, The Wide World Magazine v82 #488, November 1938)				
1938	Illustration for "Pigeon" (W. Charnley, The Wide World Magazine v82 #489, December 1938)				
1939	Illustration for The Iron Thunderbolt (Bruce Arthur, Chums Annual 1939)				
1939	Illustration for In the Gun-Runner’s Grip (W. O. Woods, Chums Annual 1939)				
1939	Illustration for O, My Name Is William Kidd (Stephen Vincent Benét, Illustrated, v1 #22, 29 July 1939, Odhams Press)				
1939-1945	Untitled (illustration for Ditty Box magazine), oil			The National Archives, Kew, Richmond, UK	Scene: lifeboat on waves. INF 3/678
1940	Illustration for Heroic Hector (E. D. Dickinson, The Illustrated London News, Christmas 1940				The Illustrated London News.
1941	Illustration for Fighting for Freedom, 1941 (Percy F. Westerman, Blackie and Son Ltd.)				
1944	Cover illustration for Secret Convoy, 1944 (Percy F. Westerman)	view			
1944	Illustration for Engage the Enemy Closely, 1944 (Percy F. Westerman, Blackie and Son Ltd.)				
1945	Cover illustration for the Victory issue of The Illustrated London News, 12 May 1945	view			The Illustrated London News.
1945	Illustration for Alan Carr in Command, 1945 (Percy F. Westerman, Blackie and Son Ltd.)				
1946	Illustration for By Luck and by Pluck, 1946 (Percy F. Westerman, Blackie and Son Ltd.)				
1946	Illustration for Squadron Leader, 1946 (Percy F. Westerman, Blackie and Son Ltd.)	view			
1946	Cover illustration for John Bull	view			John Bull.
1947	Cover illustration for John Bull	view			John Bull.
1949	Illustration for Wyatt Earp and the Clinton Gang (Stuart N. Lake, The Strand v118 #706, October 1949				
1953–1958	Illustration for Armstrong Siddeley 'Sapphire' Cars, oil on canvas	view	64 x 77 cm. (25.2 x 30.3 in.)	Herbert Art Gallery and Museum, Coventry, West Midlands	Scene: Sapphire motor car (blue) produced by Armstrong Siddeley Motors Limited.
1953–1958	Illustration for Armstrong Siddeley 'Sapphire' Cars, oil on canvas	view	77 x 64 cm. (30.3 x 25.2 in.)	Herbert Art Gallery and Museum, Coventry, West Midlands	Scene: Sapphire motor car (tan and blue) produced by Armstrong Siddeley Motors Limited.
1958-1959	Untitled (illustration for Army Magazine, No. 3, 1959)			The National Archives, Kew, Richmond, UK	Scene: repulse of German paratroops in Crete. INF 6/868
1962	Service to Industry: I C I Works, Billingham			The National Archives, Kew, Richmond, UK	Scene: rolling stock at Imperial Chemical Industries rail yard, Billingham, County Durham. AN 14/191
1968	Tsavo Reserve, Kenya (1968–1970), charcoal and pen	view	22.5 × 27.9 cm. (8.9 × 11 in.)		Scene: lions; Tsavo Reserve, Kenya.
1973	The Village, Ethiopia, pencil		26 × 28 cm. (9.1 × 11 in.)		Scene: Ethiopia.
	Cover illustration for John Bull, oil on board	view	53.4 x 45.1 cm. (21 x 17.8 in.)		John Bull.
	There Was No Need for Further Orders	see Cuneo Society website			
	Radio Contact, gouache and charcoal	view see Cuneo Society website	51 × 38 cm. (20.1 × 151 in.)		
	The Queen in the Gardens of Buckingham Palace, pencil	view	26 × 38.1 cm. (10.2 × 15 in.)		
	16th Century Barn, Surrey	see Cuneo Society website			
	Shipmates	see Cuneo Society website			
	Jeremy Sayers	see Cuneo Society website			
	Illustration for Noel Howard, Midshipman, oil on card	view			
	Cover illustrations for War Weekly, oil on canvasboard	view	36.2 × 38.2 cm. (14.3 × 15 in.)		
	At the Steel Works, pencil	view	19.7 × 24.8 cm. (7.8 × 9.8 in.)		
	A Train Assembly Line, pencil and charcoal	view	58.4 × 45.7 cm. (23 × 18 in.)		
	Engineers Working on a Royal Naval Harrier, pencil and charcoal	view	45.7 x 58.4 cm. (18 x 23 in.)		This particular scene is one of 10 works perhaps all with the same title, and actually depicts 'Engineers working on a hovercraft". Aircraft are shown in background, left Harrier, right Phantom.
	New Dry Dock - Palmers, pencil and charcoal	view	52.1 × 40.6 cm. (20.5 × 16 in.)		
	The Travelling Gypsy, pencil	view	20.4 × 28 cm. (8 × 11 in.)		
	The Duke Box, pencil	view	31 × 39.4 cm. (12.2 × 15.5 in.)		
	World War II: The Juke Box, Dunker's Den, pencil	view	31 × 39.4 cm. (12.2 × 15.5 in.)		
	Rescue in the Snow, oil on paper	view	45.8 × 35.5 cm. (18 × 14 in.)		
	Sketches of an Angry Elephant, charcoal and pencil	view	16.5 × 52.1 cm. (6.5 × 20.5 in.)		Scene: African elephant.
	The Door that Never Closes, the Rainbow Club, pencil	view	30.5 × 39.5 cm. (12 × 15.6 in.)		
	A Village Set in a Rolling Pastoral Landscape, gouache		33.1 × 52 cm. (13 × 20.5 in.)		
