= Air cannon =

Air cannon may refer to:

- Air blaster, a de-clogging device with a pressure vessel and triggering mechanism
- Air cannon (mechanics), a device used for marine reflection and refraction surveys
- Air vortex cannon, a toy gun that fires air vortex rings
- Duct
- Vortex ring gun, a non-lethal weapon that fires gas vortex rings
- Air Cannon (Mario), a fictional cannon in the video game Mario Pinball Land

== See also ==
- Air gun (disambiguation)
- Pneumatic cannon (disambiguation)
