= Pneumatic cannon =

Pneumatic cannon may refer to:

- Dynamite gun, any of a class of artillery pieces that use compressed air to propel an explosive projectile
- FN 303, a semi-automatic less-lethal riot gun
- Holman Projector, a naval anti-aircraft weapon
- M61 Vulcan, a hydraulically, electrically, or pneumatically driven, six-barrel, air-cooled, electrically fired Gatling-style rotary cannon
- M134 Minigun, a six-barrel rotary machine gun with a high rate of fire
- Potato cannon, a pipe-based cannon that uses air pressure, or combustion of a flammable gas to fire projectiles, usually potatoes

== See also ==
- Air cannon (disambiguation)
- Air gun (disambiguation)
- Pneumatic weapon, a weapon that fires a projectile by means of air pressure
