= Pneumatic weapon =

Projectile weapon using pressurized air

A pneumatic weapon is a weapon that fires a projectile by means of air pressure, similar in principle to the operation of pneumatic tube delivery systems. The term comes from a Greek word for "wind" or "breath" (πνεῦμα).

== Comparison with firearms ==
In theory, pneumatic weapons have certain advantages over traditional firearms:

- The ammunition needs no propellant or casing; the entire round becomes the projectile. This makes it smaller, lighter, easier and cheaper manufactured, and safer. For the same payload, more projectile can be fired.
- Since no propellant is fired, there is no chemical residue to accumulate in the barrel or chamber, no fumes or odor either.
- Because there is no casing to eject, the firing mechanism can be simpler (resulting in a more reliable and cheaper weapon), and it is theoretically possible to have a higher rate of repeat fire.
- The gas is cool to begin with, and furthermore undergoes adiabatic cooling as it pushes the projectile, instead of being a high temperature mixture. The barrel is not heated to nearly the same extent as with a firearm, and doesn't have to withstand such a high temperature.
- Pressure can be controlled and adjusted, instead of being a fixed parameter of the ammunition.

On the other hand,

- The action, or the mechanism by which subsequent rounds are automatically reloaded, must also be powered by the air pressure; that is not a major drawback as pneumatic tools such as the nail gun proves as long as you carry an air tank and compressor around with you.
- The weapon has to supply or be supplied with a source of very high pressure gas. What is won in complexity and weight around the ammunition, is lost on the other hand in reservoir and compressor, which are not that easily provided. In most case the trade-off on this item proves to favor the firearm.

In practice, steam cannons and airguns were developed throughout 17th to 19th century, and the latter even in service with the Austrian army from 1780 to around 1815, but firearms kept the upper hand.

== Pneumatic weapons in the toy industry ==
The low projectile speed requirement of a toy weapon greatly reduces the amount of air pressure needed; combined with the importance of safety in the toy industry, this has led to widespread adoption of pneumatic firing mechanisms in toy weapons, where a propellant reaction is not appropriate (although other technologies, such as rubber bands, can be used).

The toy industry has produced a number of pneumatic toy weapons, which fire small, lightweight (often plastic and frequently hollow) projectiles at relatively low speeds. Airsoft and paintball guns are a popular toy that operates this way; when used with adequate safety equipment (eye protection at a minimum) these may be used in games involving shooting at other players.

BB guns and other low powered air guns are often marketed towards the youth market. However, in many countries they are subject to normal firearms laws, or else a minimum age is imposed for possession and/or purchase. Such items can inflict lethal injuries if misused. In some countries minors may only use even low-powered airguns under the direct supervision of an adult. Gun safety rules should be followed when using air guns and BB guns.

== See also ==
- Airgun
- Pneumatic cannon
- FN 303
- Holman Projector
- Steam cannon
- Dynamite gun
