= CompAir =

UK engineering and manufacturing company

CompAir Group
- Company type: Engineering and Manufacturing
- Industry: Compressed air & Gas
- Founded: 1801 (as Holman Limited)
- Headquarters: Redditch, Worcestershire, England
- Products: Air and Gas compressors
- Operating income: £ 6.7 million
- Net income: £ 231 million
- Number of employees: 1,750 (2009)
- Parent: Gardner Denver
- Website: www.compair.com

CompAir is an engineering and manufacturing company specialising in compressed air and gas systems. It is a division of NYSE-listed Ingersoll Rand.

== History ==
CompAir was formed when Holman merged with BroomWade to produce "an organisation with the resources to compete effectively in world markets.... the name of the group was the International Compressed Air Corporation. Four years later the name was changed to CompAir."

=== Timeline ===
- Holman Bros Ltd formed in 1801 in Camborne, Cornwall
- BroomWade in 1898 in High Wycombe, Buckinghamshire, UK
- In 1968 the two companies merged to form CompAir
- In 1985 Compair was acquired by Siebe Gorman
- In 1999 Siebe PLC and BTR plc merge to become Invensys
- In 2002 acquired from Invensys by Alchemy Partners (Guernsey) Ltd. for £1.

from Invensys. Alchemy invested £41.4 million to fund a complete restructuring of the loss-making CompAir business, in return for a 67% shareholding.

- October 2008 Alchemy sold Compair to Gardner Denver for a total of £200.6 million

== See also ==
- Camborne
- Holman Projector
