= Air gun (disambiguation) =

An air gun is a gun that fires projectiles by means of compressed air or other gases.

Air gun may also refer to:

- Air gun (seismic), an energy source used in reflection seismology
- Air vortex cannon, a toy gun that fires air vortex rings
- Airsoft gun, a replica gun used in airsoft sports
- BB gun, an air gun designed to shoot metallic spherical projectiles
- Heat gun, a device used to emit a stream of hot air
- Impact wrench, a socket wrench power tool
- Vortex ring gun, a non-lethal weapon that fires gas vortex rings

== See also ==
- Air cannon (disambiguation)
- Pneumatic cannon (disambiguation)
