= Holman Brothers =

English mining equipment manufacturer

Holman Brothers Ltd.
- Industry: Engineering and Manufacturing
- Founded: 1801
- Founder: John Holman
- Defunct: 1968
- Fate: merged with Broom and Wade
- Successor: CompAir
- Headquarters: Camborne, Cornwall, England
- Products: rock drills & air compressors
- Number of employees: 2,000
- Subsidiaries: Climax Mining Equipment

Holman Brothers Ltd. was an English mining equipment manufacturer founded in 1801 based in Camborne.

Holman was Camborne's, and indeed Cornwall's largest manufacturer of industrial equipment. Holman played a part in World War II making the Polish designed 20mm Polsten gun, similar to the Oerlikon but simpler to build and use. It also produced the Holman Projector for the Royal Navy.

At its height Holmans was spread over three sites within Camborne, employing some three and half thousand people.

Cornish mining is renowned worldwide. Alongside the mining industry there evolved an industry manufacturing specialised mining equipment. Holman's founder, Nicholas Holman started a boiler works in 1801.

The company expanded to develop subsidiary companies in centres of mining all over the world and at one stage approximately 80% of products were exported.

== Rock drills ==
In 1881, brothers John Henry and James Miners Holman, had taken over running the business from their father John. They were offered the designs of a new rock drill by a James McCulloch. the brothers filed a joint patent with McCulloch, and began to manufacture the new drill. It became known as the "Cornish Rock Drill", and achieved great commercial success.

In 1882, the rock drill was at work at Dolcoath, Tincroft, East Pool, South Crofty, at Falmouth Docks and in mines in South Wales. The demand grew rapidly.

In 1896, more than 1,000 Cornish rock drills were in use on The South African Rand alone. By the turn of the 20th century the number had doubled. Most of these drills came from Holman in Camborne.

In 1910, the company took first and third prizes in a World Rock Drilling Contest, sponsored by the South African Chamber of Commerce.

Later, the Holman Silver 303 Airleg was used all over the world for mine development.

As well as the rock drills, the company also produced drill rigs and developed 'down the hole' drill primarily for quarrying. The company developed a hydraulic breaker, known as the Holbuster, but was ahead of its time and it was not a commercial success. Later developed by others, it is now a common sight.

The first successful drills were the piston type, or "reciprocators." The drill steel piston and chuck moved together and reciprocated. In Leyner's hammer drill the steel was held loosely in a chuck attached to the cylinder itself, while the piston inside the cylinder reciprocated, striking blows on the blunt end of the drill steel. The hammer drill was lighter, speedier, and used less air than the reciprocating drill.

Leyners earlier drills used a blast of air blown through a hollowed or channelled drill steel to keep the drill holes clear of rock chippings: these drills, however, raised too much dust. To overcome this Leyner introduced water along the drill together with the blast of air. This machine soon ousted the previous one, and was taken up by the Holman factory on a large scale.

== Compressors ==
Holman began to manufacture compressors. The first "Cornish" compressors were built to designs adapted from existing steam engines.

In 1894, Holman manufactured the largest compressor plant ever used in Cornwall. Installed at Carn Brea Mine.

In 1945, Holman employed Jim Hodge who had worked with Whittle to develop the first jet engines to design a jet engine driving extra compressor stages to create a very compact high output compressor for portable use. The parts were mostly made in the company's tool room. Like the Rover jet car of the same era, the excessive fuel consumption made the project non-viable. It was largely the investment in this project which forced the company from being a private family owned business into a public limited company with significant outside investors. 1954 or thereabouts Holman Bros took over the Climax Rock Drill and Engineering Works formerly Stephens Iron foundry. 1959-Holman introduced the Rotair, Britain's first single stage oil flooded rotary screw compressor. 1961 Trade names included Holbit rock drill steels, Dustuctor – a dust containment system, Goodyear Pumps which used an Archemedies screw principle with a meshing disc which was capable of pumping strawberry jam without crushing the strawberries, Tractair – a compressor mounted on the PTO of a tractor, Rotair, Maxam – Maxam Power ltd who produced pneumatic control components.

In 1968, a merger took place with Broomwade to form CompAir Holman. The ownership of the group then passed to Imperial Continental Gas which included Calor Gas. The group rather drifted during this period before being sold to the Siebe Group which proceeded to asset strip the group.

By May 2003 "Portable Compressor manufacturer CompAir, which employs 184 people in West Cornwall, announced earlier this month that increasing international competition meant it was intending to close its Camborne operation by September. It has begun a 90-day consultation period with staff. "

The manufacturing operation was transferred to the Simmern works in Germany formerly owned by Mannesman Demag before its purchase by CompAir. The CompAir Group has now (2012) been bought by Gardner Denver along with a number of other British compressor related companies. Compressor manufacture in Germany continues.

== Bibliography ==
- Carter, Clive (2001). Cornish Engineering. Trevithick Society. ISBN 0-904040-53-4.
