= Philip H. Godsell =

Canadian writer and northern explorer

- Born: July 1, 1889; Wolverhampton, England
- Died: October 8, 1961 (aged 72); Calgary, Alberta
- Occupation: Writer
- Spouse: Jean Turner (m. 1921–1961)
- Writing career
- Period: 20th century
- Genres: History, fiction

Philip Henry Godsell (July 1, 1889 – October 8, 1961) was a Canadian writer and northern explorer. He was employed as an inspecting officer with the Hudson's Bay Company. While he worked for the company he travelled throughout much of the Canadian north and chronicled his experiences.

== Biography ==
Godsell was born in Wolverhampton, England. He joined the Hudson's Bay Company (HBC) and arrived at York Factory, Manitoba in 1906. He worked for the HBC until 1929 in locations such as the Keewatin, Lake Superior, Mackenzie River and Western Arctic districts. Much of his time was spent as a post inspector which meant that he travelled widely through northern Canada inspecting and auditing HBC trading outposts. He worked as an auditor in Winnipeg from 1929 to 1936, but became a full time writer and journalist from 1936 to 1941.

During the Second World War, he worked as an auditor for the Federal Government. He later worked as an auditor for Canadian Pacific Air Lines. He joined the Glenbow Foundation in 1956 as a historical researcher. Throughout his life, he produced numerous books, short stories, radio broadcasts and articles that focused on his experiences as a fur trader, Arctic traveler, and pioneer and his encounters with the Inuit, First Nations Peoples, Royal Canadian Mounted Police (RCMP), and other northern pioneers. His published books include Arctic Trader, Red Hunters of the Snows, They Got Their Man. His outdoor, adventure and detective short stories were published in a wide variety of journals and newspapers.

In 1920, Philip Godsell married the author, Jean Turner.

== Works ==
- The Ojibway Indian (1919)
- Arctic Trader: the account of twenty years with the Hudson's bay company (1935)
- The Last of the Buffalo Hunters (1937)
- Red Hunters of the Snow: an account of thirty years' experience with the primitive Indian and Eskimo tribes of the Canadian North-west and Arctic coast (1938)
- They Got Their Man: on patrol with the North West Mounted (1939)
- The Vanishing Frontier: a saga of traders, Mounties and men of the last North West (1939)
- Speaking Birchbark: the invention that enabled Eskimos and Indians to discard primitive picture-making for syllabic alphabet and printed books in tribal language (1940)
- The Romance of the Alaska Highway (1944)
- Pilots of the Purple Twilight: the story of Canada's early bush flyers (1955)
- Skagway Terror (1957)
- "The Terror at St. Laurent" Real Crime Cases ( September, 1944)
- "The Eskimo, The Trader and The Man in Scarlet", Daring Crime Cases (June, July No.5 1943).
