= Duct =

The word duct is derived from the Latin word for led/leading. It may refer to:

- Duct (anatomy), various ducts in anatomy and physiology
  - Tear duct, which carry tears to the eyes
- Duct (HVAC), for transfer of air between spaces in a structure
- Duct tape, a kind of adhesive tape
- Ducted fan, motor for aircraft
- Electrical bus duct, a metal enclosure for busbars
- Duct (industrial exhaust), industrial exhaust duct system designed for low pressure-pneumatic convey of gas, fumes, dusts, shavings, and other pollutants from works space to atmosphere after cleaning and removal of contaminants
- Atmospheric duct, a horizontal layer in the lower atmosphere in which the vertical refractive index gradients are such that radio signals (a) are guided or ducted, (b) tend to follow the curvature of the Earth, and (c) experience less attenuation in the ducts than they would if the ducts were not present
  - Tropospheric ducting, a type of radio propagation in the troposphere that allows signals to travel unusually long distances
  - Earth–ionosphere waveguide, a type of atmospheric duct
- Surface duct, a sound propagation phenomenon at sea
- Duct Publishing, an imprint of the German group VDM Publishing devoted to the reproduction of Wikipedia content
- Dispatchable Unit Control Table (DUCT) in z/Architecture
- Flexible Ducting

== See also ==
- Ducked
