= Holman Projector =

British anti-aircraft weapon

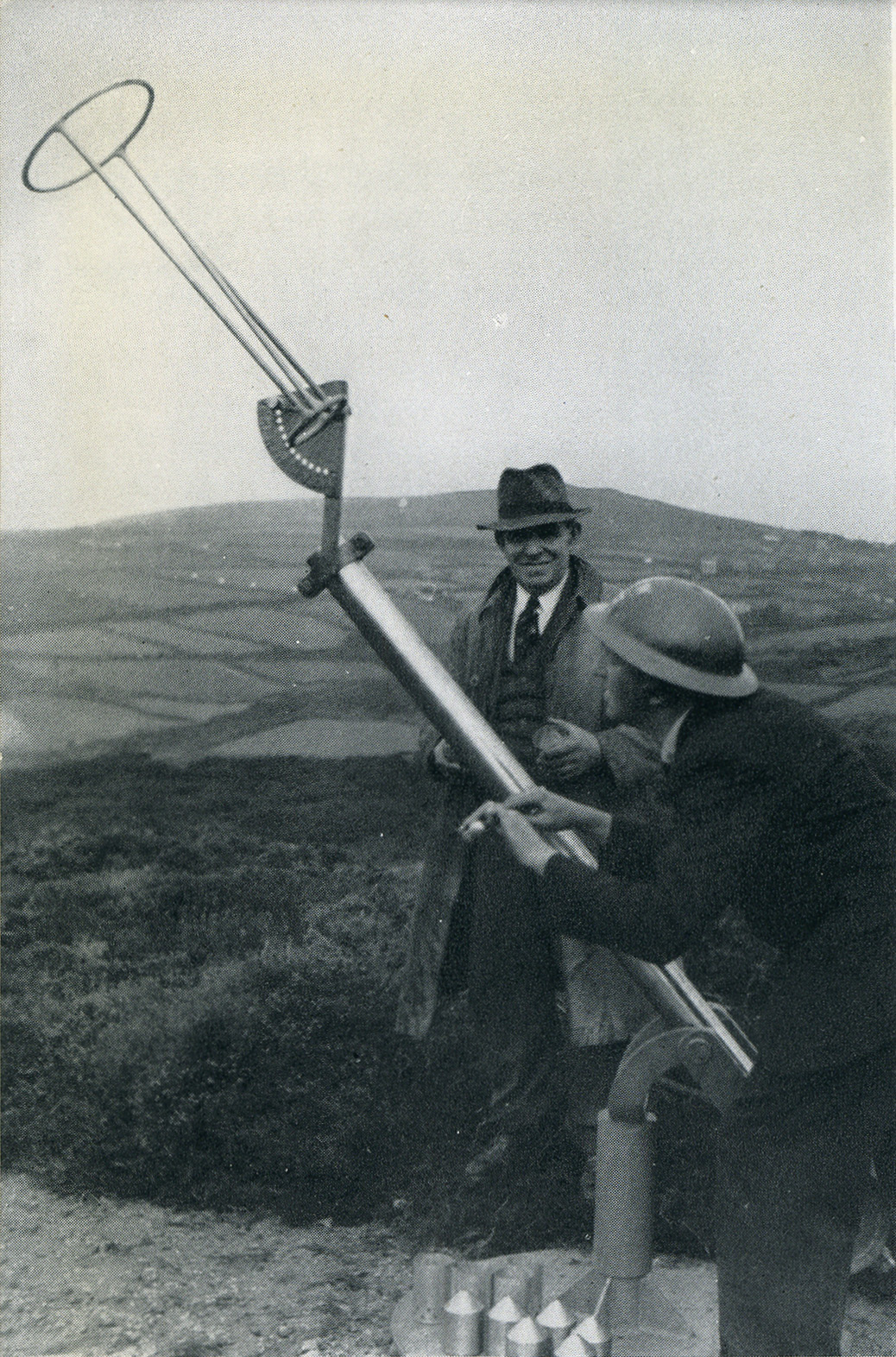
- A Holman Projector prepared for early trials at Porthtowan. A crude anti-aircraft sight is fitted to the mortar barrel. Morris Oram firing.
- Type: Grenade Projector
- Place of origin: United Kingdom

Production history
- Designer: Morris Oram

The Holman Projector was an anti-aircraft weapon used by the Royal Navy during the Second World War, primarily between early 1940 and late 1941. The weapon was proposed and designed by Holmans, a machine tool manufacturer based at Camborne, Cornwall. A number of models were produced during the war years, but all worked on the principle of a pneumatic mortar, using compressed air or high pressure steam to fire an explosive projectile at enemy aircraft.

Intended as a stop-gap weapon for British merchant ships, which had been suffering many losses from Luftwaffe aircraft, the low altitude at which such strikes often took place (such as during torpedo attacks by Heinkel He 111s or skip-bombing attacks by Focke-Wulf Fw 200 Condor) meant that a weapon of such limited range and velocity could throw up an effective screen of fire over a vessel, even if only to create a distracting or deterrent effect, obliging the enemy to bomb from greater heights which reduced bombing accuracy. While ineffective against normal bombing attacks from higher altitudes, the weapon was far cheaper, easier to build and install in great numbers than conventional anti-aircraft artillery.

Holmans specialised in producing gas compressors and pneumatic equipment, its owner, Treve Holman, conceived a way that his firm could aid in the war effort beyond the production of tools. Recalling the First World War-era Stokes Mortar and its successor, the Ordnance ML 3 inch Mortar, Holman believed that it would be possible to produce a version powered by compressed air. Preliminary tests showed that the idea was feasible, with an early prototype throwing an eighteen-pound steel weight nearly 100 yards (91 m).

== Mk I ==
The design eventually settled on for the Mk I had a 4½ foot unrifled steel barrel. Rounds were dropped down the barrel from the muzzle and the pneumatic system triggered instantly upon the round striking the base. The rounds were made from an open-topped metal container, holding a Mills bomb fitted with a 3.5 second fuse. High-pressure air bottles were able to supply enough power to fire fifty rounds each, with a maximum height during trials of around 600 feet (180 m). The rate of fire could reach thirty rounds per minute in the hands of an experienced crew. More appealing yet to the armed forces was that the weapon could be produced using only cast iron and mild steel, both of which were in fairly ready supply.

An official trial of the Mk I Projector took place in February 1940 with resounding success. An order was placed by the Royal Navy for 1,000 of the Mk I models and the weapons proved just as successful in action; the first confirmed success was reported only three weeks after the initial batch was sent out when a Heinkel aircraft was damaged. While direct hits were rare, the bombs fired by the projector displayed an unexpected property — the explosion would leave a large puff of black smoke, absent from ground-based explosions of similar grenades. Firing a large number in quick succession gave the impression to incoming Luftwaffe pilots that the target vessel was armed with something far more deadly than the Holman Projector, deterring or disrupting attacks, or convincing the aircraft's crew that an attack at greater range would be prudent, with a commensurate decrease in accuracy.

== Mk II ==
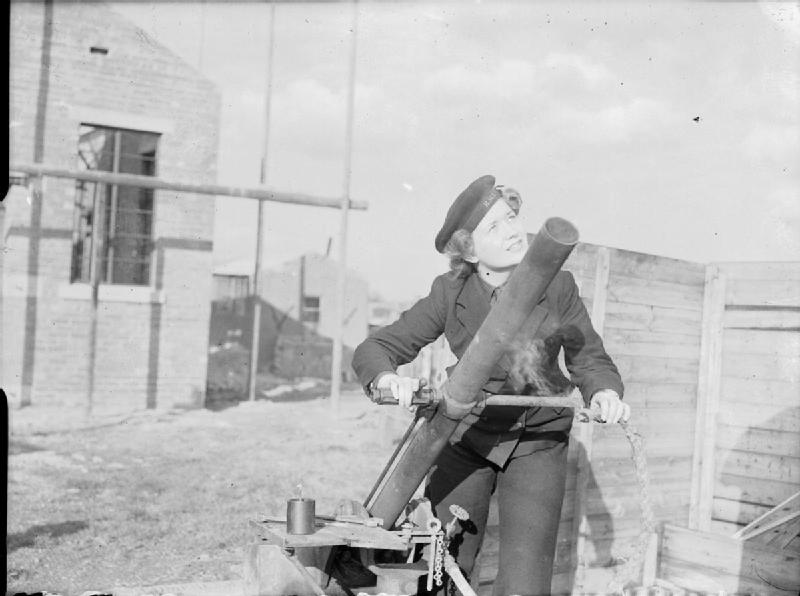
Wren N S Hopkins, from London, operating a Holman projector, on the Defensively Equipped Merchant Ship ranges at Cardiff.

The Mk II Projector was developed after a request from the Royal Navy for a version that could be fired using steam in place of compressed air, since the steam-engined trawlers (fishing and minesweeping) had the former in plentiful supply. The Stokes design of the Mk I needed to be abandoned for this, since the harsh weather experienced by the trawlers invariably rusted the valves of the pneumatics. When steam was used in such a system, the water would condense in the pipes and prevent firing of the weapon. To solve this, a firing trigger was added, in place of the Stokes design in which the round would be fired automatically.

The new version was fitted to a wide variety of ships, from destroyers to minesweepers and motor gun boats: to demonstrate the weapon's versatility, a trial was arranged in Aldershot before the Prime Minister Winston Churchill.

No Mills rounds were brought, as it was assumed that some form of ammunition would be provided by the British Army, who were overseeing the trials but these were overlooked and the trial was set to be delayed until one officer thought to bring out the bottles of beer that were to have been served at lunch: the smooth bore of the Projector allowed even these irregular projectiles to be fired, with all striking the target with an explosion of glass and foam. The Prime Minister commented on the weapon afterwards, describing it as "A very good idea, this weapon of yours. It will save our cordite".

(This was prophetic: while possibly apocryphal, stories of projectors mounted on trawlers being used to fire 'spuds' (potatoes) at low-flying German aircraft for the want of Mills bombs led to the nickname 'potato thrower'. 'spud gun' etc.) Regardless of the successful trial results, the Mk II proved to be highly inaccurate when fired at distant moving targets: only a dozen or so aircraft were confirmed to have been downed by the weapon in its first year of service. It did succeed in convincing many more aircrews that the target vessel was better equipped with more effective weapons, a fact confirmed by the large number of reports were made about Luftwaffe aircraft turning away from an attack after salvos from ship-mounted Holman Projectors. Within the Admiralty, the perception was that the Projector was a useful stop-gap weapon in the early years of the war, when other more effective anti aircraft weaponry, such as the Oerlikon 20 mm cannon, were in short supply.

== Mk III ==
In 1941, production of the Mk III Holman Projector began. This version was semi-automatic, and capable of firing projectiles in a salvo to a height of around 1,000 feet (300 m). The Admiralty placed an order for a further one thousand units, to be fitted to coastal gunboats and other light craft, where the light recoil of the weapon had proven useful. Morris Oram, from Camborne, led the development and was later presented by Winston Churchill with a commemorative picture after successful trials of the Mk III at Portsmouth. He worked for over 50 years at Holman Brothers.

Plans were drawn up for a Mk IV to fill this niche more readily, with a shorter barrel and swivel base but when these were ready the war had progressed, more advanced weaponry was available that made the Projector obsolete. A number of the earlier model Projectors remained in service and discouraged attacks in the Mediterranean by some smaller submarines, and a few were adapted to fire grapnels for commando cliff assaults. Around 4,500 Holman Projectors were put into service during the war and several can still be found in museums in the United Kingdom.

== Effectiveness ==
While Holman Projector had limited success with one cargo ship's crew shooting down two aircraft, it became better known for its other uses. Since it had a wide barrel, the projector could shoot nearly anything that could fit inside it; the most popular makeshift ammunition was potatoes.

== Ammunition ==
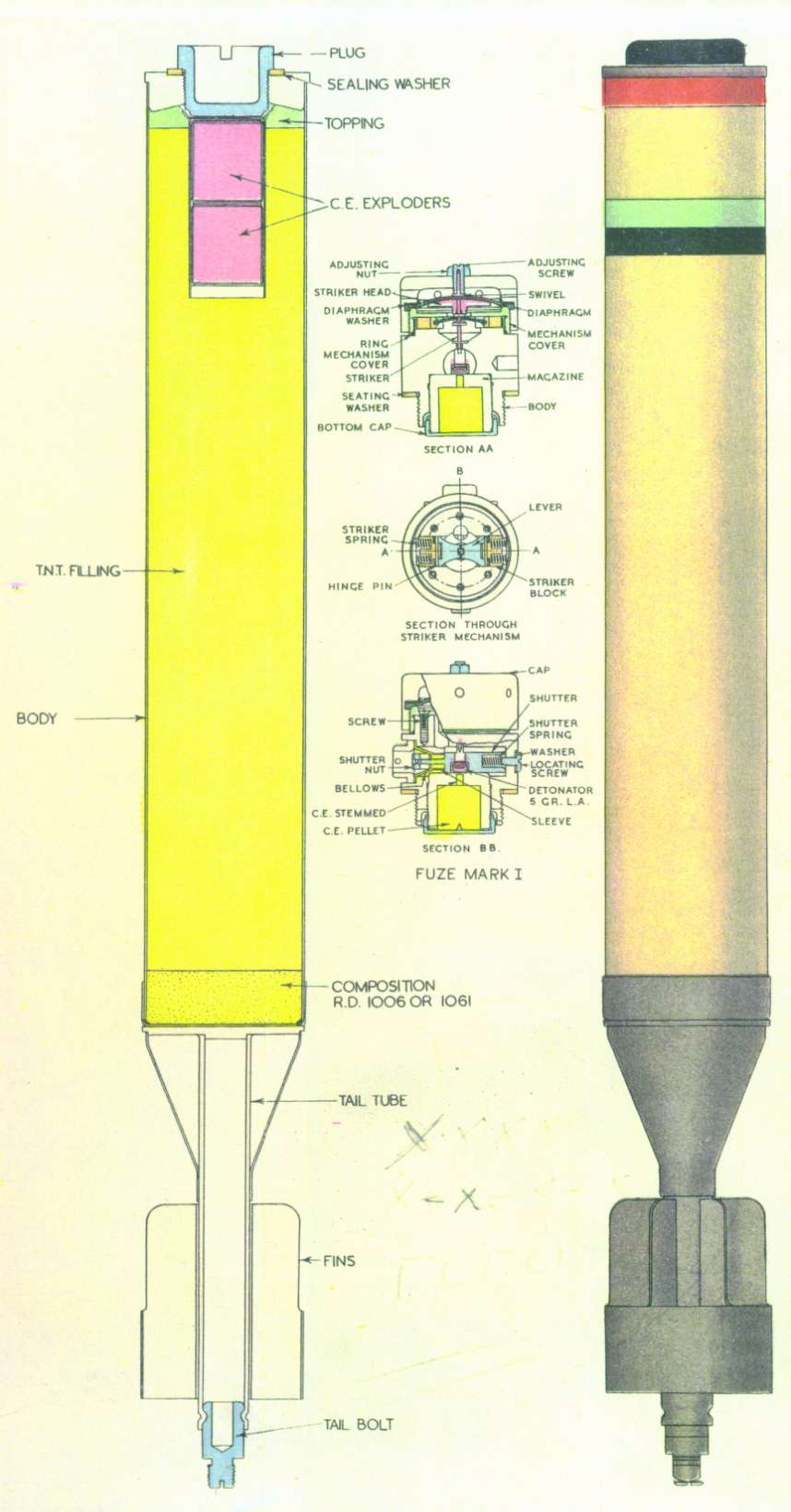
H.E. round

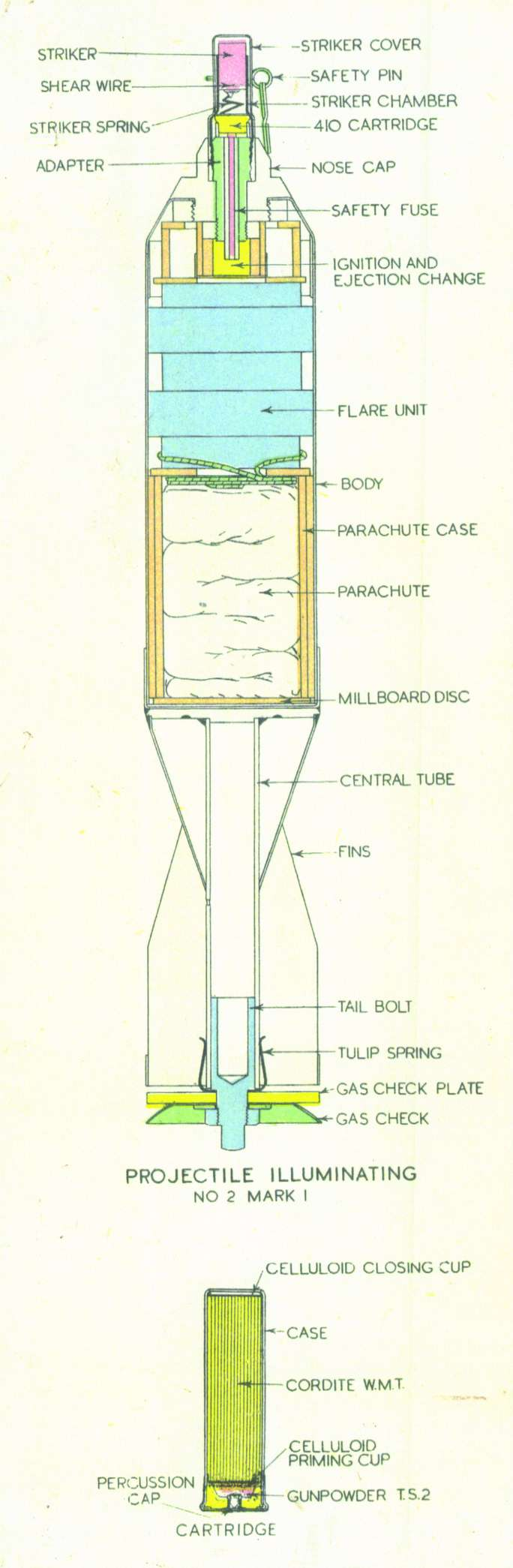
Illuminating round

== See also ==
- Northover Projector, another World War II grenade throwing device
- AA Mine Discharger, a Japanese anti-aircraft mortar.
- Unrotated Projectile, another Royal Navy anti-aircraft weapon.
- Steam cannon, other steam-powered missile launchers
