= Steam cannon =

Projectile launcher powered by heat and water

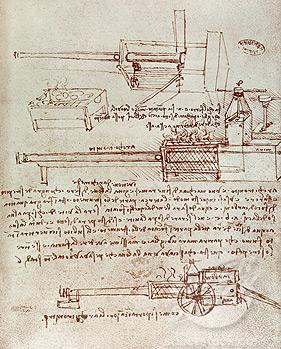
Leonardo Da Vinci's drawing of his steam cannon. 15th century

A steam cannon is a cannon that launches a projectile using only heat and water, or using a ready supply of high-pressure steam from a boiler. It has been claimed that the first steam cannon was designed by Archimedes during the Siege of Syracuse. Leonardo da Vinci was also known to have designed one (see the Architonnerre).

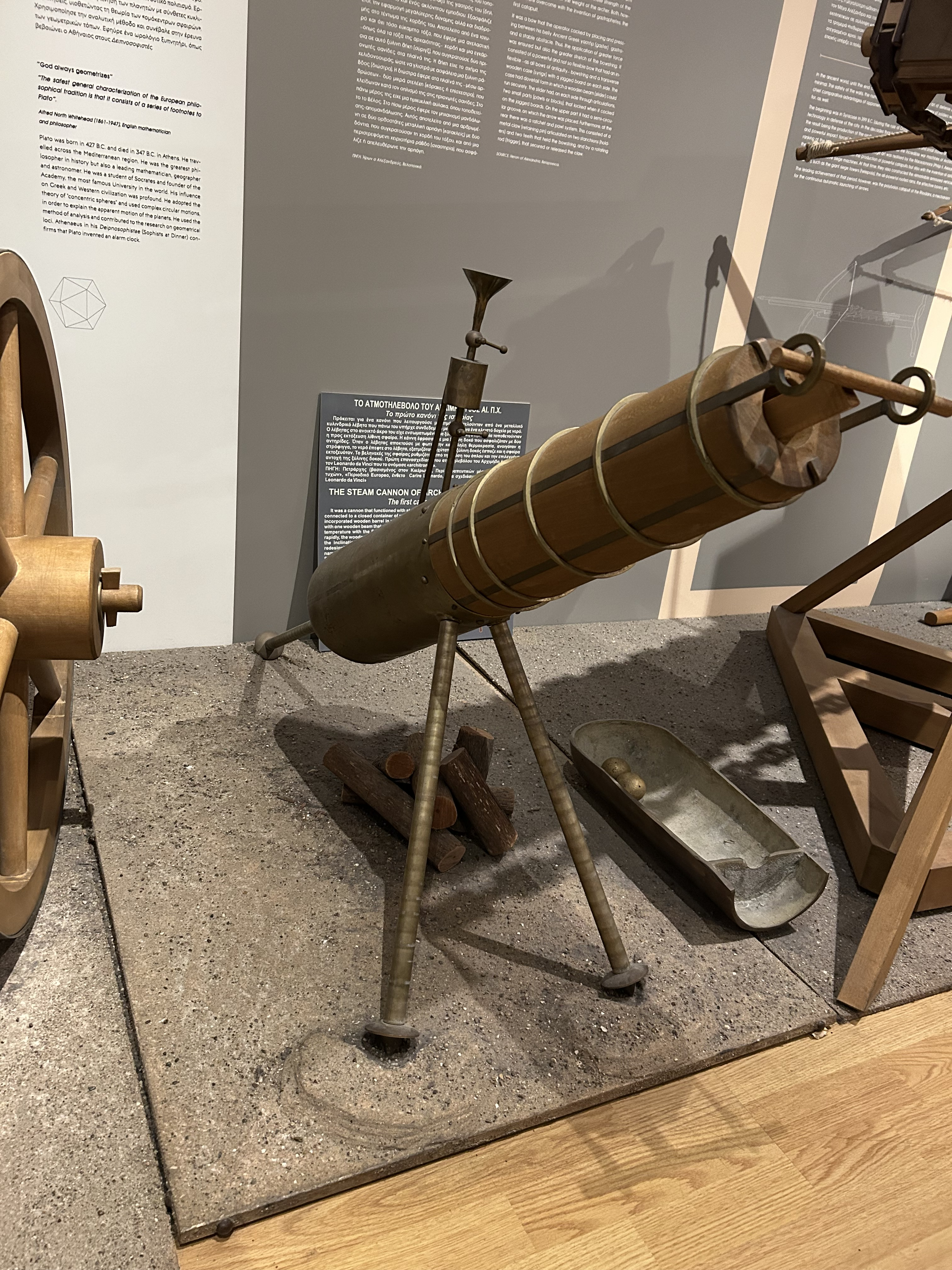
A reconstruction of Archimedes' steam cannon, in Kotsanas Museum of Ancient Greek Technology, Athens, Greece.

The early device would consist of a large metal tube, preferably copper due to its high thermal conductivity, which would be placed in a furnace. One end of the tube would be capped and the other loaded with a projectile. Once the tube reached a high enough temperature, a small amount of water would be injected in behind the projectile. In theory, da Vinci believed the water would rapidly expand into vapour, blasting the projectile out of the front of the barrel.

== Age of steam ==
Various unsuccessful efforts were made during the age of steam to create working steam machine guns and cannons using methods and technology derived from steam locomotives.

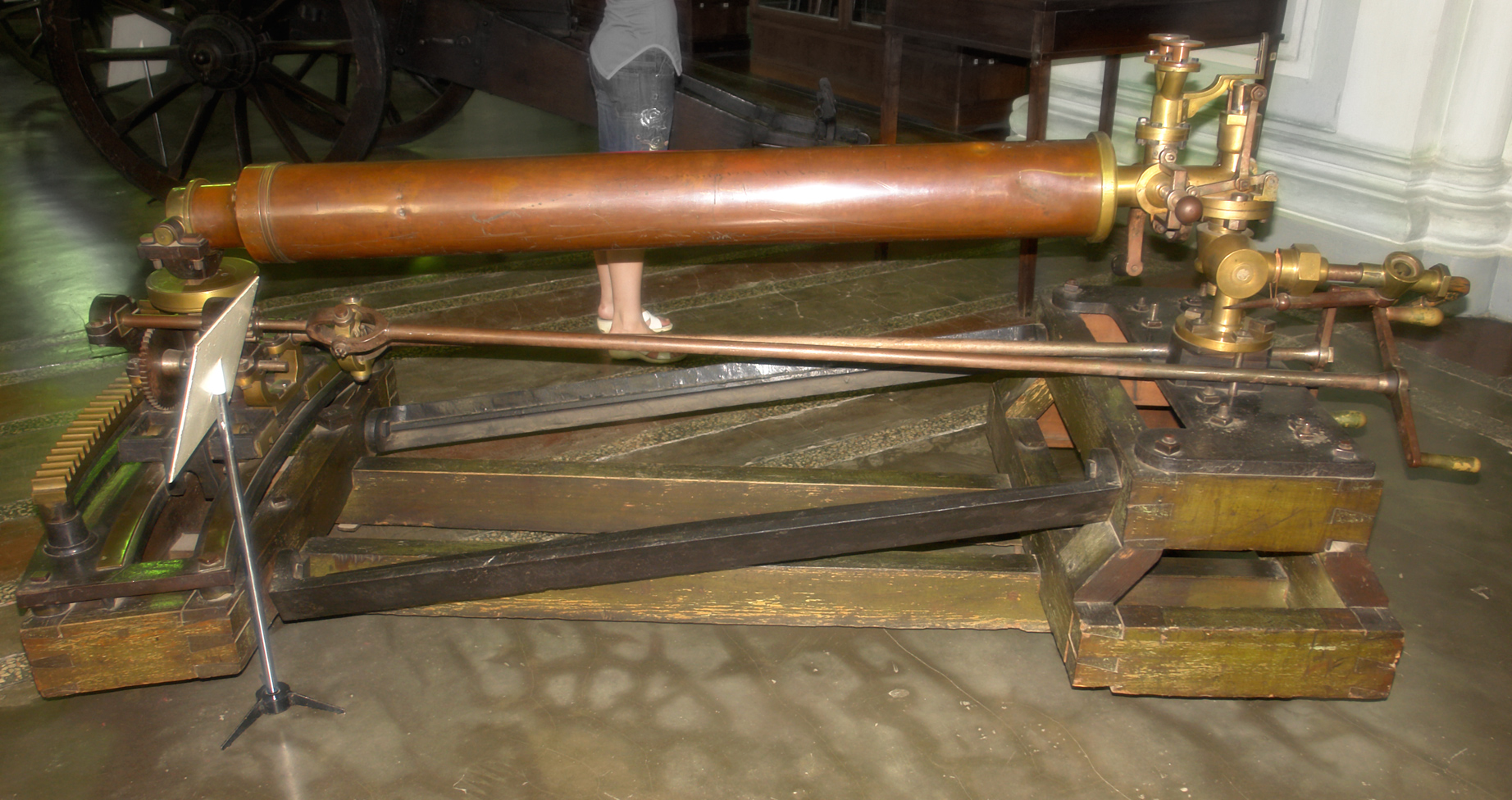
Experimental prototype of 17.5 mm steam cannon. Russian Empire, 1826–29.

In 1826–29, a 17.5 mm bore experimental steam cannon was developed by Colonel Karelin of the Imperial Russian Corps of Communications. The barrel was of green copper in a red copper casing; it was capable of firing cannonballs at a rate of 50 rounds per minute. Tests in 1829 failed and the gun was transferred to the arsenal of St. Petersburg. It is now in the Military Historical Museum of Artillery, Engineers and Signal Corps in St. Petersburg.

The Winans Steam Gun of 1858–1861 was a steam-powered centrifugal gun used during the American Civil War by the Confederates. It used steam power and centrifugal forces to propel projectiles. It was not used successfully in battle.

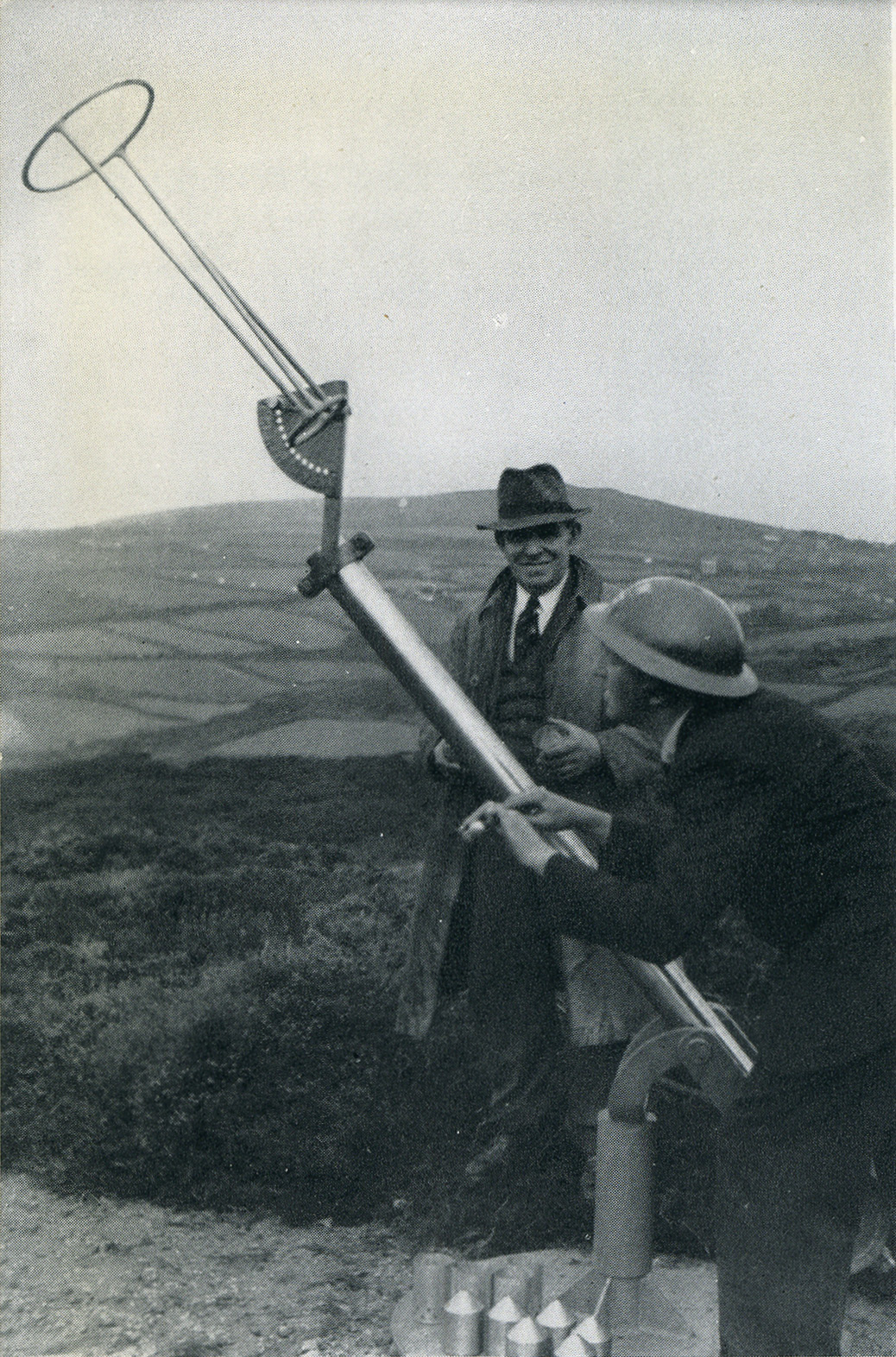
Prototype Holman Projector, an anti-aircraft grenade projector, in action in 1940

A successful World War II steam cannon was the Holman Projector, which was used to launch explosive Mills bombs into the air to create a defensive barrage against low-flying enemy aircraft. These later steam cannons were fired by rapidly introducing a burst of highly pressurized steam into the chamber behind the projectile, accelerating the projectile up the barrel to a high speed, much like an air gun, only more powerful. The fundamental function of the device was basically the same as a steam engine, only with a projectile taking place of a piston. The Holman Projector was produced by Holman Brothers of Cornwall, who specialised in pneumatic equipment for mining. The first Projectors were powered by compressed air, stored in high pressure cylinders. After a successful defence of the SS Highlander in August 1940, downing two Heinkel floatplanes, there was a demand for more projectors to be fitted to small naval trawlers. Since these vessels were steam-powered but had no compressed air system, the Admiralty requested Holmans to develop a steam-powered version of the Projector. There were concerns by Treve Holman over the effects of heat on the Mills bomb projectile. A test was arranged, where a borrowed council steam roller was used to 'cook' the Projector and projectile, at 190 °C for 20 minutes before the projectile was safely fired to 1,000 feet altitude.

== See also ==
- Architonnerre – Leonardo da Vinci's 15th century steam cannon, which he attributed to Archimedes
- William Murdoch – invented a steam cannon
- Hilton Head Island, South Carolina – site where an experimental steam cannon was built at the turn of the 20th century
- Winans Steam Gun – steam-powered centrifugal gun built during the American Civil War
- "Steam Cannon" (MythBusters episode) – MythBusters steam cannon episode
- Jacob Perkins - invented the steam gun, an early fully automatic machine gun
- Phreatic eruption – Volcanic steam eruption

== Sources ==
- "Cannons"
