= David Rivault de Fleurance =

French mathematician

David Rivault de Fleurance (1571–1616) was a French mathematician and royal servant. He was born probably at La Cropte, near Laval, Mayenne, France.

He is the son of Pierre Rivault and Madeleine Gaultier who contracted marriage in 1550

He was a "Gentleman of the Bedchamber" to Henry IV, and a teacher of Louis XIII. He discovered that water, if confined in a bombshell and heated, would explode the shell. He published that fact in his treatise on artillery in 1605, where he wrote: "The water is converted into air, and its vaporization is followed by violent explosion." His discovery is seen as one of the steps leading to the invention of the steam engine. He died in Tours, France in January 1616.

== Works ==
- L'effet de la raréfaction de l'eau ad e quoi épouvanter les plut assurés des hommen Elément d'artilierie, p. 117-118. Paris, 1605

== See also ==
- History of the steam engine
