= Winans Steam Gun =

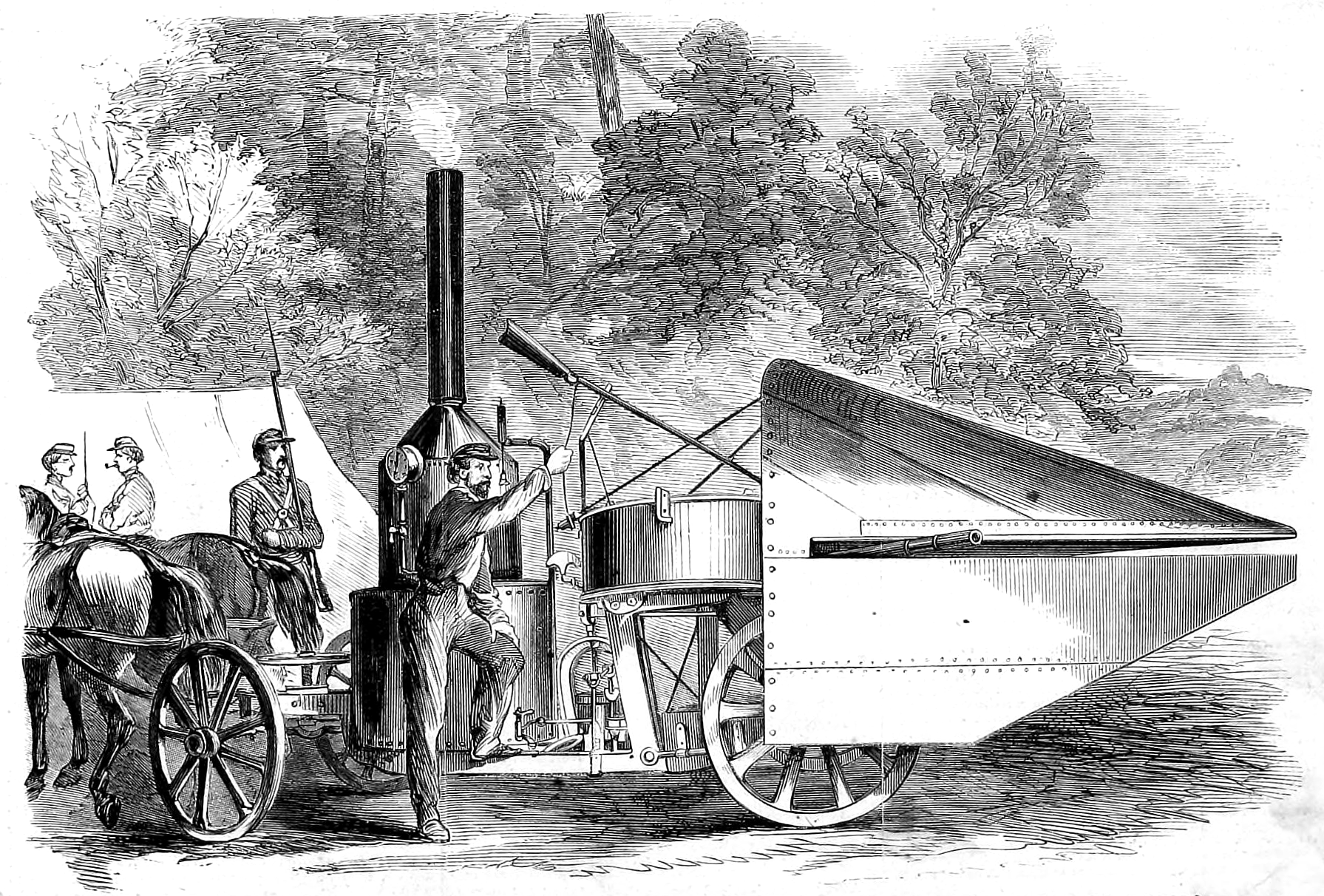
- Winans Steam Gun after confiscation, from May 18, 1861 issue of Frank Leslie's Illustrated Newspaper
- Type: Centrifugal Steam Gun
- Place of origin: United States of America

Service history
- Used by: United States
- Wars: American Civil War

Production history
- Designer: Charles S. Dickinson
- Designed: 1858
- Manufacturer: Unknown
- Produced: 1860
- No. built: 1

The Winans Steam Gun was a steam-powered centrifugal gun used during the American Civil War, which used centrifugal forces (rather than gunpowder) to propel projectiles.

== Description ==
Similar in size to a steam-powered fire engine of the day, the gun had a menacing appearance thanks to a large curved shield covering its inner workings.

Its mechanism involved a shielded barrel that rotated up to 250 times per minute. Shot dumped into the top of the barrel rolled down into it and were held back by a spring-loaded gate that opened to allow one shot to be flung out per revolution of the barrel. Despite the effort invested in the project, it was unable to match the accuracy or power of the gunpowder weaponry of the time, and thus the steam gun project was abandoned.

== History ==
The weapon grew out of work by Cleveland, Ohio, inventors William Joslin and Charles S. Dickinson on a hand-powered centrifugal gun, which they patented in 1858 – one of many 19th century attempts to harness "centrifugal" force – whether produced by hand or steam power. After the two had a falling out, Dickinson promoted the device under his name, patented his own version a few months later, and found funding to build a steam-powered gun in Boston in 1860. He brought the device to Baltimore and demonstrated it for the City Council in February 1861. The machine was supposedly capable of shooting 200 projectiles in a minute.

In the wake of the April 19, 1861 clash between a pro-Southern mob and the 6th Massachusetts Militia in Baltimore, Maryland, word spread of an allegedly powerful steam gun said to have been invented and built by noted Maryland industrialist and states' rights advocate Ross Winans to oppose Federal troops passing through Baltimore to Washington in response to President Lincoln's call for volunteers.

The gun was taken from Dickinson or his associates by City Police to be put in readiness for use if needed. Available evidence suggests that it was taken to the foundry/machine shop of Ross Winans and his son Thomas whom the city's Board of Police had hired to make pikes, shot and other munitions. Shortly after, the gun was taken from the Winans's facility and publicly displayed with other weapons being gathered by city authorities.

In the excitement of the times, Ross Winans's public involvement in states' rights politics in Maryland, his great fortune, word of the munitions work being done at his factory for the city, city defense appropriations, and the appearance of a menacing looking gun that had emerged from his factory became mixed in the press and were carried in papers across the country.

After calm returned, the gun was taken again to Winans's shop for repair at city expense, then returned to Dickinson, who then attempted to take it to Harper's Ferry to sell to Confederate forces. Union forces captured the gun and its handlers, intact, in mid journey on May 11, 1861, at Ellicott Mills, Maryland and took it to their camp at Relay, Maryland.

While not a party to the attempt to escape with the gun, press accounts linking him to it, his pro-states' rights politics, rumors of munitions making for the South, and the real munitions work he had undertaken for Baltimore authorities led to Ross Winans's arrest and brief detention by Federal forces. He was released after 48 hours, after agreeing that he would not take up arms against the government.

Following its capture, the gun was tested by members of the 6th Massachusetts Infantry, before being sent North, via Annapolis, Fortress Monroe, and eventually to Lowell, Massachusetts, where it was presented to a mechanic's organization. Despite receiving significant political and media attention throughout the spring of 1861, it made no contribution to the war itself. It remained little more than a curiosity, eventually being scrapped long after the war.

== Replica ==
In 1961, a full-scale replica was built by Mark Handwerk, Joseph H. Clark and Joseph Zoller III for the Centennial of the Civil War. The gun is on outdoor display on the median of US. Route 1 in Elkridge, Maryland.

A model was built and tested in Episode 93 – "Confederate Steam Gun" of MythBusters.

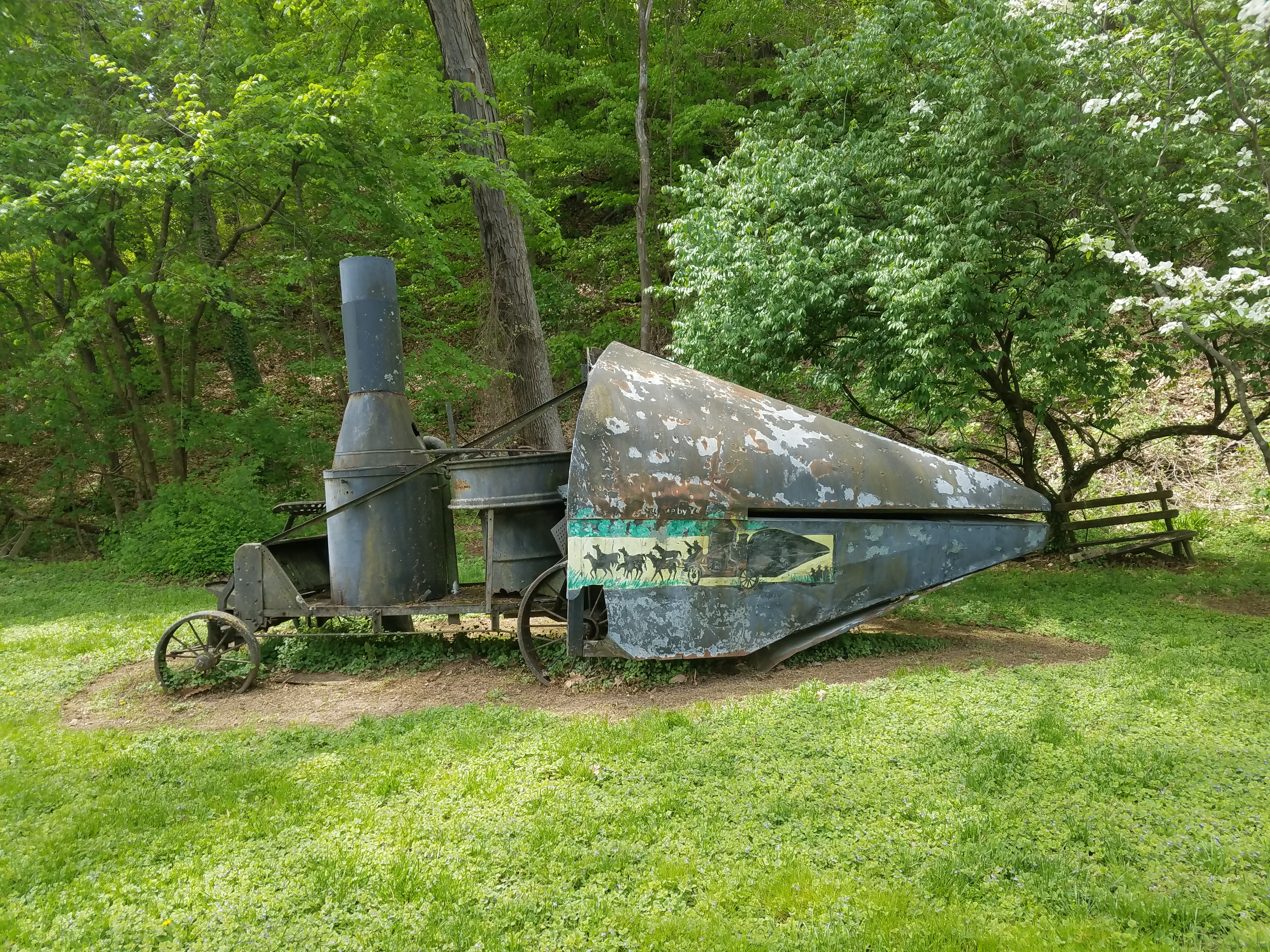
Replica of the Winans Steam Gun in Elkridge, Maryland

== See also ==
- Mass driver
