= Centrifugal gun =

Projectile Accelerator

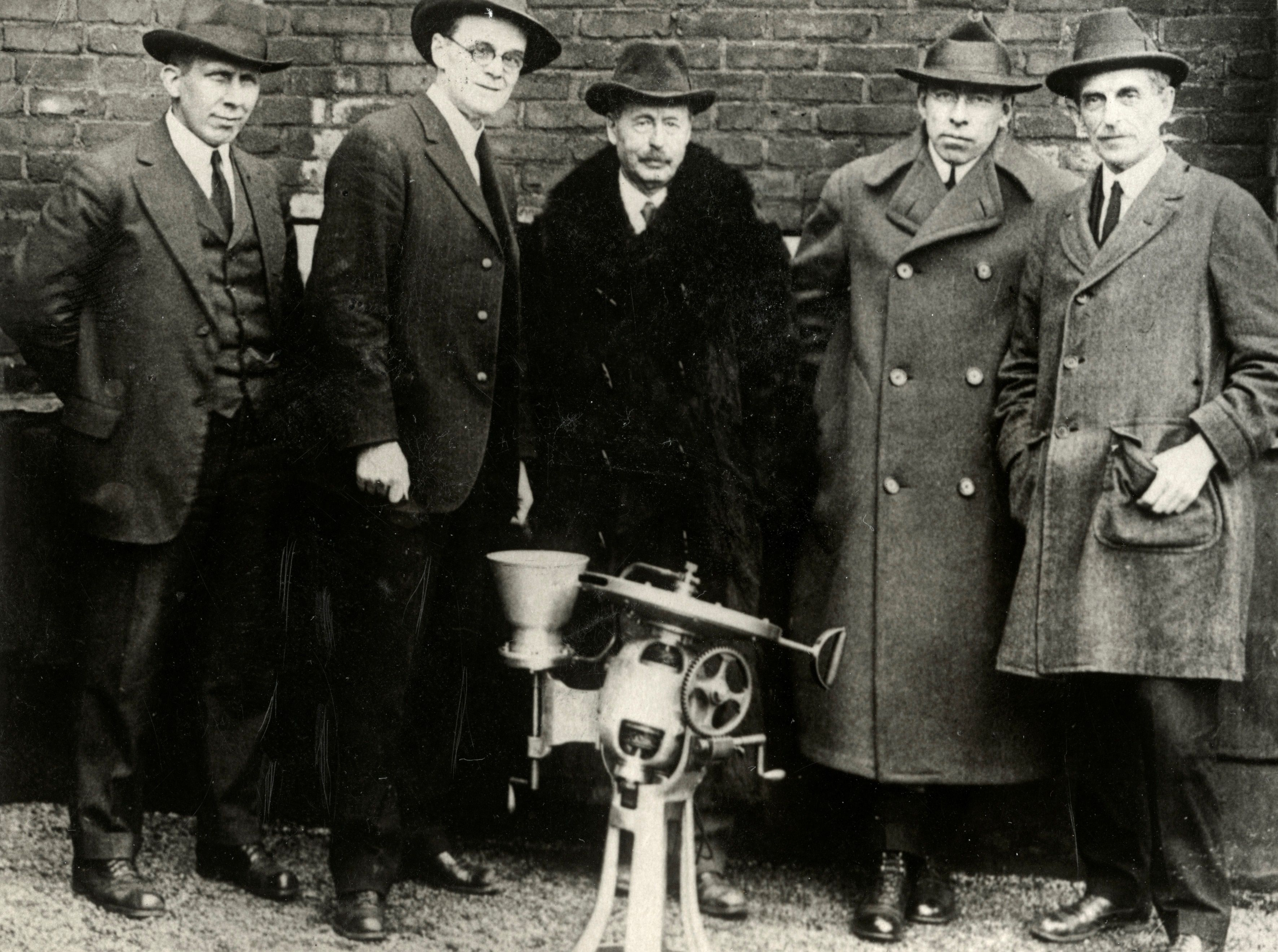
Levi W. Lombard (middle) with the centrifugal gun he invented in 1918

A centrifugal gun is a type of rapid-fire projectile accelerator, like a machine gun but operating on a different principle. Centrifugal guns use a rapidly rotating disc to impart energy to the projectiles, gaining kinetic energy from steam, electricity or other engine source rather than gunpowder. The centrifugal gun was one of a number of different ideas proposed to address the problems of smoke, over-heating, and premature detonation, that were eventually solved by smokeless powder, improved metallurgy, and shock-and-heat stable explosives.

== History ==
A steam-powered centrifugal gun built by Charles Dickinson of Boston was tested during the American Civil War. This gun was popularly but incorrectly attributed to pro-Southern Maryland millionaire and inventor Ross Winans. Another hand-cranked centrifugal gun that fired musket balls was designed by Robert McCarty during the same period. Despite repeated tests, including one in the presence of Abraham Lincoln, McCarty's gun never saw service. John A. Dahlgren however took the idea seriously, and after testing McCarty's prototype, he built a steam-powered 12 pounder which could fire 15 rounds in 16 seconds and had a range of a mile, though with extremely low accuracy. As historian Robert V. Bruce notes: "the sole casualty of centrifugal gunfire during the Civil War seems to have been one ill-starred Army mule".

The idea was tested during World War I by the US Bureau of Standards, using a prototype built by lawyer Edward T. Moore, and advertised as a silent machine gun. The prototype used a powerful electric motor to spin the gun's grooved rotor. It was abandoned due to extremely poor accuracy. Moore was granted USPTO patent number 1332992. Another design can be found in USPTO patent number 1311492, granted in July 1919. Another effort during World War I was to build a centrifugal gun powered by an aircraft engine. This design was advanced by E. L. Rice and taken seriously by Robert Andrews Millikan and the National Research Council; the project ultimately proved "beyond resolution".

In an episode from the 2007 season of MythBusters Adam and Jamie built a replica of the Winans Steam Gun and found it unreliable.

== Similar devices ==
In 2005, a new centrifugal weapon called DREAD, invented by Charles St George, was discussed in New Scientist and in Annals of Improbable Research. DREAD, patented in 2003, claims to launch projectiles with the speed of a handgun, at about 300 m/s.

SpinLaunch, a California company founded in 2014, is working to launch satellites into space with a system similar to a centrifugal gun.

The Trinamic Technologies B.O.S.S. (Battery-Operated SlingShot) uses a "high-RPM electric motor to spin .312-caliber (7.9mm) steel ball bearings at high speed” projecting them at variable speeds of between 5,000 and 10,000RPM. The system is powered by either 24- or 36-volt DC battery packs.

== See also ==
- Catapult
- Chain gun
- Fokker-Leimberger
- Gatling gun
- Gorgas machine gun
- Jai alai
- Pitching machine
- Revolver cannon
