= Architonnerre =

Leonard da Vinci's project

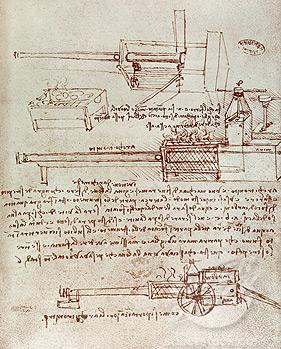
Leonardo da Vinci's pen and ink drawing of the Architonnerre/Architronito

The Architonnerre (Architronito) was a steam-powered cannon, a description of which is found in the papers of Leonardo da Vinci dating to the late 15th century, although he attributes its invention to Archimedes in the 3rd century BC.

Leonardo's description was hidden amongst his papers until it was rediscovered by Étienne-Jean Delécluze of the French Institute in 1838 and published in the magazine L'Artiste in 1841, well after the modern high pressure steam engine had been independently invented.

== Description of operation ==
The following is the most likely means of operation from the description given. A conventional muzzle-loading cannon would have a strong metal tube connecting the vented end, where the fuse would normally be placed, to a copper boiler, terminating below the water level inside but describing an inverted U above it in the manner of a syphon. A fire of charcoal would heat the vented end of the cannon and the boiler so that the metal of the cannon's end would become red hot and the boiler would boil vigorously. Steam would be allowed to escape from the boiler through an opening with a screwed thread so there would be no buildup of pressure. To fire the cannon a cap would be screwed tightly into the boiler opening, triggering an immediate buildup of steam pressure in the boiler. This would force the boiling water along the syphon tube into the cannon's base. Here it would come in contact with the red hot cannon walls and flash into steam, the pressure of the sudden release of steam forcing the cannonball out of the muzzle.

== Leonardo's own description ==
Account from the Nelson Examiner and New Zealand Chronicle, 1842:

The Steam-Engine. – M. Delecluze has lately made a discovery among the manuscripts of Leonardo da Vinci, carrying back a knowledge of the steam-engine to at least as far back as the 15th century. He has published in the Artiste a notice on the life of Leonardo da Vinci, to which he adds a fac-simile of a page from one of his manuscripts, and on which are five sketches with the pen, representing the details of the apparatus of a steam-gun, with an explanatory note upon what he designates under the name of the " Architonnerre," and of which note the following is a translation : – " Invention of Archimedes. – The Architonnerre is a machine of fine copper, which throws balls with a loud report and great force. It is used in the following manner : – One third of this instrument contains a large quantity of charcoal fire. When the water is well heated, a screw at the top of the vessel which contains the water must be made quite tight. On closing the screw above, all the water will escape below, will descend into the heated portion of the instrument, and be immediately converted into a vapour so abundant and powerful, that it is wonderful to see its fury and hear the noise it produces. This machine will carry a ball of a talent in weight." It is worthy of remark that Leonardo da Vinci – far from claiming the merit of this invention for himself or the men of his time – attributes it to Archimedes.

The weight of the cannonball is described as one talent. A Roman talent was 32.3 kilograms (71 lb), although the amount varied across the ancient world by a few kilograms.

== See also ==
- Steam cannon
- List of works by Leonardo da Vinci
- Science and inventions of Leonardo da Vinci
